= 99th Light Anti-Aircraft Regiment, Royal Artillery =

14th Bn Queen's Royal Regiment (West Surrey) 99th Light Anti-Aircraft Regiment, RA
- Royal Artillery cap badge
- Active: 4 July 1940 – 1 October 1944
- Country: United Kingdom
- Branch: British Army
- Role: Infantry; Anti-aircraft artillery
- Size: Regiment
- Part of: 12th AA Brigade
- Engagements: Operation Husky; Operation Avalanche; Italian Campaign

Commanders
- Notable commanders: Lt-Col Alexander Wilkinson, DSO, MC*, GM

The 99th Light Anti-Aircraft Regiment (99th LAA Rgt) was an air defence unit of the British Army during World War II. Initially raised as an infantry battalion of the Queen's Royal Regiment (West Surrey) (The Queen's) in 1940, it transferred to the Royal Artillery at the end of 1941. It participated in the assault landings in Sicily (Operation Husky) and Italy (Operation Avalanche). It then served through the Italian Campaign until it was disbanded in 1944.

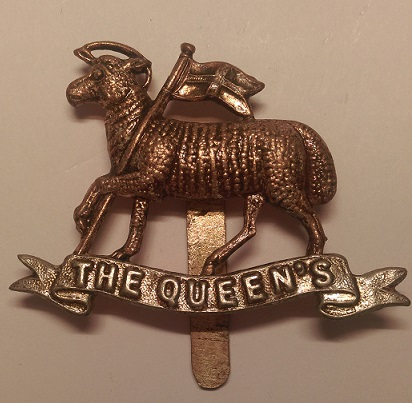
The Paschal Lamb cap badge of The Queen's.

== 14th Battalion, Queen's Royal Regiment (West Surrey) ==
14th Battalion, Queen's Royal Regiment (West Surrey), was formed on 4 July 1940 at Dorchester, Dorset Along with 13th Queen's and 9th and 10th Hampshire Regiment, the battalion was assigned to 201st Independent Infantry Brigade (Home) on its formation on 4 October 1940 by No 1 Infantry Training Group in Aldershot Command. The brigade was a static home defence formation and first came under XII Corps from 19 October, and was then assigned to the West Sussex County Division when that was formed on 9 November. West Sussex County Division was disbanded on 17 February 1941 and on 21 February the brigade moved to Yorkshire Area, joining the Yorkshire County Division on its formation on 19 March. 14th Queens left 201st Bde on 3 June 1941.

The battalion was commanded by Lieutenant-Colonel Alexander Wilkinson. When a number of his men strayed into a minefield several were killed, and one injured man could be seen in the middle of the mined area, still moving. Royal Engineers had been sent for to clear the mines, and a doctor who happened to be present gave the opinion that the wounded man was unlikely to survive. Whilst the doctor was talking to the other officer present, Wilkinson entered the minefield, and managed to bring out the wounded man single-handed. For those actions, Wilkinson was awarded the George Medal (GM) on 8 July 1941.

== 99th LAA Regiment ==
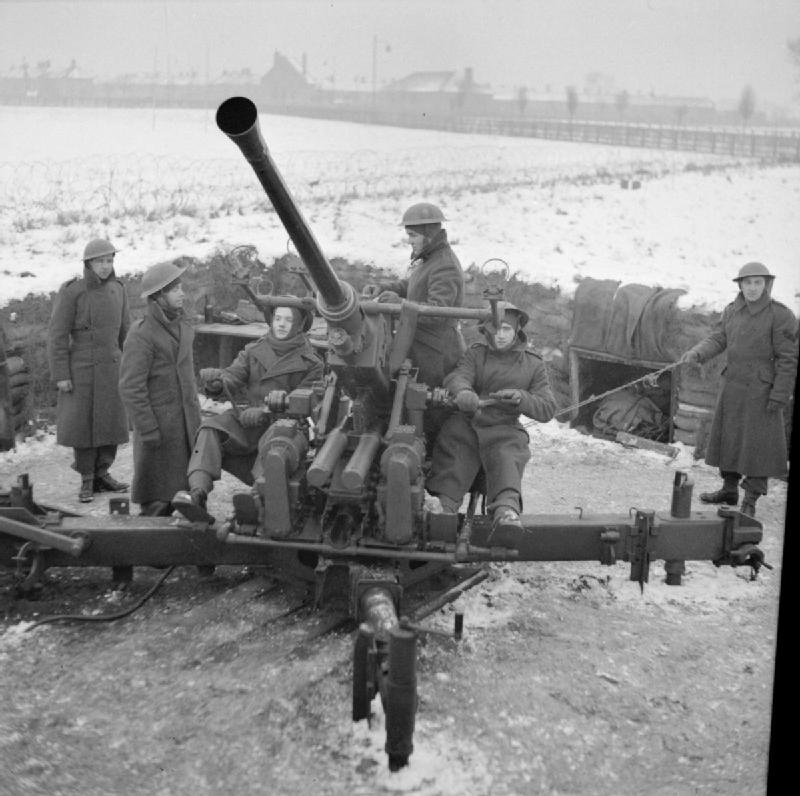
A Bofors 40 mm LAA gun crew under training, January 1942.

Later in 1941 the battalion was selected to be retrained in the light anti-aircraft (LAA) role equipped with Bofors 40 mm guns: on 1 December 1941 it transferred to the Royal Artillery (RA) as 99th LAA Regiment, comprising Regimental Headquarters (RHQ) and 327, 328 and 329 LAA Batteries. The new regiment was originally part of Anti-Aircraft Command, but left before it was allocated to a brigade, and instead it joined 44th (Home Counties) Division on 3 February 1942 as that formation's air defence unit. However, it left again on 25 March 1942, replaced by a more experienced LAA regiment that went overseas with 44th (HC) Division.

=== Middle East ===
At the end of August 99th LAA Rgt came under War Office control preparatory to going overseas itself. It was sent to Basra to join 4th AA Brigade in Persia and Iraq Command (PAIFORCE) where General Henry Maitland Wilson was trying to build up the AA resources to meet a possible German advance on the vital oilfields via the Caucasus.

However, Wilson's planned AA defences never reached their full extent because after the German defeat at the Battle of Stalingrad the Luftwaffe was not in a position to attack Iraq or Persia. From April 1943 the AA defences of PAIFORCE were run down. Instead, 99th LAA Rgt joined Middle East Forces by 23 May 1943.

=== Husky ===
By now the North African Campaign was over and the Allies were preparing an invasion of Sicily (Operation Husky). Given the large number of Axis aircraft that would be in range of the landing beaches, AA defence was a high priority. AA batteries were allotted individually to composite Beach groups (or Beach Bricks as they were known in the Mediterranean Theatre) whose role was to secure, defend and control the landing beaches. RHQ of 99th LAA Regiment under Lt-Col Wilkinson commanded the AA components of No 34 Beach Brick, with 327 LAA Bty and 304 HAA Bty of 100th Heavy AA Rgt, while 328 LAA Bty was under RHQ 100th HAA Rgt in No 35 Beach Brick. Intensive training with landing craft began in Egypt in May, then the bricks went 2,300 miles (3,700 km) by road convoy to Tunis for embarkation, leaving their rear elements to follow later by sea. In the event, No 35 Beach Brick was not employed for Husky, but No 34 was in the assault landing, as was 329 LAA Bty.

Some of the 'Husky' convoys were discovered and attacked en route, but the assault landings began at 02.45 on 10 July 1943. Opposition on the beaches to the assault troops was light, and the beach bricks began landing. The advance parties of AA gunners were equipped as infantry, prepared for a firefight, but most were quickly able to move to the selected gunsites. No 34 Beach Brick was unlucky: the Landing Craft Infantry (LCI) carrying the advance party smashed its ramp, came under fire, and veered off course, finally landing the party 4 miles (6.4 km) from its intended beach north of Avola. The party had to work along the coast, close to the enemy, through two minefields, before reaching their allotted area, where the guns were being landed from Landing Craft Tanks (LCTs). Lieutenant-Colonel Wilkinson later described the landing to his opposite number of 100th HAA Rgt as 'A very pleasant exercise in Combined Operations with sufficient enemy fire to make it mildly interesting'.

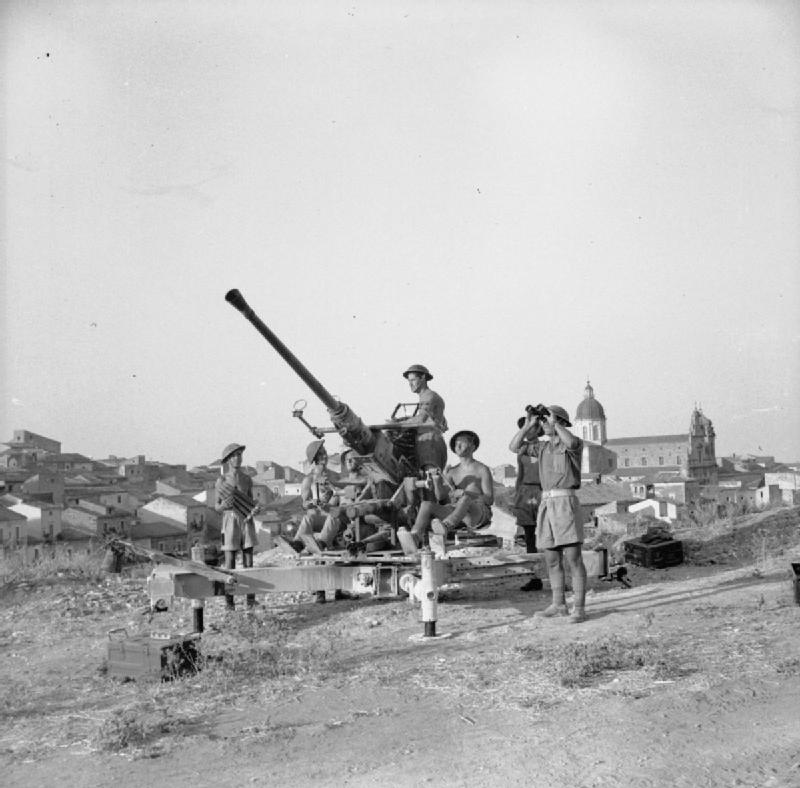
Bofors gun and crew in Sicily, 1943.

Once ashore the LAA batteries were assigned to beach defence, though part of 99th LAA Rgt was soon moved to defend Pachino airfield after its capture. During the morning, the landing beaches and ships came under attack from the Luftwaffe. The AA defences were hampered by the lack of a workable early-warning system and LAA batteries were reduced to firing prepared concentrations, either directional ('Curtains') or overhead ('Umbrellas'), which were ineffective and wasted scarce ammunition. Also, communications could not be established, no overall AA HQ was landed, and coordination was poor: Allied airborne formations overflying the beachheads to their drop zones suffered badly from friendly fire. A great deal of reorganisation was required during the first two days of the operation.

With the beachheads well established, Eighth Army began to move up the coast, Syracuse being taken on 11 July and Augusta on 13 July. As the campaign developed, 327 LAA Bty was stationed at Syracuse under 62nd AA Bde and 329 LAA Bty at Augusta under 73rd AA Bde. Both ports received concentrated raids from the Luftwaffe, with divebombing and strafing attacks by Junkers Ju 88s, Messerschmitt Bf 109s and Focke-Wulf Fw 190s. The AA batteries had arrived with only an 'assault scale' of vehicles, and even these were taken away to help solve Eighth Army's transport crisis, so the units were static. Once the positions round Mount Etna had been outflanked and Catania had been captured, the Axis began withdrawing from Sicily on 11 August, and the campaign was over by 17 August. 327 LAA Battery moved up to join 329 Bty at Augusta.

=== Avalanche ===
Meanwhile, 328 LAA Bty under Maj McColm was still in North Africa as part of No 35 Beach Brick. On 12 August the AA elements of No 35 Beach Brick left Tunis for Bizerta to prepare for the landings at Salerno on the Italian mainland (Operation Avalanche) in which they would come under the command of 12th AA Bde. Intensive training in combined operations began on 16 August. On the night of 17 August, while the troops were preparing for Exercise Jennifer, Bizerta was subjected to a Luftwaffe air raid: the AA guns brought down at least three Ju 88s.

When the assault convoy sailed from Tripoli on 3 September, all of 328 LAA Bty's equipment was transported on LCTs while some of the personnel travelled on LCIs. The 'Avalanche' convoys were located by the Luftwaffe and attacked from the air during their approach to the beaches. When they began landing on 9 September there was no surprise, and with good observation the German shore defences opened heavy fire on the landing craft, causing casualties and delays in unloading. The actual landings were not easy: No 35 Beach Group, for example, was landed on 'Sugar Beach', 2,500 yards (2,300 m) long, but with only two 200 yards (180 m) stretches suitable for disembarkation from LSTs. The infantry landed at 03.30, the first AA reconnaissance parties at 05.30, but at dawn it was obvious that one of the two landing stretches was still being contested. Nonetheless, the first AA LST came in at 07.00, the first Bofors came ashore and went straight into action on the beach under shellfire. USAAF Lightning long-range fighters kept off the early air attacks, but small numbers of Fw 190 Fighter-bombers made low-level attacks at noon and in the afternoon, one of which was destroyed by 328 LAA Bty. By 23.00, the battery had 17 Bofors guns ashore, three of them deployed in anti-tank positions.

For 10 days the beachhead battle raged within 3,000 yards (2,700 m) of the shore and it was impossible to implement the second stage of the planned AA deployment. Enemy fighter-bombers attacked in small numbers day and night, and those batteries already in position were heavily engaged in warding off multiple attacks delivered with little warning. The AA units received inadequate reports from Royal Air Force and Royal Navy radar, and had to rely on the HAA batteries' own gun-laying radar plots. 12 AA Brigade's HQ radar instructor controlled AA concentrations covering the inland approaches, and a ring of concentrations over the bay was prepared against torpedo-dropping aircraft. Smokescreens laid by 12 AA Bde's pioneers eased the situation.

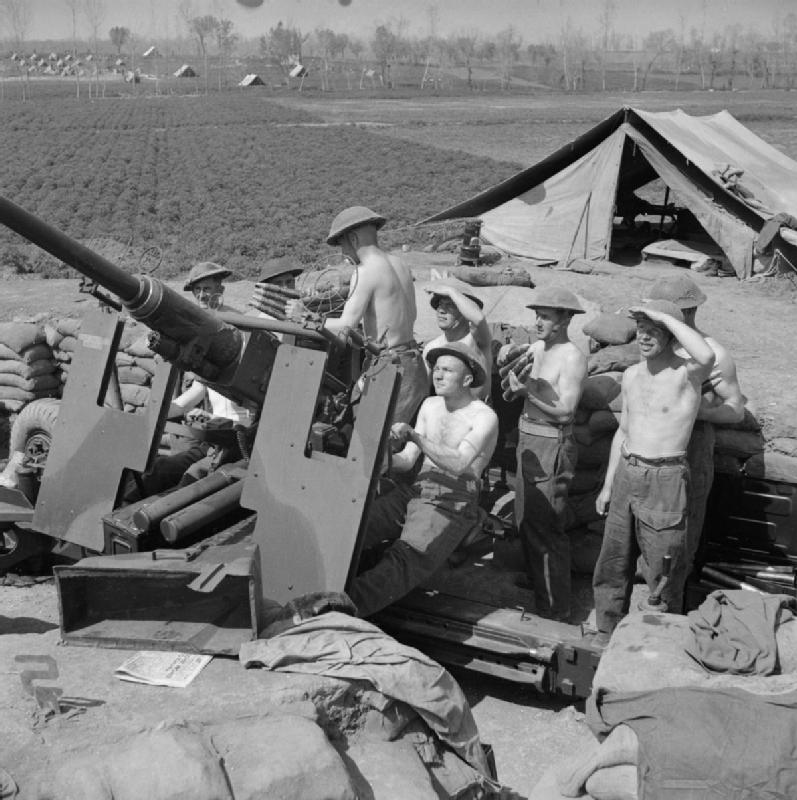
A Bofors gun crew in Italy, April 1944

In the meantime the ground battle raged for 10 days, with the AA batteries joining in, while some of the later AA arrivals were hastily formed into an infantry force to deal with German infiltration into the beachhead. At one point brigade HQ was driven out of its position by mortar fire. However, by 17 September the breakout was achieved and the landing force began driving north to capture Naples while the Germans withdrew slowly to a position north of the River Volturno. While 12th AA Bde moved up to protect Naples and then the Volturno crossings, 22nd AA Bde took over its responsibilities in the rear areas. Eventually the rest of 99th LAA Rgt was brought across from Sicily.

=== Monte Cassino ===
Once across the Volturno, operations slowed down as the Allies faced the German Winter Line, and the AA units had a comparatively stable period of deployment until the end of the year. By January 1944, 99th LAA Rgt was assigned to duties for corps HQs. As the Allies prepared for the crossing of the Garigliano to begin the assault on Monte Cassino, 12th AA Bde brigade moved forward to cover the assembly areas and ferry sites, and 99th LAA Rgt rejoined it. Afterwards the brigade's LAA batteries defended the Garigliano bridges against frequent Luftwaffe fighter-bomber attacks. While the HAA batteries contributed ground fire from elevated positions in the hills, the LAA gunners were sometimes called in to carry supplies up to these gun positions at night and under mortar fire.

LAA batteries at the bridges also operated a smokescreen during daylight hours to deny observation from the German positions on Monte Cassino. 99th LAA Regiment had been detailed to make smoke to cover the bridges over the Gari River, when it was reported on 13 May that there was no smoke covering one particular bridge (codenamed Amazon). Lt-Col Wilkinson took a jeep to investigate the situation for himself. He found the jeep trailer with the smoke-making equipment, which he then loaded into his own jeep. It was later determined that both officers responsible for the bridge had been injured (one killed), and the sergeant had also been killed, and initial supplies of smoke canisters had been exhausted. Wilkinson proceeded to cross the bridge on foot, under mortar and small arms fire, carrying replacement smoke canisters. He managed to begin the re-establishment of the smoke screen, left the one man still there tending the new smoke canisters, and gathered an additional party of men to ensure the screen was maintained. For these actions he was awarded a Distinguished Service Order (DSO) on 21 September 1944.

At this time the AA guns were finding other uses. LAA troops were included in fireplans for defended localities and Bofors guns were often employed to harass known enemy machine gun and mortar positions out to a range of 1,000 yards (910 m) or more. A concentrated burst of fire at 120 rounds per minute when a machine gun opened fire was usually effective at suppression. Some infantry commanders were keen for Bofors to 'brown' any area from which an attack was anticipated. By the autumn of 1944 several LAA regiments were operating as infantry to hold sections of the front line.

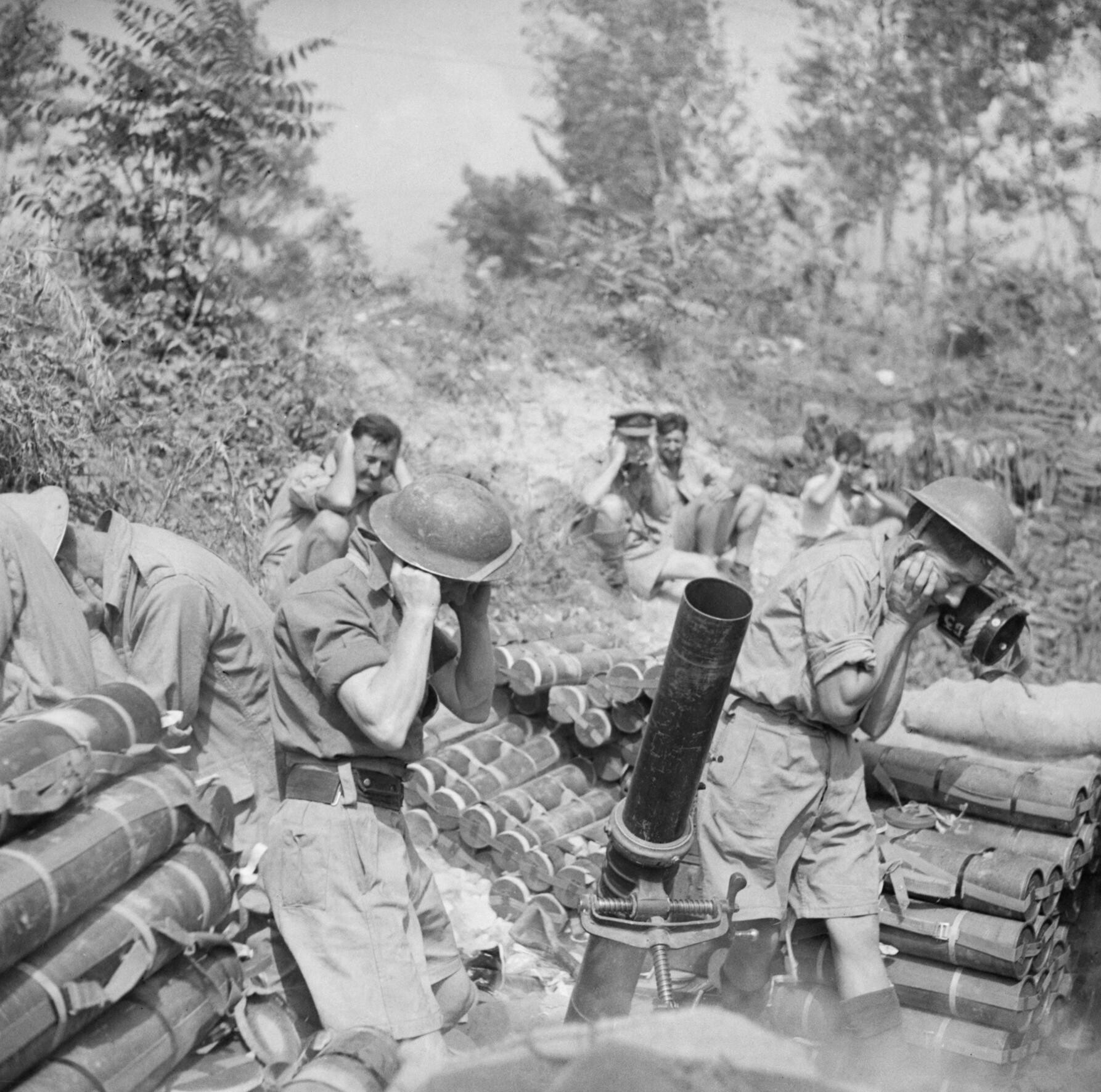
Gunners of S Troop, 327 Bty, 99th AA Regiment, in action with the 4.2-inch mortar for the first time at Cassino, 12 May 1944.

The renewed attack on Cassino (Operation Diadem) began on the night of 11/12 May, with the brigade's LAA regiments committed to bridges, defiles, assembly areas and artillery positions while enemy aircraft were active in low-level strafing and bombing. However, some LAA units, including 327 Bty, assisted the fireplan by manning 4.2-inch mortars. Once the breakthrough had been achieved and the Allies were advancing along Highway 6 up the Liri Valley there were severe problems in getting the AA guns forward along the heavily congested routes. 12 AA Brigade found itself stretched along 80 miles (130 km) of roads protecting the long 'tail', though the Luftwaffe made only a few nuisance raids. After the breakout from the Anzio beachhead and the capture of Rome in early June, the Germans pulled back to the Gothic Line.

The gravely weakened Luftwaffe was unable to influence any of these operations. Meanwhile British forces in Italy were suffering an acute manpower shortage. In June 1944 the Chiefs of Staff decided that the number of AA regiments in Italy must be reduced – LAA regiments were reduced from 54 to 36 guns – their surplus personnel being converted to other roles, particularly infantry. Even without conversion several LAA regiments were operating as infantry to hold sections of the front line by the autumn of 1944.

After the capture of Rome, 99th LAA Rgt was with 12th AA Bde left guarding airfields and river crossings in the Tiber Valley. In August, 12 AA Bde and its units were transferred to the Adriatic front. Over the following months Eighth Army slowly advanced to the Gothic Line positions. During this period the brigade mainly supported II Polish Corps.

=== Disbandment ===
By late 1944, the Luftwaffe was suffering from such shortages of pilots, aircraft and fuel that serious air attacks could be discounted. As a result further cuts could be made in AA units to address the British reinforcement crisis. 99th LAA Regiment together with 327, 328 and 329 LAA Btys was disbanded on 1 October 1944.
