= 207th Independent Infantry Brigade =

207th Independent Infantry Brigade (Home)
- Active: 10 October 1940 – 24 January 1944
- Country: United Kingdom
- Branch: British Army
- Type: Infantry Brigade
- Role: Home Defence

The 207th Independent Infantry Brigade was a Home Defence formation of the British Army during the Second World War.

== Origin ==
The brigade was formed for service in the United Kingdom on 10 October 1940 by No 7 Infantry Training Group in Scottish Command. Under the name of 207th Independent Infantry Brigade (Home) it was initially composed of newly raised infantry battalions from the North of England.

== Service ==
Early in its service the brigade came under the administrative control 18th Infantry Division (2 November 1940 – 16 February 1941), and then became an integral part of Essex County Division from its formation until disbandment on 7 October 1941, when the brigade was renamed the 207th Independent Infantry Brigade. However, the brigade's battalions had all left in the previous August for conversion to Royal Armoured Corps regiments for service in India. The Brigade HQ then moved to the Orkney and Shetland Defences (OSDEF) and once more took infantry battalions under its command. On 24 January 1944 the Brigade HQ returned to mainland United Kingdom and was re-designated HQ 8 Base Sub-Area.

== Order of battle ==
The composition of 207th Brigade was as follows:

- As part of 18th Division and the Essex County Division
  - 9th Battalion, Duke of Wellington's Regiment (10 October 1940 — 27 August 1941, converted that year to the 146th Regiment Royal Armoured Corps)
  - 13th Battalion, Sherwood Foresters (10 October 1940 — 22 July 1941, converted the next year to the 163rd Regiment Royal Armoured Corps)
  - 7th Battalion, King's Own Yorkshire Light Infantry (10 October 1940 — 26 August 1941, converted that year to the 149th Regiment Royal Armoured Corps)
  - 10th Battalion, York and Lancaster Regiment (10 October 1940 — 16 November 1940, and 17 February – 25 August 1941, converted that year to the 150th Regiment Royal Armoured Corps)
  - 8th Battalion, York and Lancaster Regiment (8–17 November 1940)
- As part of the Orkney and Shetland Defences
  - 11th Battalion, Gordon Highlanders (5 November 1941 – 27 May 1942)
  - 15th Battalion, Argyll and Sutherland Highlanders (5 November 1941 – 27 May 1942)
  - 9th Battalion, South Lancashire Regiment (11 February 1942 – 10 August 1943)
  - 2nd Battalion, Gordon Highlanders (28 May 1942 – 28 July 1943)
  - 2nd Battalion, Argyll and Sutherland Highlanders (28 May 1942 – 14 July 1943)
  - 7th Battalion, King's Own Scottish Borderers (15 July – 3 December 1943)
  - 7th Battalion, North Staffordshire Regiment (29 July – 2 November 1943)
  - 13th Battalion, Highland Light Infantry (11 August 1943 – 17 January 1944)
  - 1st Battalion, South Wales Borderers (1 December 1943 – 23 January 1944)
  - 15th Battalion, Welch Regiment (17–23 January 1944)

Brigade headquarters reformed as HQ 8 Base Sub-Area.

== Commanders ==
The commanders of 207th Bde were:

- Brigadier A.L. Collier (until 12 October 1941)
- Brigadier R.N. Stewart (from 208th Brigade, until 14 February 1943)
- Brigadier J.F.S. McLaren (until 6 December 1943)
