= Divisional insignia of the British Army =

Formation signs at the division level were first introduced in the British Army in the First World War. They were intended (initially) as a security measure to avoid displaying the division's designation in the clear. They were used on vehicles, sign posts and notice boards and were increasingly, but not universally, worn on uniform as the War progressed. Discontinued by the regular army after 1918, only a few Territorial divisions continued to wear them before 1939. Reintroduced officially in late 1940 in the Second World War, divisional formation signs were much more prevalent on uniforms and were taken up by many other formations, independent brigades, corps, armies, overseas and home commands, military districts and lines of communication areas. The sign could be based on many things, geometry (simple or more complex), heraldry, regional or historical associations, a pun, the role of the division or a combination.

== First World War ==
Until 1916, unit names were written on vehicles, notice boards and camp flags, when an order to end this insecure practice was given to adopt a 'device, mark or sign' particular to that division. Initially only a few divisions wore the division sign as a badge on clothing, including some which had been wearing one before the order. This practice became more widespread, especially in 1918 but not universal. The 43rd, 44th and 45th Divisions (all first line territorial) were sent to India to relieve the regular army there and did not adopt division insignia, as did numbers of second line territorial and home service divisions.

Battle Patches were distinct signs used at the battalion level as a means of identification on the battlefield, although some continued the scheme to include company and even platoon signs. Consisting of relatively simple shapes and colours they were introduced by Kitchener's Army troops in 1915 and could follow a divisional or brigade scheme or be based on the regimental colours or insignia. They were worn on the sleeves, the back of the tunic or painted on the helmet. (Examples: 23rd Division and 50th (Northumbrian) Division.)

=== Infantry ===
Guards Division

1st Division

2nd Division

3rd Division

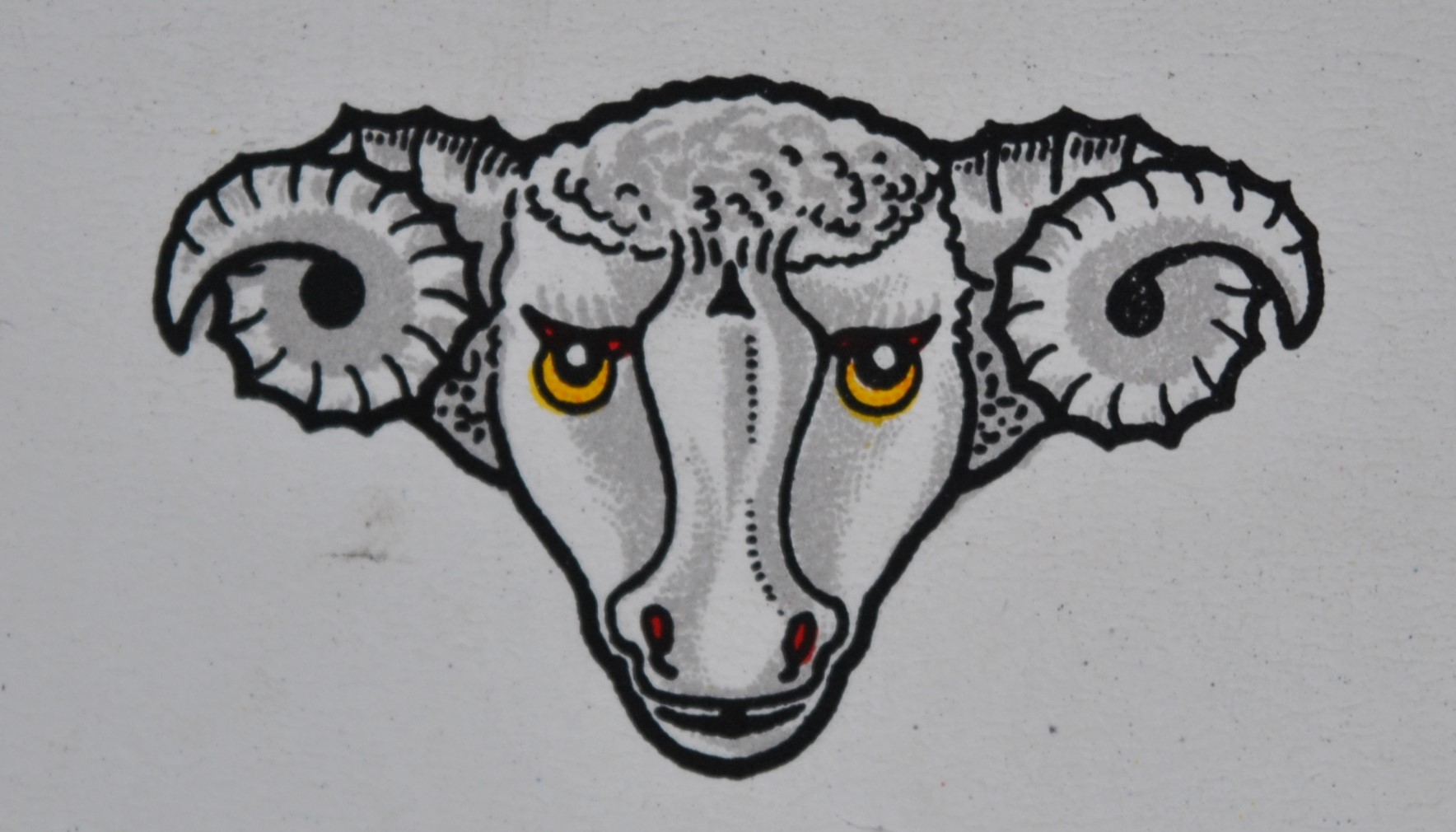
4th Division

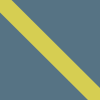
5th Division

6th Division

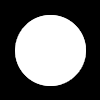
7th Division

8th Division

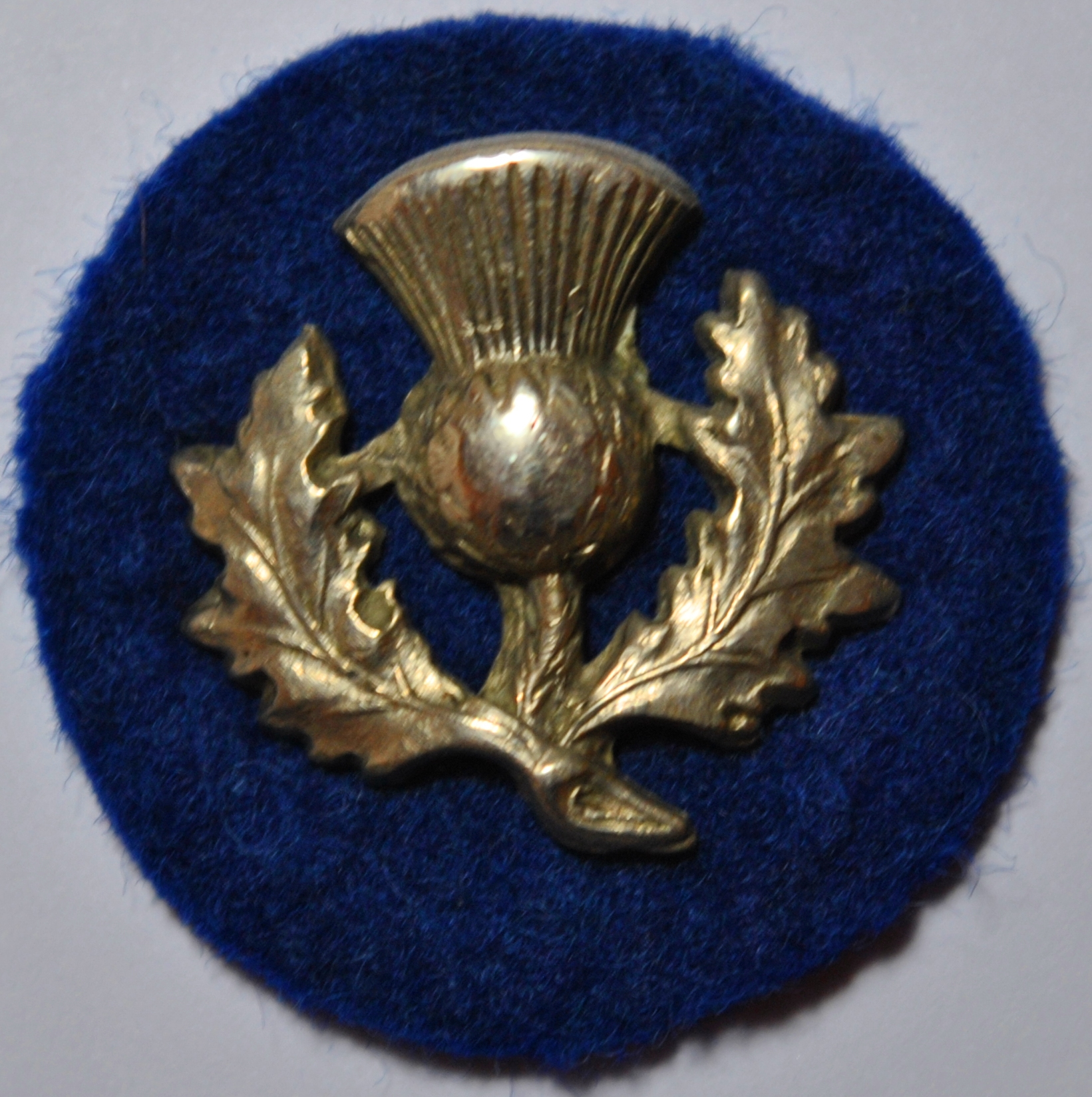
9th (Scottish) Division

10th (Irish) Division

11th (Northern) Division

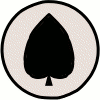
12th (Eastern) Division

13th (Western) Division

14th (Light) Division

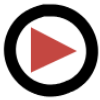
15th (Scottish) Division

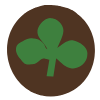
16th (Irish) Division

17th (Northern) Division

18th (Eastern) Division

19th (Western) Division

20th (Light) Division

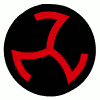
21st Division

22nd Division

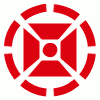
23rd Division

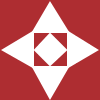
24th Division

25th Division
Uniform patch.

25th Division
Vehicle sign.

26th Division

27th Division

28th Division

29th Division

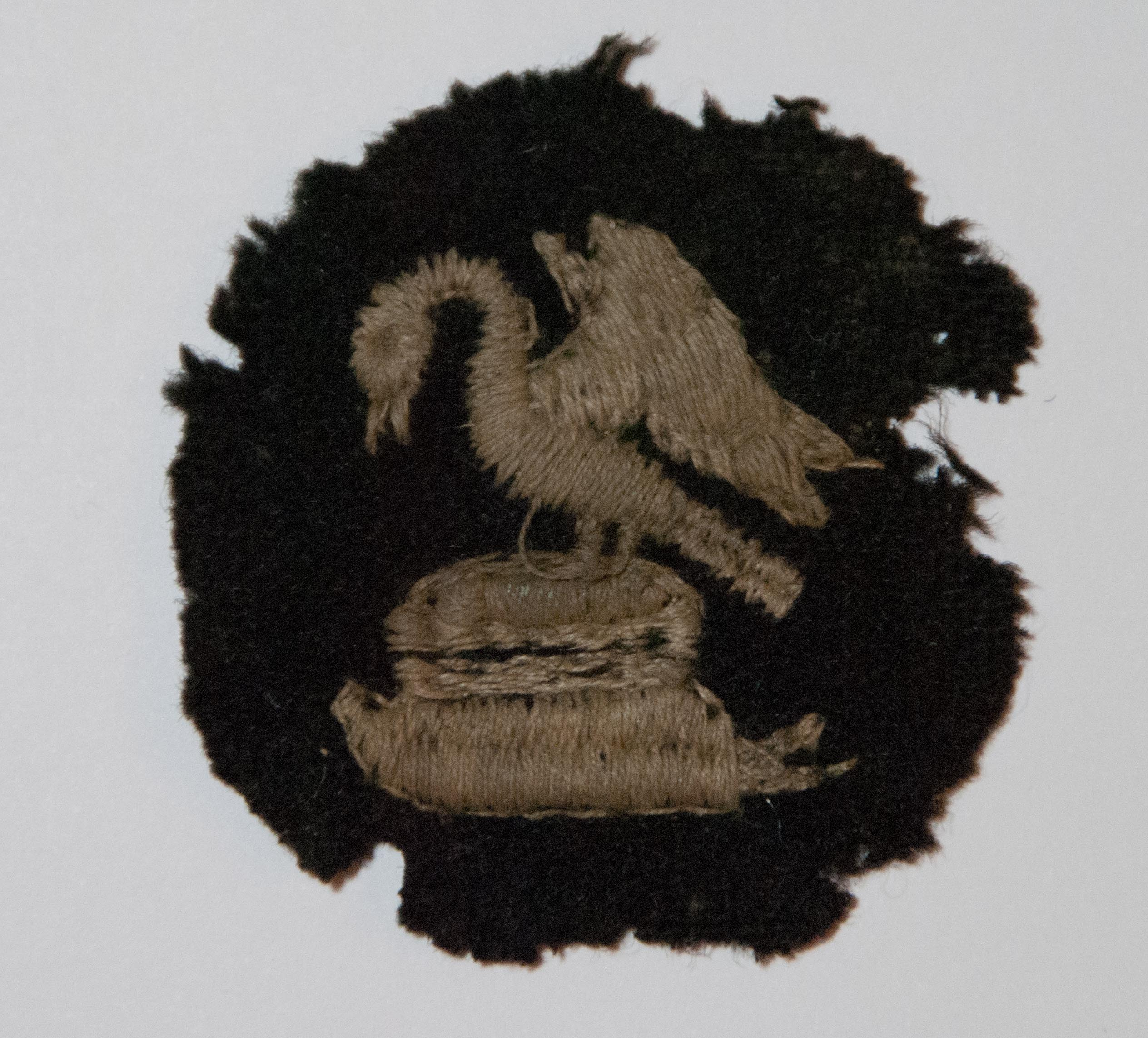
30th Division

31st Division
First pattern.

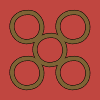
32nd Division

33rd Division

34th Division

35th Division

36th (Ulster) Division

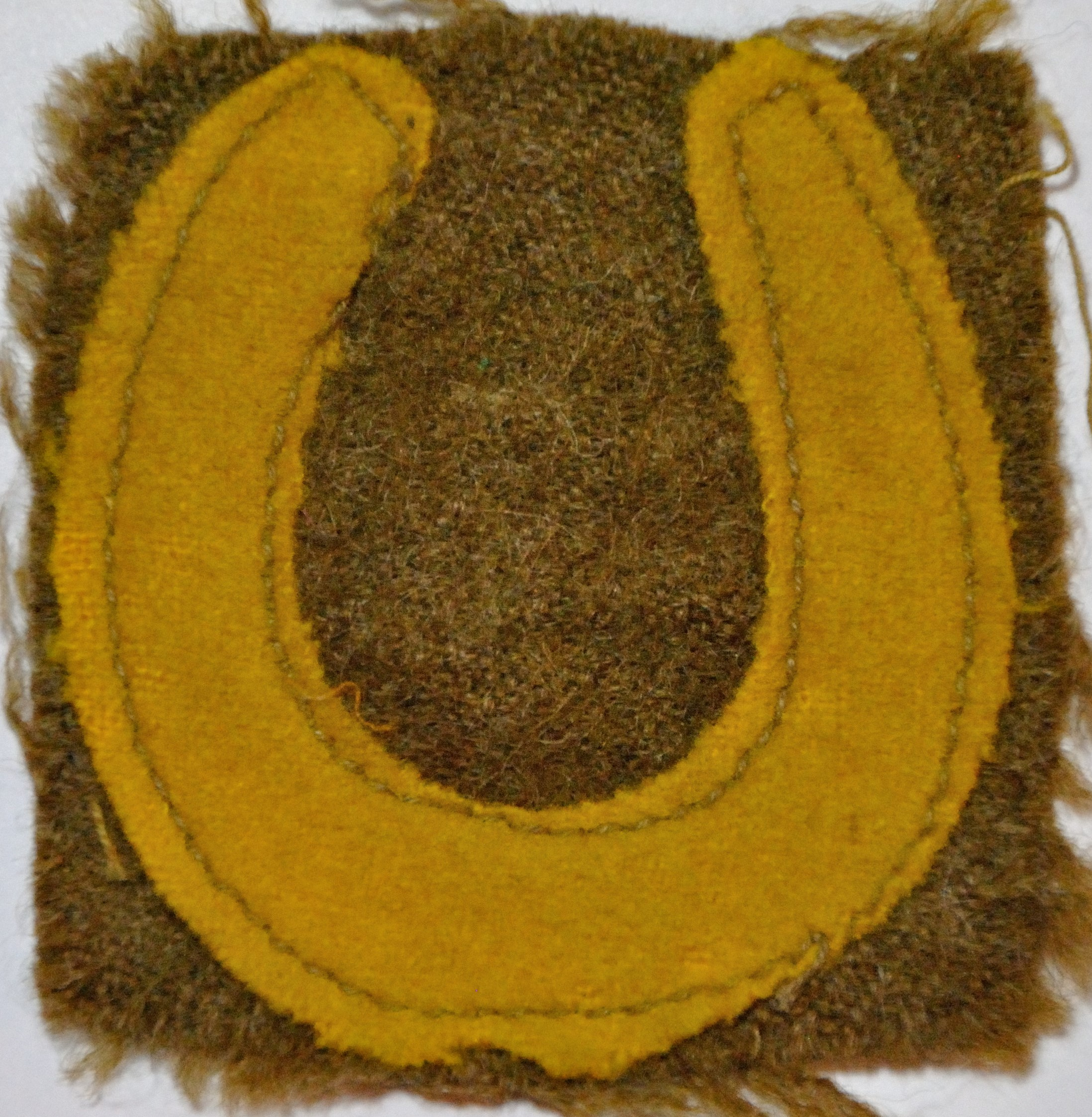
37th Division

38th (Welsh) Infantry Division

39th Division

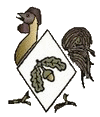
40th Division

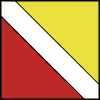
41st Division

42nd (East Lancashire) Infantry Division

46th (North Midland) Division

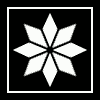
47th (1/2nd London) Division

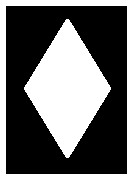
48th (South Midland) Division

49th (West Riding) Infantry Division

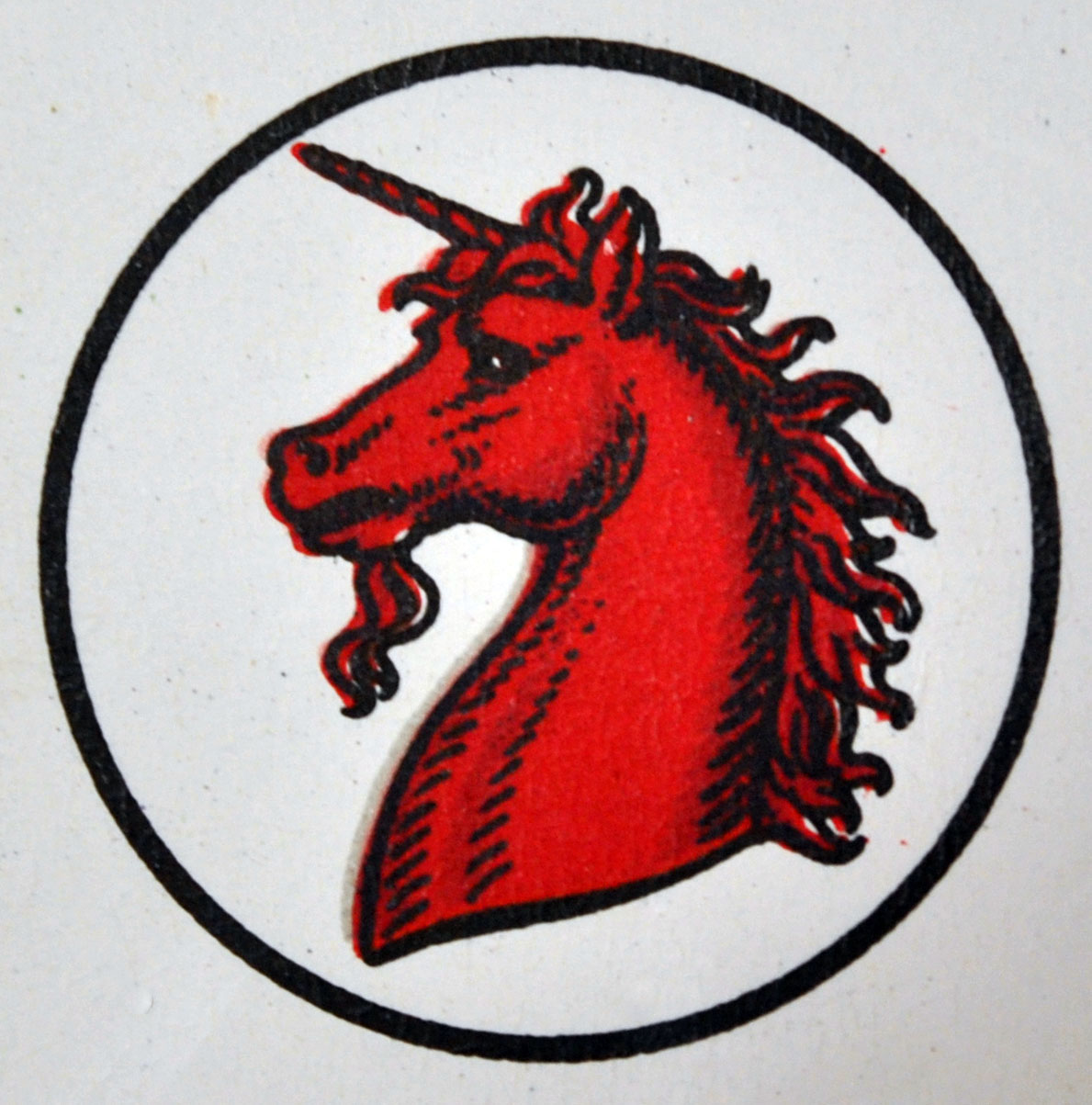
50th (Northumbrian) Division

51st (Highland) Division

52nd (Lowland) Division

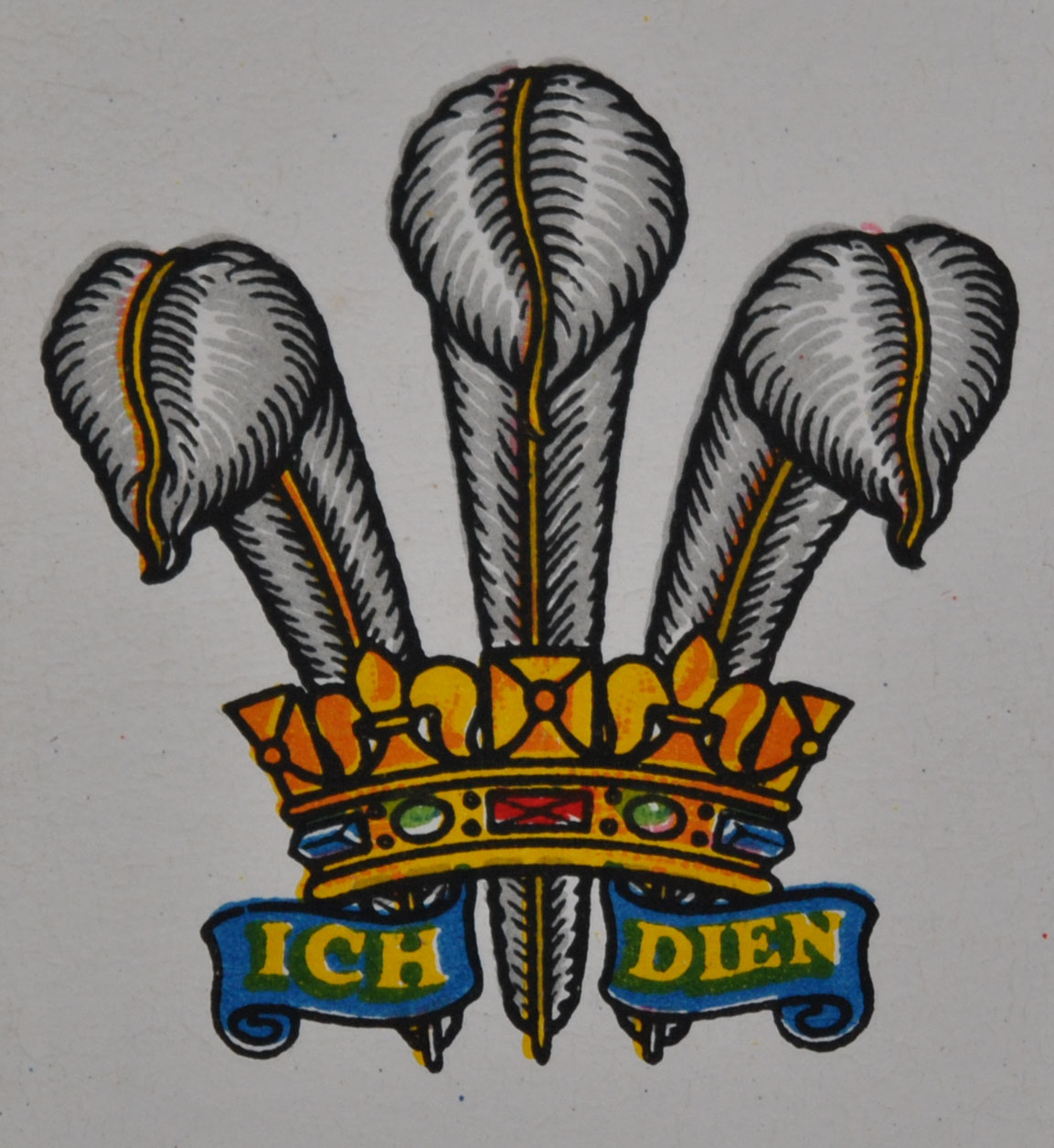
53rd (Welsh) Division

54th Division

55th (West Lancashire) Division

56th (London) Infantry Division

57th (2nd West Lancashire) Division

59th (2nd North Midland) Division

60th (2/2nd London) Division

61st (2nd South Midland) Division

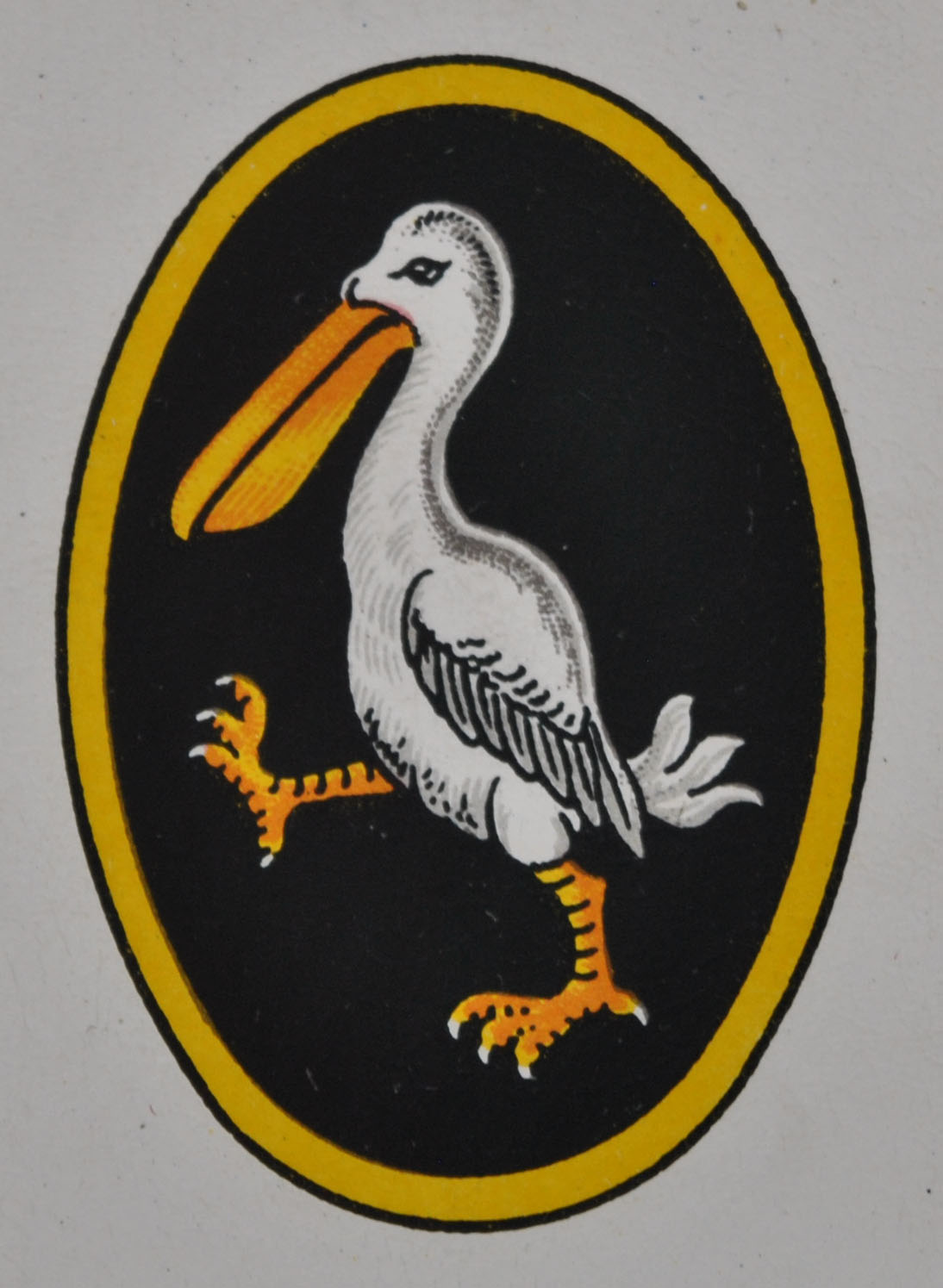
62nd (2nd West Riding) Division

63rd (Royal Naval) Division

66th (2nd East Lancashire) Division

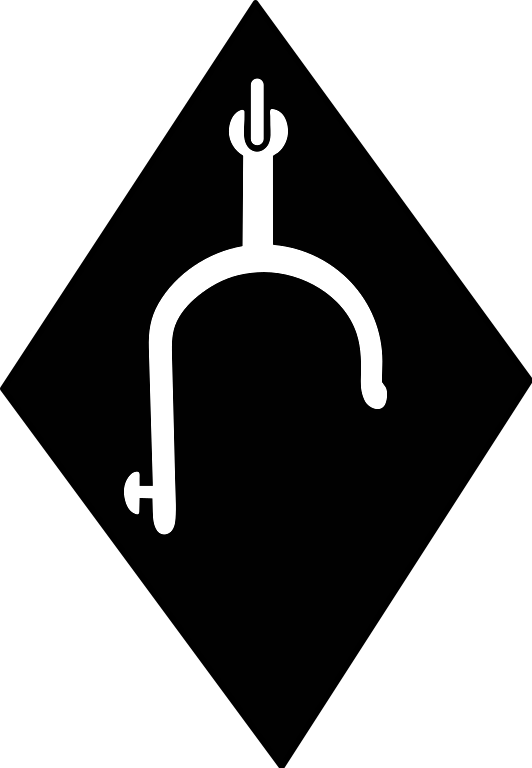
74th (Yeomanry) Division

75th Division

=== Cavalry ===
1st Cavalry Division

2nd Cavalry Division

3rd Cavalry Division

=== Empire ===
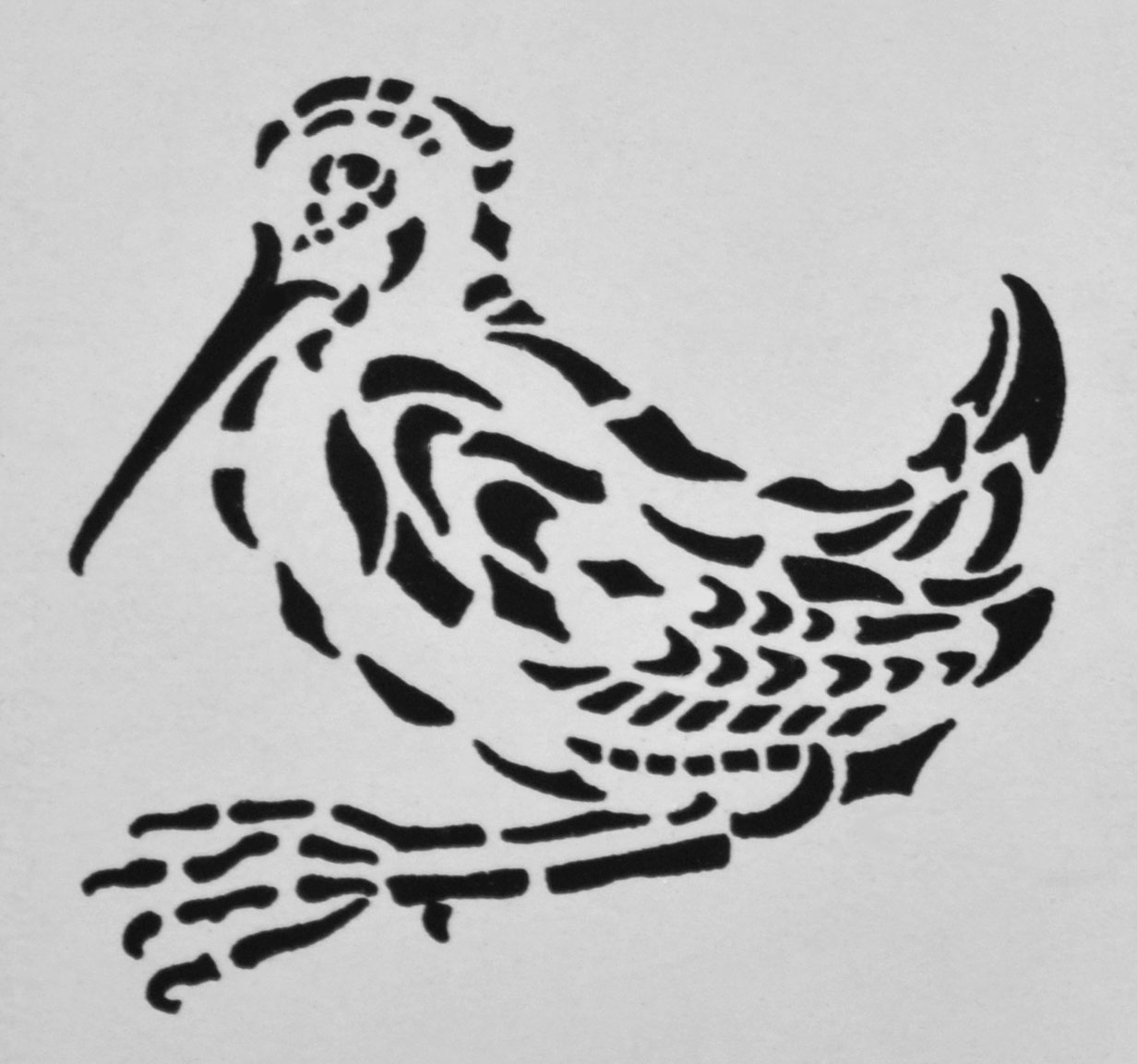
14th Indian Division

15th Indian Division

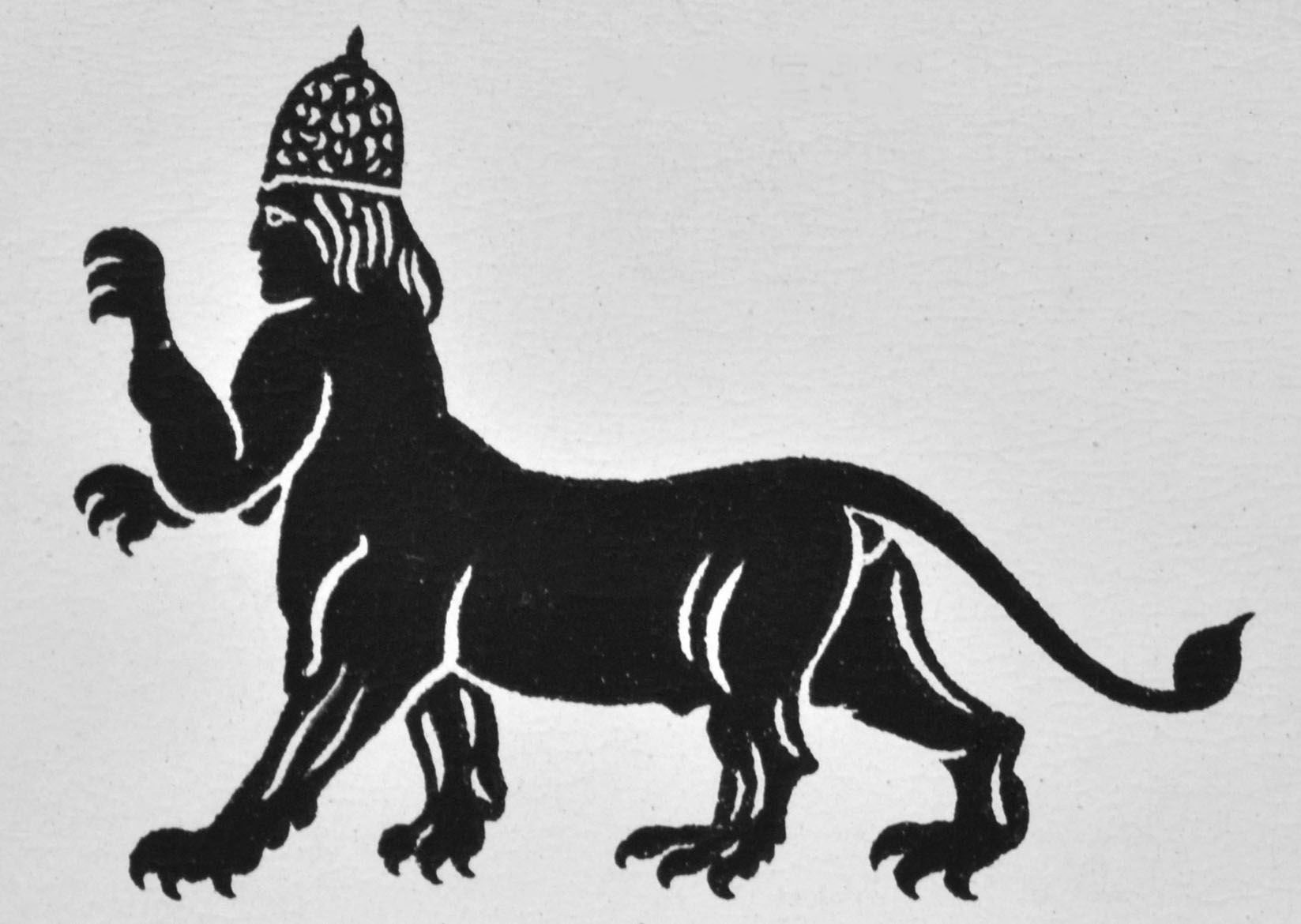
17th Indian Division

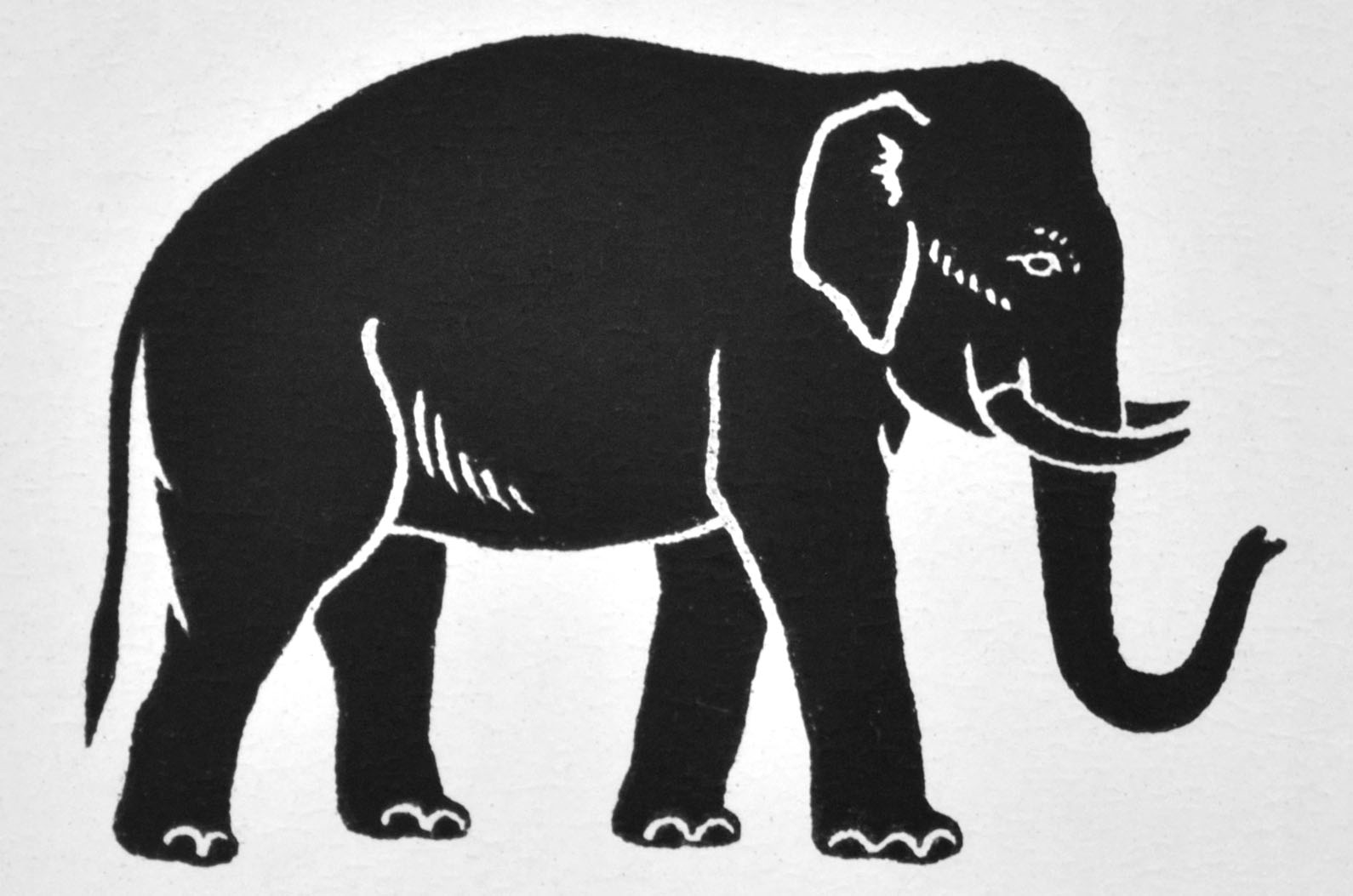
18th Indian Division

=== Commonwealth ===
Canadian divisions used simple colour oblongs as division signs. Each infantry battalion was shown by a colour and shape combination worn above the division sign, green, red or blue for the 1st, 2nd and 3rd brigades in each division and a circle, triangle, half circle or square for each battalion in the brigade. Other marks were used for brigade and division headquarters, machine gun and mortar units. The 5th Canadian division was broken up for reinforcements before being fully formed and would have had a burgundy–purple colour patch.

Australian formation signs used a system whereby the shape of the sign identified the division and the colour-shape combination within the particular unit, with 15 combinations for the infantry alone in each division. The Australian division signs shown below are those for the division headquarters. Infantry intended for a 6th Australian Division was used instead for reinforcements, those infantry battalions used an upright oval.

1st Canadian Division

2nd Canadian Division

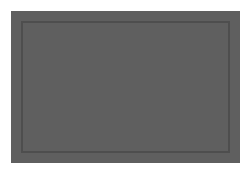
3rd Canadian Division

4th Canadian Division
1st Australian Division
First pattern 1916–1917.

1st Australian Division
Second pattern 1917–1919.

2nd Australian Division

3rd Australian Division

4th Australian Division

5th Australian Division

== Second World War ==
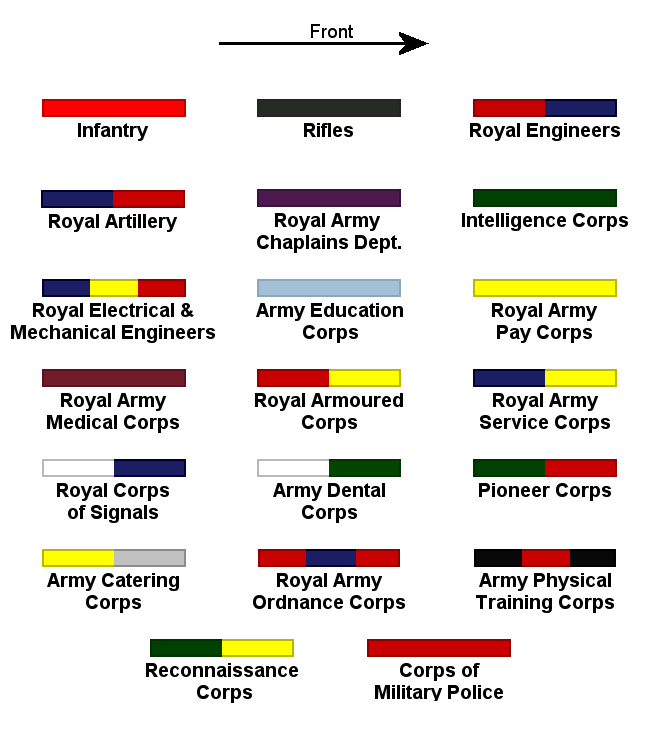
Second World War British battledress arm of service (corps) colours

The use of divisional signs on uniform was discontinued by the regular army after the First World War, although when reformed in 1920, some territorial divisions continued to wear the signs they had adopted previously. By the start of the Second World War, the British Army prohibited all identifying marks on its Battle Dress uniforms save for drab (black or white on khaki) regimental or corps (branch) slip-on titles, and even these were not to be worn in the field. In May 1940 an order (Army Council Instruction (ACI) 419) was issued banning division signs worn on uniforms, even though some were in use on vehicles in France. Some infantry battalions in France had even started wearing battle patches in a similar manner to their First World War antecedents.

In September 1940 ACI 419 was replaced with ACI 1118, and division signs were permitted to be worn on uniform below the shoulder title. Below this was worn an 'arm of service' stripe (2 inches (5.1 cm) by 1/4 inch (0.64 cm)) showing the relevant corps colour (for example Artillery, red and blue, Service Corps, yellow and blue, RAMC dark cherry, and so on, see right). Battalion specific or general regimental patches, in addition to the shoulder title, could also be worn below the arm of service stripe, but the cost of these had to be borne from regimental funds, not the War Office.

Until D-Day these signs were only to be displayed or worn in Britain, if a division went overseas all formation markings had to be removed from vehicles (tactical signs excepted) and uniforms. This order was obeyed to varying degrees in various theatres of war. However, 21st Army Group formations wore their signs when they went to France.

The signs shown below were used as vehicle signs and worn on uniform (except where noted). The short-lived 7th Infantry Division did not have a formation sign and that for the 66th Division was designed but never used. Those for the 12th and 23rd divisions were worn by a small number of troops left behind in Britain. In the British Army, ACI 1118 specified that the design for the formation sign should be approved by the general officer commanding the formation and reported to the War Office. A further order of December 1941 (ACI 2587) specified the material of the uniform patch as printed cotton (ordnance issue), this replaced the embroidered felt (or fulled wool) or metal badges used previously. In other theatres the uniform patch could be made from a variety of materials including printed or woven cotton, woven silk, leather or metal embroidered felt (or fulled wool).

=== Infantry ===
1st Infantry Division
First pattern

1st Infantry Division
Second pattern

2nd Infantry Division

3rd Infantry Division Vehicle Sign in France 1940.

3rd Infantry Division.

4th Infantry Division
First pattern.

4th Infantry Division
Second pattern

5th Infantry Division

6th Infantry Division

8th Infantry Division

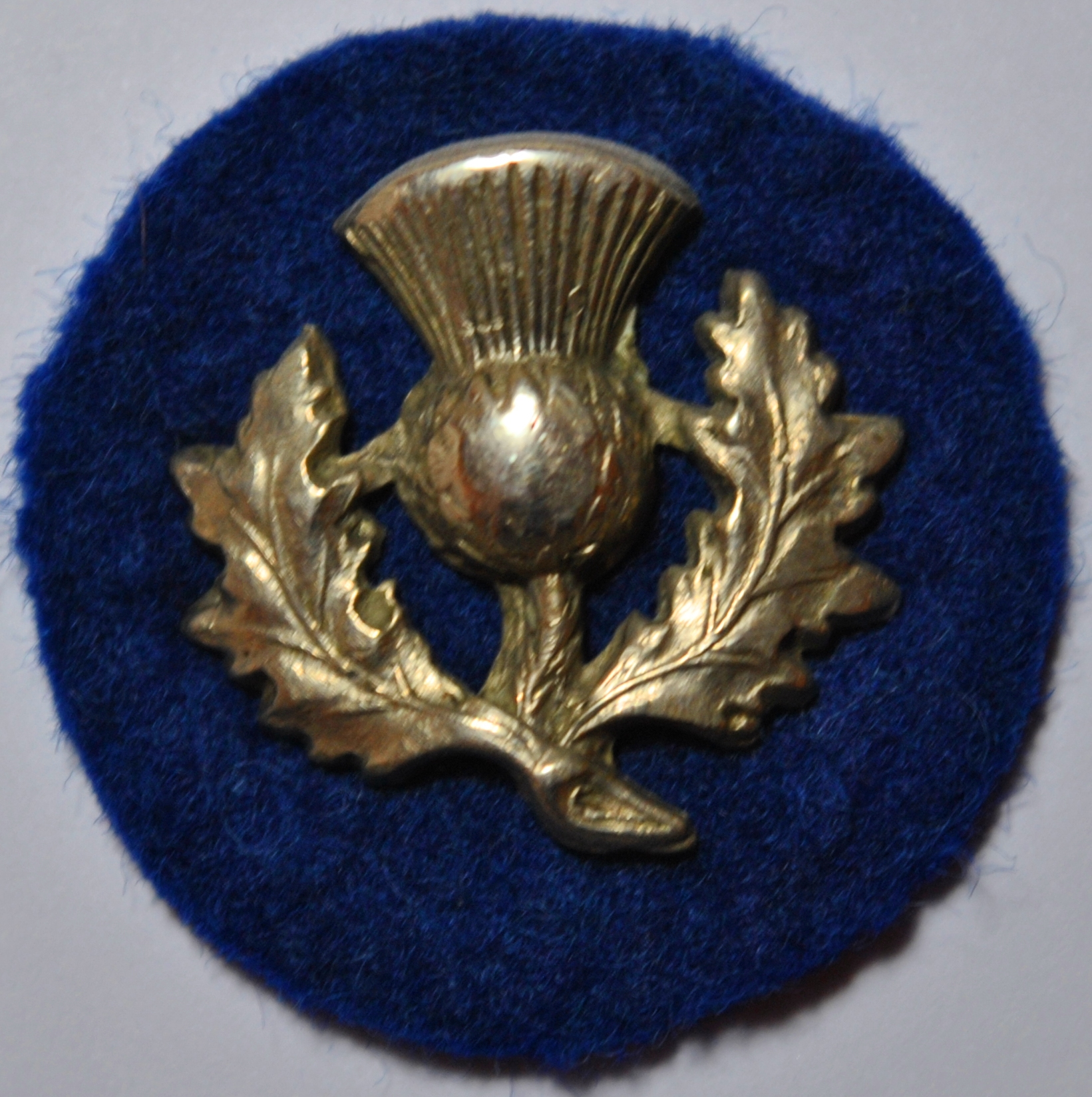
9th (Highland) Infantry Division
Variant in white metal.

12th (Eastern) Infantry Division

15th (Scottish) Infantry Division, 1st pattern.

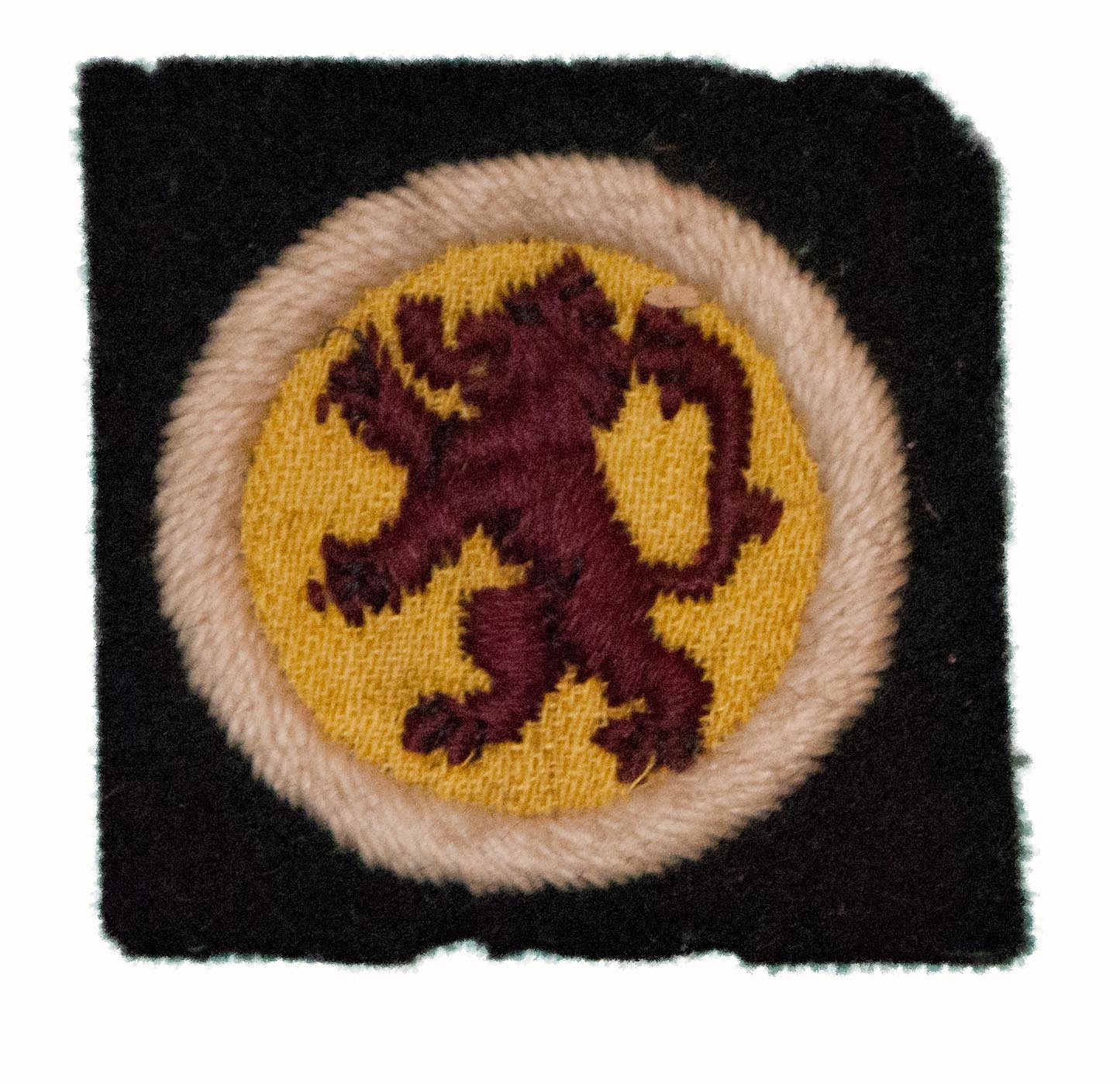
15th (Scottish) Infantry Division, 2nd pattern.

18th Infantry Division

23rd (Northumbrian) Division

36th Infantry Division

38th (Welsh) Infantry Division

42nd (East Lancashire) Infantry Division
Up to late 1941.

43rd (Wessex) Infantry Division

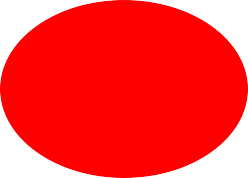
44th (Home Counties) Division

45th Infantry Division

46th Infantry Division

47th (London) Infantry Division

48th (South Midland) Infantry Division

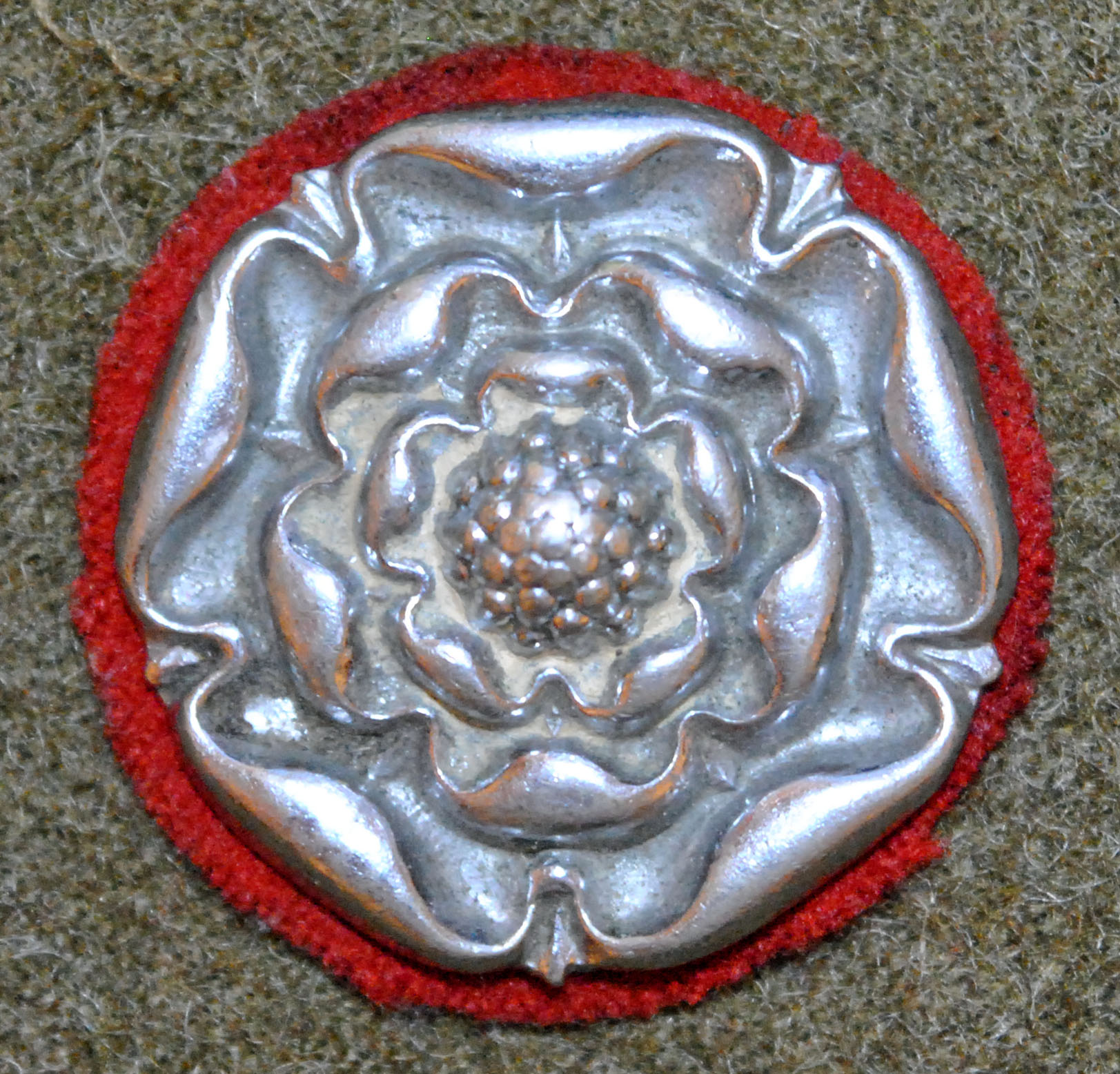
49th (West Riding) Infantry Division
Early War

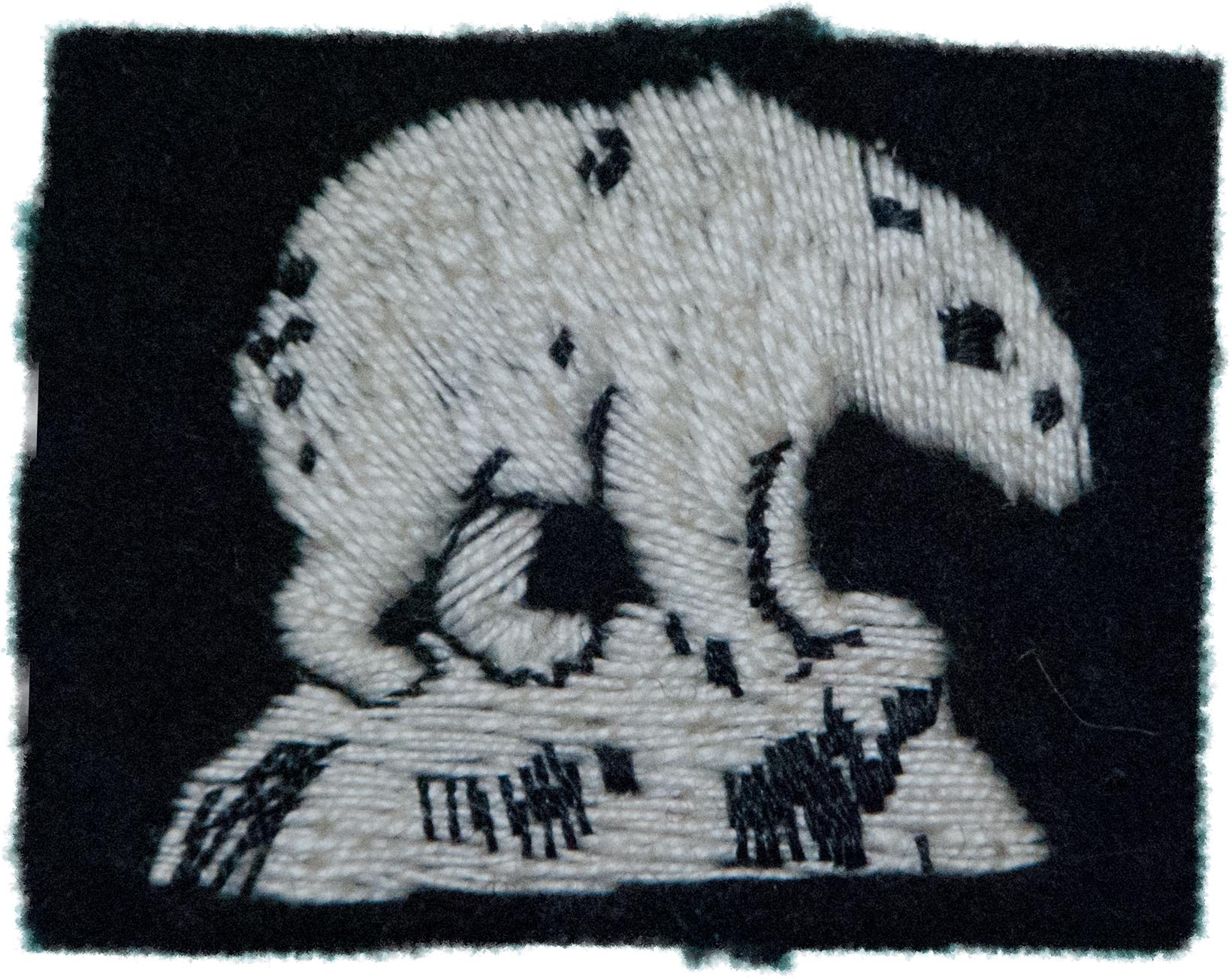
49th (West Riding) Infantry Division
Second Pattern

49th (West Riding) Infantry Division
Final Design

50th (Northumbrian) Infantry Division

51st (Highland) Division.
Unofficial uniform insignia worn in France 1940.

51st (Highland) Division

52nd (Lowland) Infantry Division

53rd (Welsh) Infantry Division

54th (East Anglian) Infantry Division

55th (West Lancashire) Infantry Division vehicle sign

55th (West Lancashire) Infantry Division, uniform sign

56th (London) Infantry Division

59th (Staffordshire) Infantry Division

61st Infantry Division

66th Division

70th Infantry Division

76th Infantry Division

77th Infantry Division

78th Infantry Division

80th Infantry (Reserve) Division

Royal Marines Division

=== Armoured ===
Guards Armoured Division

1st Armoured Division
First pattern.

1st Armoured Division
Second pattern

2nd Armoured Division

6th Armoured Division

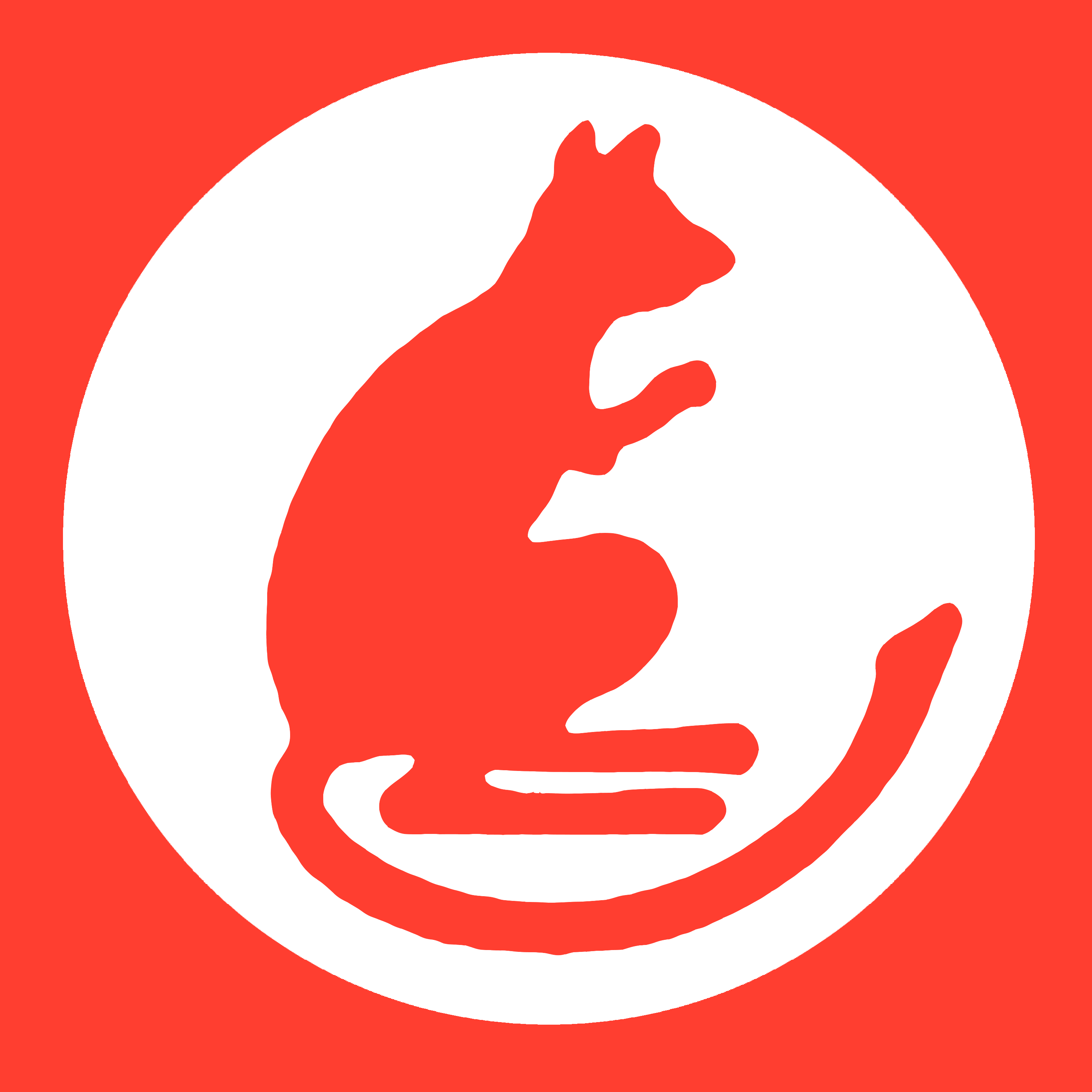
7th Armoured Division
First pattern and vehicle sign throughout the war.

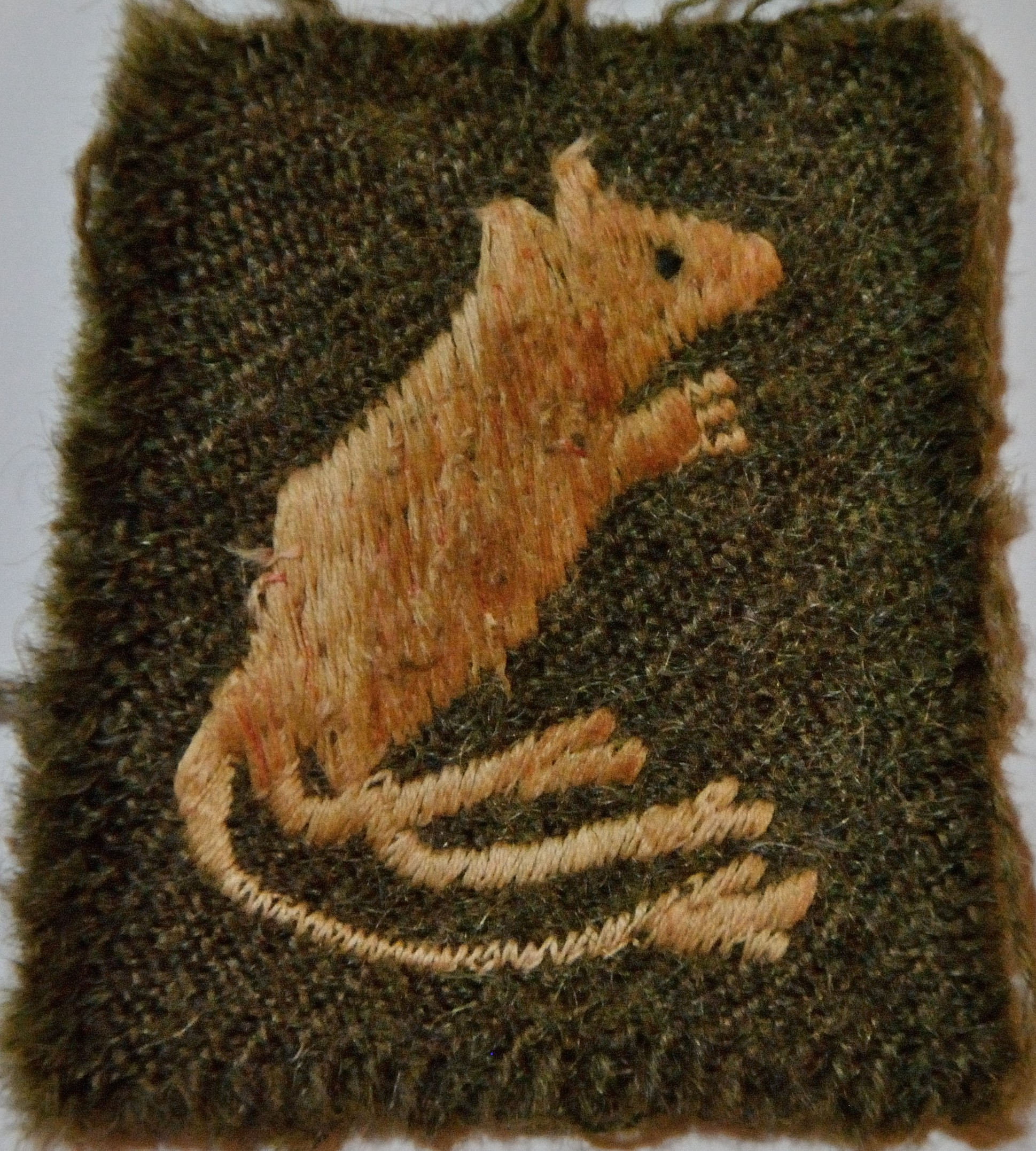
7th Armoured Division, second pattern.

7th Armoured Division, third pattern, used in NW Europe.

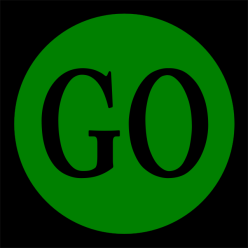
8th Armoured Division

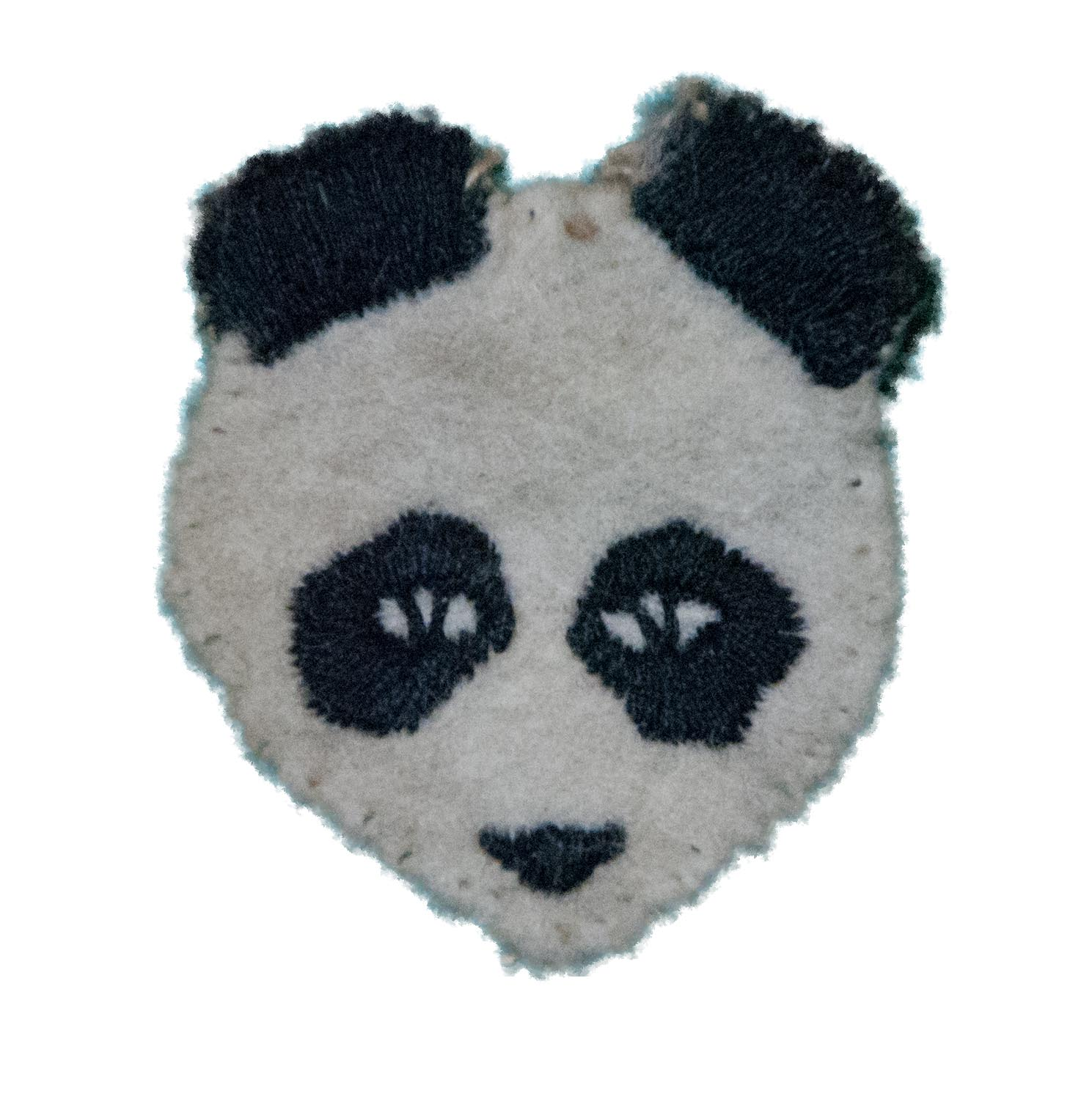
9th Armoured Division

10th Armoured Division

10th Armoured Division
Wide variant.

11th Armoured Division

42nd Armoured Division
from late 1941 to late 1943.

79th Armoured Division

=== Airborne ===
1st Airborne Division

6th Airborne Division

=== Empire ===
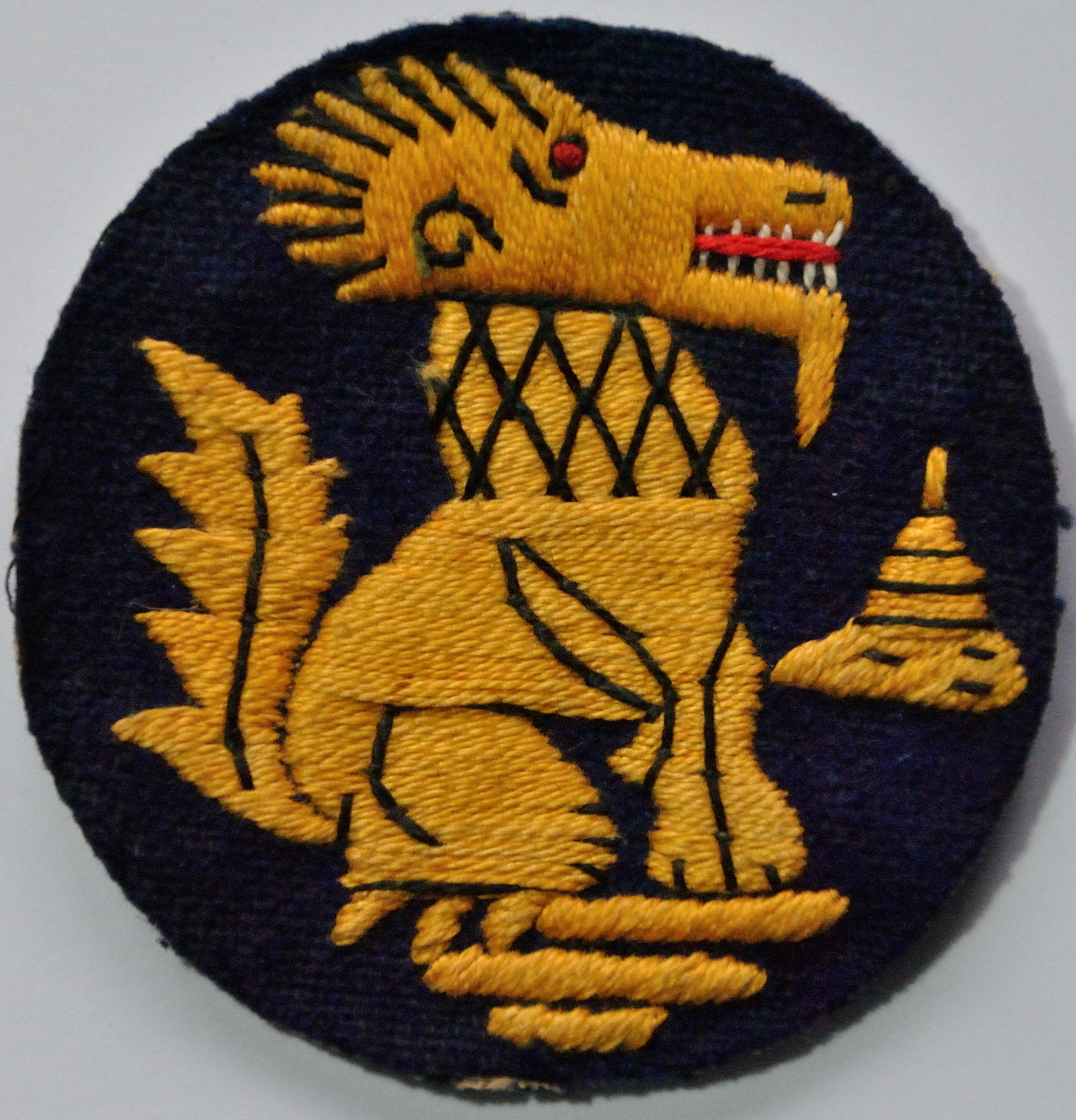
3rd Indian Infantry Division
The Chindits.

4th Indian Division

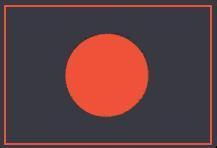
5th Indian Division

6th Infantry Division (India)

7th Indian Infantry Division

8th Indian Infantry Division

9th Indian Infantry Division

10th Indian Infantry Division

11th Indian Infantry Division

14th Indian Infantry Division

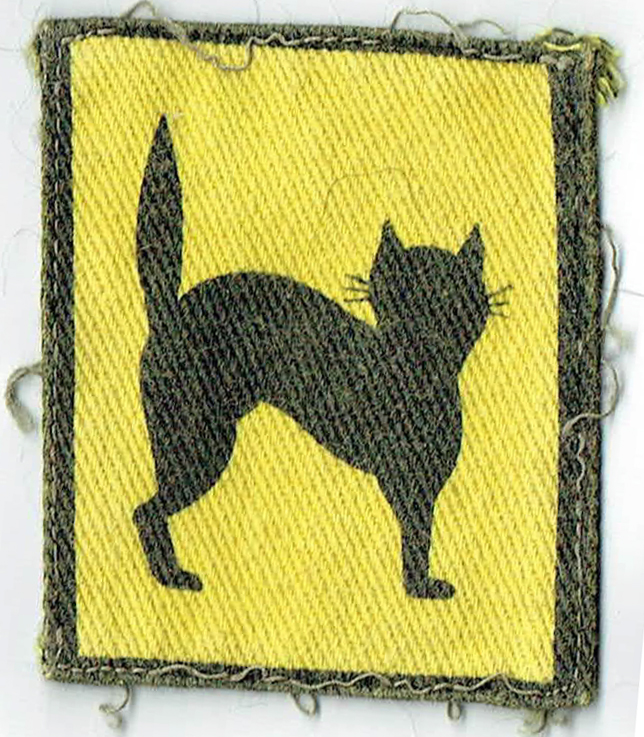
17th Indian Infantry Division

19th Indian Infantry Division

20th Indian Infantry Division

21st Indian Infantry Division

23rd Indian Infantry Division

25th Indian Infantry Division

26th Indian Infantry Division

31st Indian Armoured Division

36th Indian Division

39th Indian Infantry Division

44th Indian Airborne Division

11th (African) Division

12th (African) Division

11th (East Africa) Division
First pattern.

11th (East Africa) Division, second pattern.

81st (West Africa) Division

82nd (West Africa) Division

=== Commonwealth ===
Commonwealth and Dominion forces were exempt from the order banning formation marks on uniform issued in May 1940. The Canadians reused the formation signs of the First World War without the brigade and battalion distinguishing marks. The home service division's signs (6th, 7th and 8th) were made using combinations of the service division's colours. The vehicles of the divisions added a gold coloured maple leaf centrally to the coloured oblong. The Division intended to invade Japan, the 6th Canadian Division (CAPF), used all the division colours and the black of the armoured brigades, volunteers for this division sewed a miniature of this sign on top of whichever formation sign they were wearing at the time.

South African division signs used the national colours.

The Australian militia used the inherited colour patches used in the First World War, the units of the Second Australian Imperial Force (A.I.F.) added a grey border to the patch for those troops reusing the same colours and introduced new division shapes for the armoured divisions. The grey border was allowed to be worn by individuals in a militia unit who had volunteered for an A.I.F unit, or in the case of a soldier who had served overseas, they wore a miniature grey bordered patch of their A.I.F. unit above their militia patch. Units or individuals from the militia, retaining their non-overseas service status, joining A.I.F. units or formations for which the patch was manufactured with a grey border, removed or trimmed the border back. The system, initially for identifying militia and A.I.F units, to one identifying individuals, caused some confusion. All Australian divisions had distinct vehicle markings in addition to the signs worn on the uniform shown below. The uniform signs shown below were worn by division headquarters personnel.

The New Zealand Division used a system of colour patches to distinguish its various units, the sign below is the vehicle sign.

1st Canadian Infantry Division

2nd Canadian Infantry Division

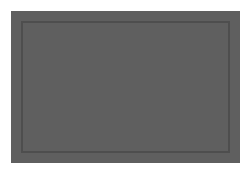
3rd Canadian Infantry Division

4th Canadian Armoured Division

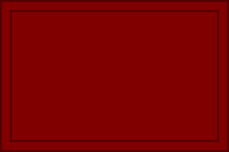
5th Canadian Armoured Division

6th Canadian Division (CAPF)

6th Canadian Infantry Division

7th Canadian Infantry Division

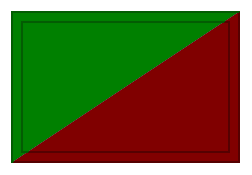
8th Canadian Infantry Division

1st Infantry Division (South Africa)

2nd Infantry Division (South Africa)

3rd Infantry Division (South Africa)

6th Armoured Division (South Africa)

1st Armoured Division (Australia)

2nd Armoured Division (Australia)
Vehicle sign.

2nd Armoured Division (Australia)
uniform pacth (HQ).

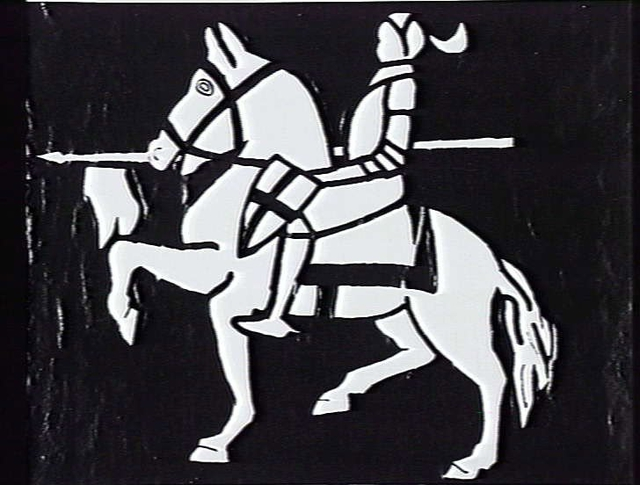
3rd Armoured Division (Australia)
Vehicle sign.

3rd Armoured Division (Australia)
Uniform patch (HQ).

1st Australian Division (Militia)

2nd Australian Division (Militia)
Vehicle sign.

2nd Australian Division (Militia)
Uniform patch (HQ)

3rd Australian Division (Militia)

4th Australian Division (Militia)

5th Australian Division (Militia)

6th Australian Infantry Division

7th Australian Infantry Division

8th Australian Infantry Division

9th Australian Infantry Division
First pattern

9th Australian Infantry Division
Second pattern after Tobruk.

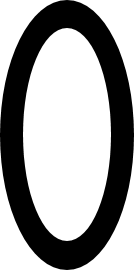
10th Australian Infantry Division
probably never worn.

11th Australian Infantry Division
The shape was worn only by division HQ staff.

2nd New Zealand Division

=== Anti-Aircraft ===
All Anti-Aircraft divisions were disbanded on 1 October 1942, the component units then displayed the Anti-Aircraft Command sign.

1st Anti-Aircraft Division

2nd Anti-Aircraft Division

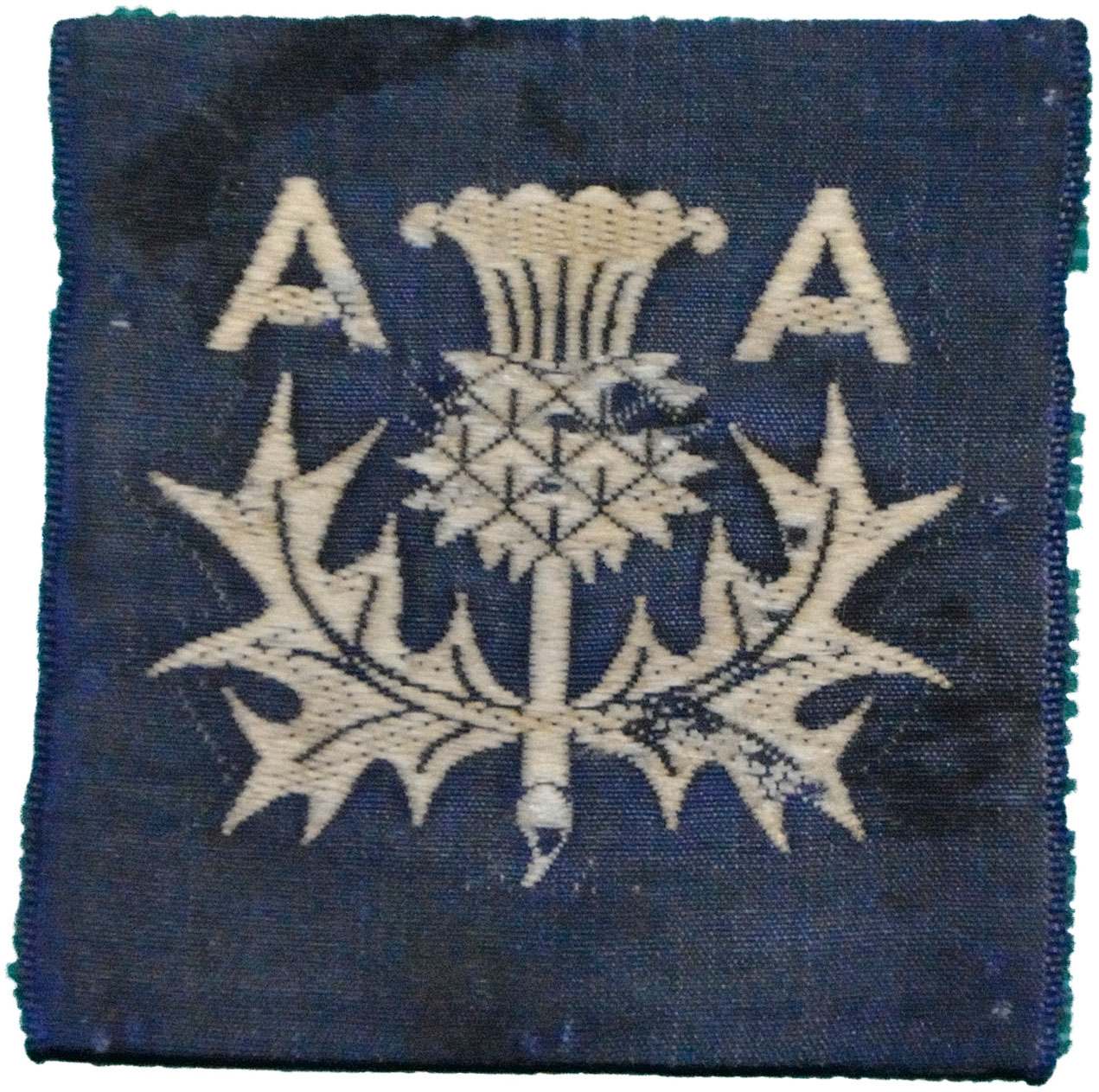
3rd Anti-Aircraft Division

4th Anti-Aircraft Division
First pattern.

4th Anti-Aircraft Division.
Second pattern.

5th Anti-Aircraft Division

6th Anti-Aircraft Division

7th Anti-Aircraft Division

8th Anti-Aircraft Division

9th Anti-Aircraft Division

10th Anti-Aircraft Division

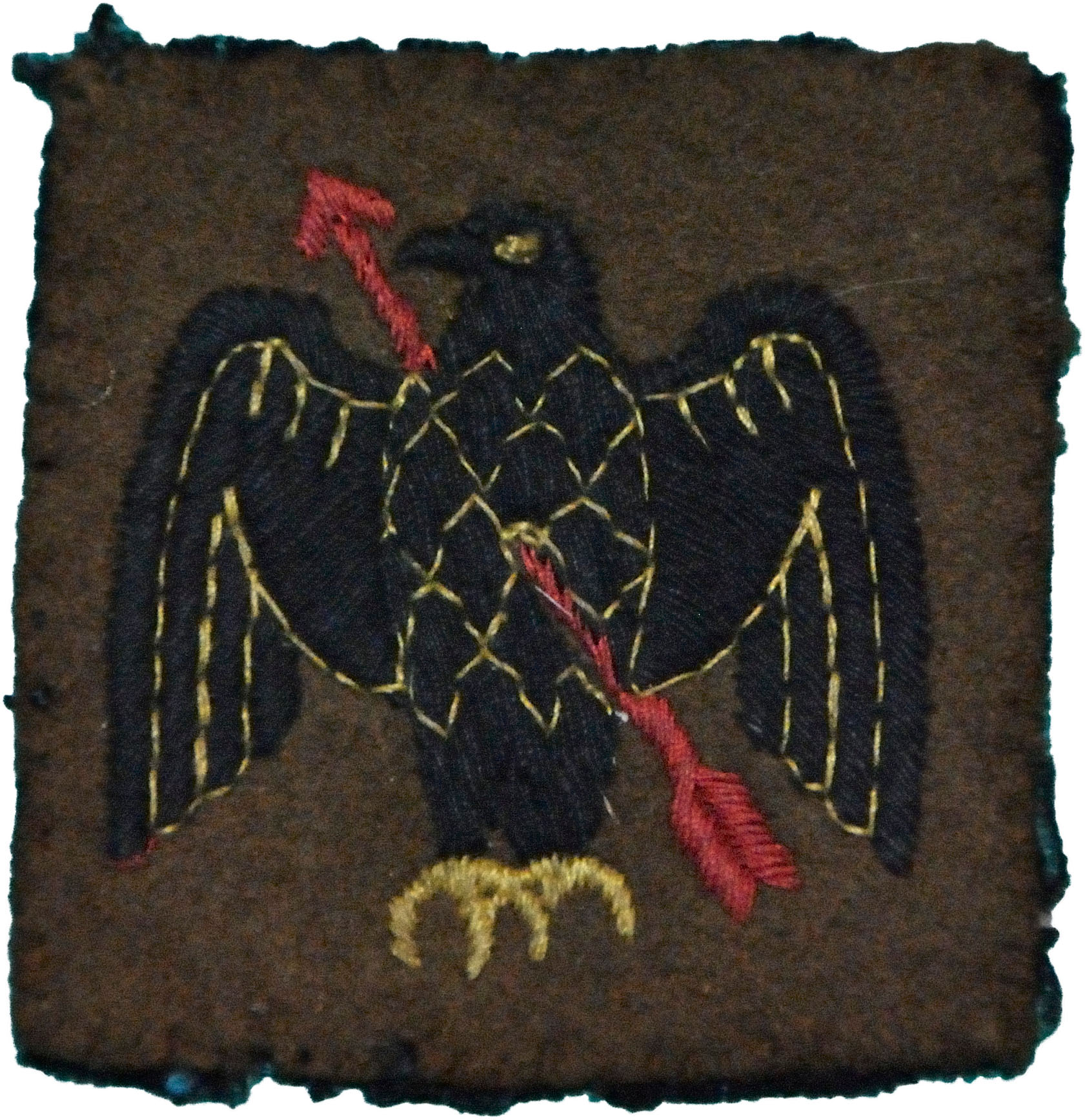
11th Anti-Aircraft Division

12th Anti-Aircraft Division

=== County ===
County divisions were infantry only formations charged with anti-invasion duties, formed in late 1940 to early 1941 and all disbanded before the end of 1941. All but the Devon and Cornwall Division are marked (albeit with question marks) on a German map of May 1944, detailing the German appreciation of the allied build up for the invasion.

Devon and Cornwall County Division

Dorset County Division

Durham and North Riding County Division

Essex County Division

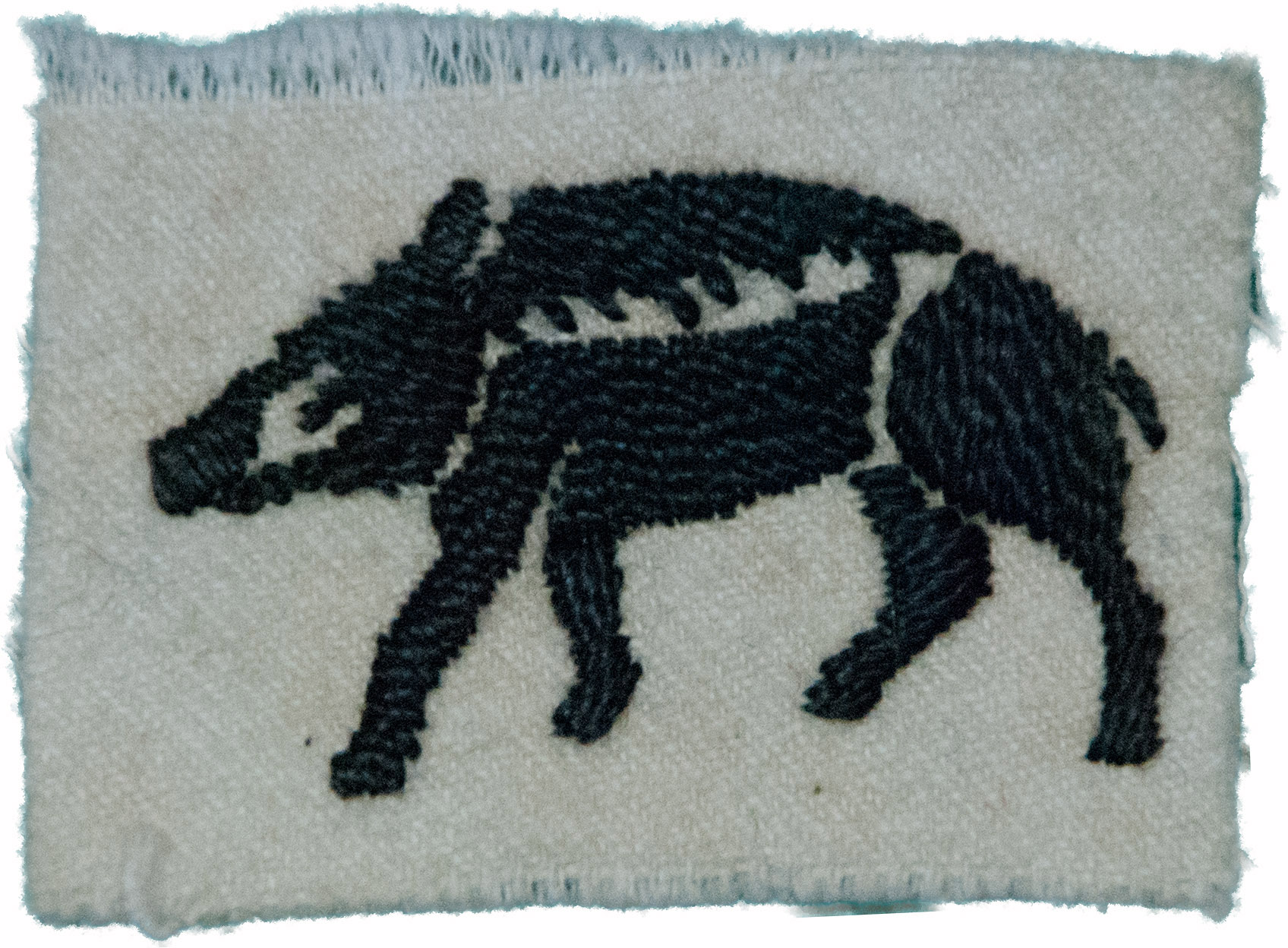
Hampshire County Division

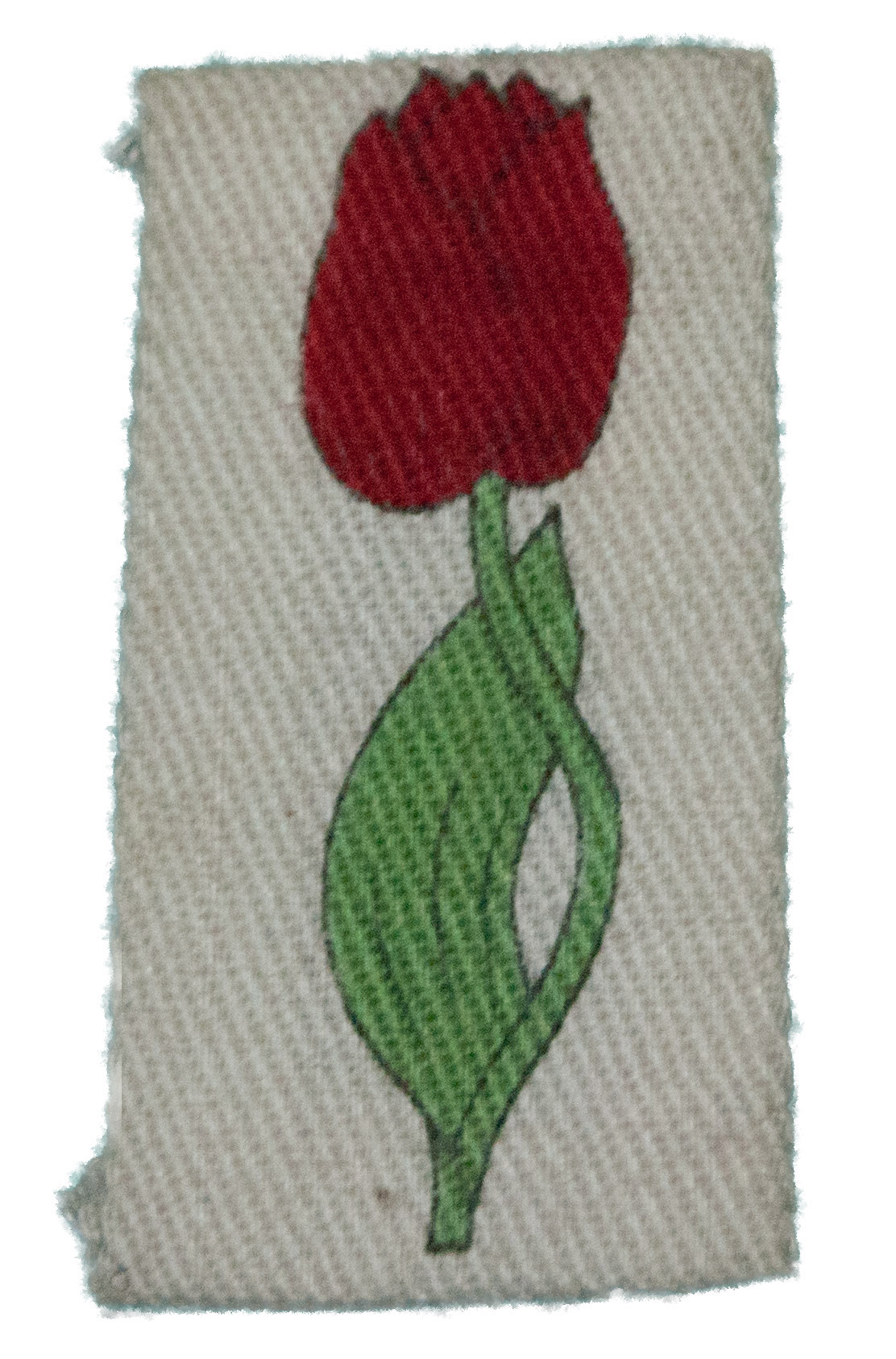
Lincolnshire County Division

Northumberland County Division

West Sussex County Division
Redesignated as the Essex County Division on 18 February 1941.

Yorkshire County Division

=== Deception ===
The formation signs intended to deceive the Axis forces were either worn by small units in the appropriate theatre (40th and 57th divisions in the Mediterranean) or described to the German intelligence services by turned agents.

15th Armoured Division (deception)

20th Armoured Division (deception)

26th Armoured Division (deception)

32nd Infantry Division (deception)

33rd Infantry Division (deception)

34th infantry Division (deception)

40th Infantry Division (deception)

57th Infantry Division (deception)

== Post War ==
=== Infantry ===
1st Infantry Division
(first pattern)

1st Division
(second pattern)

2nd Infantry Division

3rd Infantry Division

4th Division

5th Division

13th Infantry Division
Greece, late 1945 - 1946.

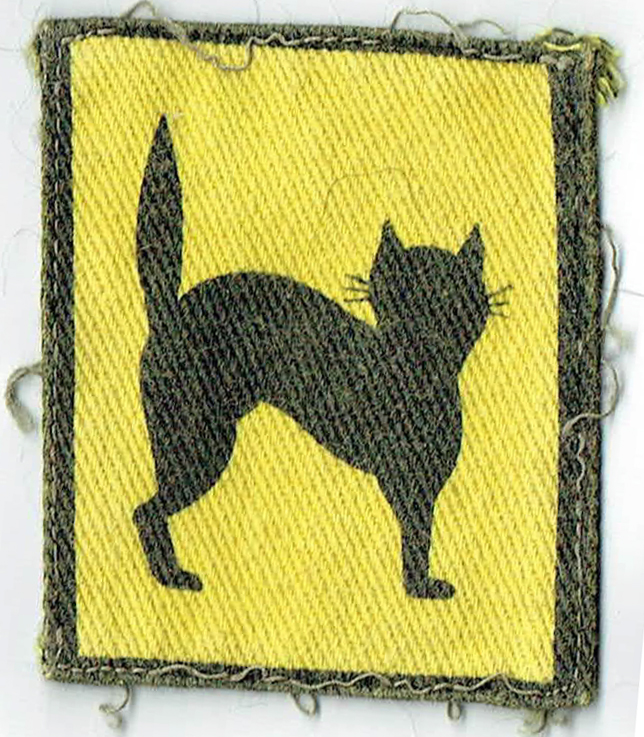
17th Gurkha Division

40th Division

42nd (Lancashire) Division

43rd (Wessex) Infantry Division

44th (Home Counties) Division

50th (Northumbrian) Division

51st (Highland) Division

52nd (Lowland) Division

53rd (Welsh) Division

56th (London) Division
From 1950

=== Armoured ===
6th Armoured Division
From 1950

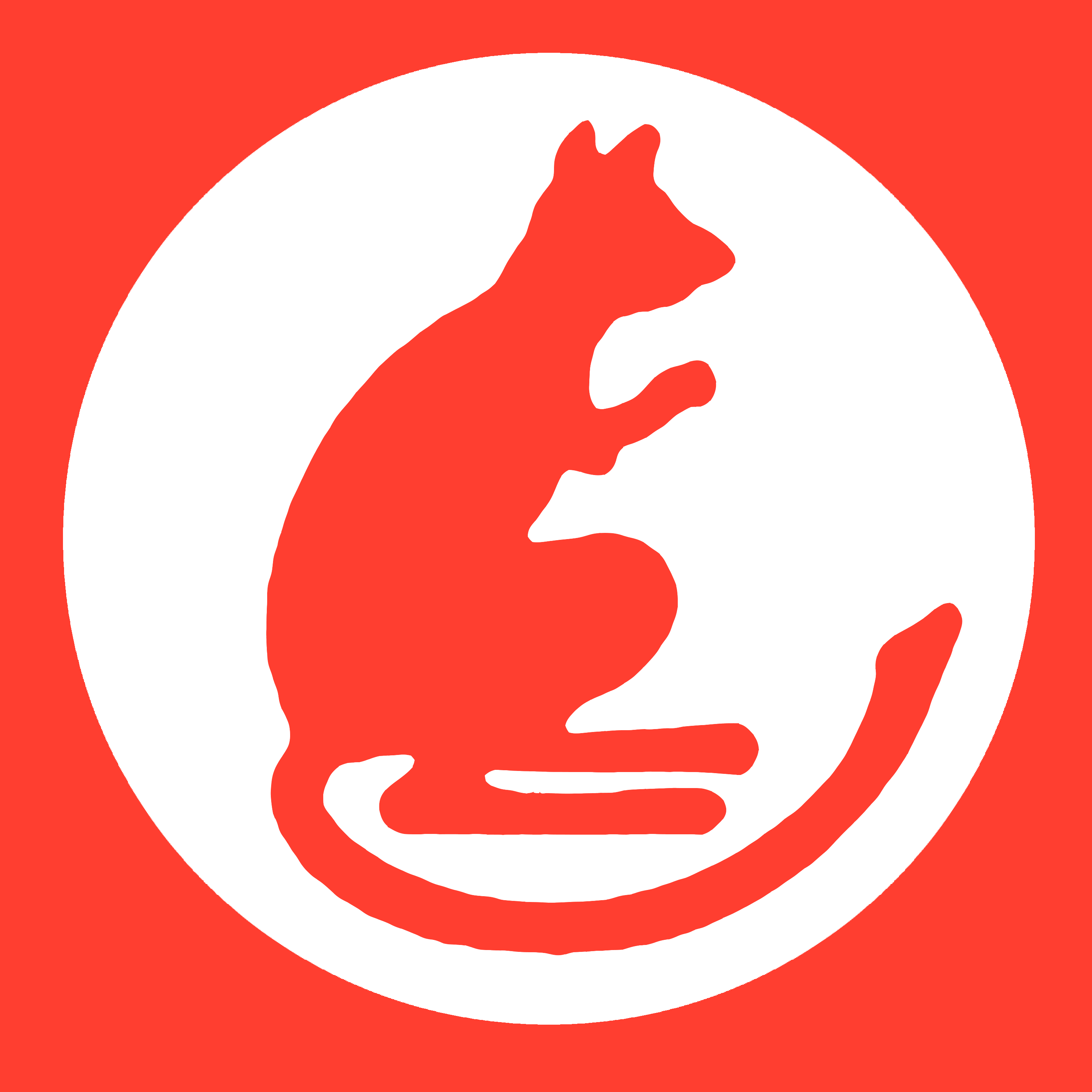
7th Armoured Division
Vehicle sign.

7th Armoured Division, uniform patch.

11th Armoured Division

49th (West Riding and Midlands) Armoured Division

56th (London) Armoured Division

== 1990 and beyond ==
This era is taken to be after the end of the Cold War and the implementation of Options for Change.

2nd Infantry Division

3rd (United Kingdom) Division

5th Infantry Division

6th (United Kingdom) Division

== Bibliography ==
- Cole, Howard (1973). Formation Badges of World War 2. Britain, Commonwealth and Empire. London: Arms and Armour Press. ISBN 978-0-85368-078-9.
- Cole, Howard N. (1953). Badges on Battledress, Post-War Formation Signs; Rank and Regimental Insignia. Aldershot: Gale and Polden. OCLC 6320925.
- Chappell, Mike (1986). British Battle Insignia: 1914–18. Vol. I. Oxford: Osprey. ISBN 978-0-85045-727-8.
- Chappell, Mike (1987). British Battle Insignia: 1939–45. Vol. II. Oxford: Osprey. ISBN 978-0-85045-739-1.
- Davis, Brian L. (1983). British Army Uniforms & Insignia of World War Two. London: Arms and Armour Press. ISBN 978-0-85368-609-5.
- Glynde, Keith (1999). Distinguishing Colour Patches of the Australian Military Forces 1915–1951: A Reference Guide. ISBN 978-0-646-36640-1.
- Hibbard, Mike; Gibbs, Gary (2016). Infantry Divisions, Identification Schemes 1917 (1st ed.). Wokingham: The Military History Society. OCLC 964700810.
- Hodges, Lt. Col. Robin (2005). British Army Badges. London: Butler and Tanner. ISBN 978-0-9551463-0-5.
- Jonstone, Mark (2007). The Australian Army in World War II. Oxford: Osprey. ISBN 978-1-84603-123-6.
- Joslen, H. F. (2003) [1960]. Orders of Battle: Second World War, 1939–1945. Uckfield, East Sussex: Naval and Military Press. ISBN 978-1-84342-474-1.
- MacIntyre, Ben (2012). Double Cross: The True Story of the D-Day Spies. London: Bloomsbury. ISBN 978-1-4088-8541-3.
- Wheeler-Holohan, V. (1920). Divisional and Other Signs. London: John Murray. OCLC 6477100.
- Cigarette card series, Army, Corps and Divisional Signs 1914–1918, John Player and sons, 1920s.
