= John Priestman (British Army officer) =

Major-General John Priestman CB CBE DSO MC
- Born: 22 July 1885
- Died: 22 February 1964 (aged 78); Hertford, Hertfordshire, England
- Military career
- Allegiance: United Kingdom
- Branch: British Army
- Service years: 1904–1941
- Rank: Major-General
- Service number: 1351
- Units: Manchester Regiment; Lincolnshire Regiment
- Commands: Essex County Division (1941); 54th (East Anglian) Infantry Division (1938–1941); 13th Infantry Brigade (1934–1938)
- Conflicts: First World War; Arab revolt in Palestine; Second World War
- Awards: Companion of the Order of the Bath; Commander of the Order of the British Empire; Distinguished Service Order; Military Cross; Mentioned in Despatches (3); Croix de guerre (France)

Major-General John Hedley Thornton Priestman, CB, CBE, DSO, MC (22 July 1885 – 22 February 1964) was a senior officer in the British Army.

== Early life and family ==
John Hedley Thornton Priestman was born on 22 July 1885, the son of J. Priestman of East Mount, Holderness. In 1915, he married Hilda Louise (died 1958), daughter of J. H. Corner of Esk Hall in Sleights. They had two children, one son and one daughter; the son, John Reeve Thornton, was killed in action in North Africa in 1943, while commissioned as a lieutenant in the Army.

== Military career ==
Priestman was commissioned into a part-time unit, the 6th (6th Royal Lancashire Militia) Battalion, Manchester Regiment, on 12 March 1904 before he passed his examinations and was commissioned into the Lincolnshire Regiment (later the Royal Lincolnshire Regiment) as a second lieutenant on 29 November 1905. He was promoted to a lieutenant on 8 October 1910 and served as an adjutant between November of that year and November 1913. He became a captain on 4 August 1914, an acting major on 11 September 1916, a brevet major on New Years Day 1919 and major on 5 June 1923.

Priestman served in the First World War, and was wounded on duty. Mentioned in Despatches three times during the war, he received the French Croix de guerre, the Distinguished Service Order in 1917, and the Military Cross. He served as Officer of a Company of Gentleman Cadets at the Royal Military College, Sandhurst from July 1914 to February 1916; that April, he was posted as a Staff Captain in France for two months, before succeeding Brevet Major Harold Franklyn as a brigade major from June until September. He returned to his previous post until January 1917, when he was again made a brigade major, this time serving until 20 July 1917. The following day, Priestman became a General staff Officer of the 2nd Division in France.

The war ended on 11 November 1918 due to the Armistice with Germany. From April 1919, Priestman was Commander of a Company of Gentleman Cadets at the Royal Military College and a General Staff Officer. Transferred to Aldershot as a GSO in 1922, he relinquished his post there in May 1924, after having attended the Staff College, Camberley from 1921 to 1922. The following November, he became DAAG Western Command but relinquished that position in January 1928. He was promoted to brevet lieutenant colonel in the meantime (28 June 1924). He attended the Imperial Defence College in 1929.

April 1932 saw Priestman appointed to be GSOA at the War Office. On 21 December 1934, he transferred to command the 13th Brigade in Northern Command, serving in Egypt, Palestine and Trans-Jordan as a temporary brigadier between 15 December 1934 and 13 September 1938, including during the Arab revolt in Palestine. His brigade major from December 1936 onwards was Manley James, a Victoria Cross recipient. He was promoted to the rank of major general on 27 December 1937, became an Aide-de-Camp to the King on 17 November 1937, serving for 10 months, and Colonel of the Lincolnshire Regiment on 3 June 1938. After relinquishing his appointment in the Middle East, he returned to the United Kingdom and became General Officer Commanding (GOC) of the 54th (East Anglian) Infantry Division in September 1938 and GOC of the Essex County Division in February 1941 before retiring October 1941.

Priestman was appointed a Commander of the Order of the British Empire in 1938 and a Companion of the Order of the Bath in 1939. He retired in 1941 and died on 22 February 1964 at his home in Hertford.

== Bibliography ==
- Smart, Nick (2005). Biographical Dictionary of British Generals of the Second World War. Barnesley: Pen & Sword. ISBN 1844150496.

Military offices
Preceded by Russell Luckcock	GOC 54th (East Anglian) Infantry Division; 1938–1941	Succeeded by Evelyn Barker
