= 201st Independent Infantry Brigade (Home) =

- Active: 4 October 1940 – 13 December 1941
- Country: United Kingdom
- Branch: British Army
- Type: Infantry
- Role: Home Defence
- Size: Brigade

Insignia
- Badge worn when in the Yorkshire County Division

The 201st Independent Infantry Brigade (Home) was a short-lived Home Defence formation of the British Army during the Second World War.

== Formation and Service ==
The 201st Independent Infantry Brigade was formed for service in the United Kingdom on 4 October 1940 by No 1 Infantry Training Group in Aldershot Command. It was commanded by Brigadier A.E. Lawrence, and comprised four newly raised infantry battalions from Southern England. 'Home' brigades had a purely static defence role.

== Service ==
The brigade moved from Aldershot Command to XII Corps on 10 October and then briefly to the West Sussex County Division (on 9 November), then to the Yorkshire Area (Military District) (on 21 February 1941), then to the Yorkshire County Division on 19 March, after that was formed on 24 February. The Yorkshire County Division was re-designated the East Riding Coastal Area on 1 December and the brigade went with it until it was disbanded on 13 December.

== Order of battle ==
The composition of 201st Brigade was as follows:

- 13th Battalion, Queen's Royal Regiment (West Surrey) – joined 4 October 1940, left 25 November 1941; later to 211th Bde
- 14th Battalion, Queen's Royal Regiment (West Surrey) – formed 4 July 1940 at Dorchester, Dorset, joined 4 October 1940, left 3 June 1941, converted on 1 December that year into 99th Light Anti-Aircraft Regiment, Royal Artillery
- 9th Battalion, Hampshire Regiment – formed 4 July 1940, joined 4 October 1940, left 5 December 1941 to be converted into 157th Regiment Royal Armoured Corps
- 10th Battalion, Hampshire Regiment – formed 4 July 1940 at Aldershot, joined 4 October 1940, left 25 November 1941 to be converted into 147th Regiment Royal Armoured Corps
