= West Sussex County Division =

- Formation sign of the West Sussex County Division
- Active: 9 November 1940 – 18 February 1941
- Country: United Kingdom
- Branch: British Army
- Type: Static Division
- Role: Home defence

The West Sussex County Division was a formation of the British Army, raised in the Second World War and formed by the redesignation of Brocforce on 9 November 1940. On 18 February 1941, the headquarters was redesignated as the Essex County Division. It was commanded by four officers, Major-General Edwin Morris from formation until 16 December, Brigadier A. E. Lawrence until 29 December, Major-General Sir Oliver Leese until 30 January 1941 and then Brigadier H. J. Parham. It was an infantry only formation consisting of two Independent Infantry Brigades. Usually, combat support, artillery, engineers etc., would be provided by other local formations, exceptionally, for a county division, the 29th Brigade Group commanded additional units.

It was commanded by XII Corps until 15 January 1941 and then by IV Corps.

== Order of Battle ==
Both brigades were part of the division from 9 November 1940 to 17 February 1941.

- 29th Infantry Brigade Group
  - 1st Battalion, Royal Scots Fusiliers
  - 1st Battalion, Royal Welch Fusiliers
  - 2nd Battalion, East Lancashire Regiment
  - 2nd Battalion, South Lancashire Regiment
  - E Company 5th Battalion Argyll and Sutherland Highlanders (Machine guns)
  - 29th Independent Brigade Group Anti-Tank Company
  - 17th Field Regiment Royal Artillery
  - 204th Anti-Tank Battery
  - 236th Field Company Royal Engineers
  - 29th Independent Brigade Group Company R.A.S.C.
  - 154th Field Ambulance R.A.M.C.
  - 29th Independent Brigade Group Provost Section R.M.P

The brigade group transferred to IV Corps after leaving the division.

- 201st Independent Infantry Brigade (Home)
  - 13th Battalion, Queen's Royal Regiment (West Surrey)
  - 14th Battalion, Queen's Royal Regiment (West Surrey)
  - 9th Battalion, Hampshire Regiment
  - 10th Battalion, Hampshire Regiment

The brigade transferred to the Yorkshire County Division after leaving the division.

== See also ==
- List of British divisions in World War II

== Bibliography ==
- Boulanger, Bruno (2015). WW2 British Formation Badges. Collectors Guide (1 ed.). ISBN 9782960180206.
- Joslen, Lt-Col H.F. (1990) [1st. Pub. HMSO:1960]. Orders of Battle, Second World War, 1939–1945. London: London Stamp Exchange. ISBN 0-948130-03-2.
