= Essex County Division =

- Division insignia of the Essex County Division
- Active: 18 February – 7 October 1941
- Country: United Kingdom
- Branch: British Army
- Type: Static Division

The Essex County Division was a short-lived formation of the British Army formed in the Second World War on 18 February 1941 by the redesignation of the West Sussex County Division. It was disbanded on 7 October. It had one commanding officer, Major-General J. H. T. Priestman. It was an infantry only formation consisting of three Independent Infantry Brigades (Home). Combat support, artillery, engineers etc., would be provided by other local formations. It was under the command of XI Corps from formation to 22 July and then under GHQ Home Forces.

== Order of Battle ==
- 207th Independent Home Infantry Brigade
  - 7th Battalion, The King's Own Yorkshire Light Infantry (left 26 August 1941)
  - 9th Battalion, The Duke of Wellington's West Riding Regiment (left 27 August 1941)
  - 10th Battalion, The York and Lancaster Regiment (left 25 August 1941)
  - 13th Battalion, The Sherwood Foresters (left 22 July 1941)

The brigade headquarters remained, without battalions, with the division until its disbanding, then it was redesignated the 207th Independent Infantry Brigade.

- 208th Independent Home Infantry Brigade
  - 7th Battalion, The York and Lancaster Regiment (left 13 October 1941)
  - 10th Battalion, The Lancashire Fusiliers (left 10 October 1941)
  - 13th Battalion, The King's Regiment (left 13 October 1941)
  - 22nd Battalion, The Royal Fusiliers (left 22 July 1941)

The brigade headquarters was disbanded shortly after the division.

- 223rd Independent Home Infantry Brigade
  - 6th Battalion, The Northamptonshire Regiment
  - 8th Battalion, The Suffolk Regiment
  - 10th Battalion, The Essex Regiment

The brigade left the division on 22 July 1941, joining XI Corps.

== See also ==
- List of British divisions in World War II

== Bibliography ==
- Cole, Howard (1973). Formation Badges of World War 2 Britain, Commonwealth and Empire. London: Arms and Armour Press.
- Joslen, Lt-Col H.F. (1990) [1st. Pub. HMSO:1960]. Orders of Battle, Second World War, 1939–1945. London: London Stamp Exchange. ISBN 0-948130-03-2.
