= 208th Independent Infantry Brigade (Home) =

- Active: 6 October 1940 – 17 October 1941
- Country: United Kingdom
- Branch: British Army
- Type: Infantry Brigade
- Role: Home Defence

The 208th Independent Infantry Brigade (Home) was a short-lived Home Defence formation of the British Army during the Second World War.

== Origin ==
The brigade was formed for service in the United Kingdom on 6 October 1940, by No 8 Infantry Training Group in Scottish Command. It was commanded by Brigadier R.N. Stewart and composed of newly raised infantry battalions.

== Service ==
During its service the brigade came under the administrative control of several higher formations: 55th (West Lancashire) Infantry Division (16 October–6 November 1940), 42nd (East Lancashire) Infantry Division (6 November 1940 – 20 February 1941), and then became an integral part of Essex County Division from its formation until disbandment on 7 October 1941.

The brigade remained in the United Kingdom throughout its service and was itself disbanded on 17 October 1941.

== Order of battle ==
The composition of 208th Brigade was as follows:

- 13th Battalion, King's Regiment (Liverpool) (6 October 1940 – 13 October 1941)
- 9th Battalion, Lancashire Fusiliers (6–30 October 1940)
- 10th Battalion, Lancashire Fusiliers (18 October 1940 – 14 October 1941)
- 22nd Battalion, Royal Fusiliers (18 October 1940 – 22 July 1941, converted in February 1942 to the 94th Anti-Tank Regiment, Royal Artillery)
- 7th Battalion, York and Lancaster Regiment (17 December 1940 – 13 October 1941)
