= Yorkshire County Division =

- Formation sign of the Yorkshire County Division.
- Active: 24 February 1941 – 1 December 1941
- Country: United Kingdom
- Branch: British Army
- Type: Static Division
- Role: Home Defence

The Yorkshire County Division was a formation of the British Army in the Second World War, its headquarters were formed on 24 February 1941, and became operation on 19 March. It was commanded by three officers, Major-General the Hon E. F. Lawson until 11 September, Brigadier G. H. Gotto until 23 September, Major-General E. C. Hayes until 20 November and then Gotto again. It was an infantry only formation consisting of three Independent Infantry Brigades (Home). Combat support, artillery, engineers etc., would be provided by other local formations. It was directly under Northern Command until 9 March and then came under I Corps. The Headquarters was redesignated the East Riding District on 1 December 1941.

== Order of Battle ==
All brigades were part of the division from 19 March to 30 November 1941.

201st Independent Infantry Brigade (Home) Formed from No. 1 Infantry Training Group.

- 13th Battalion, Queen's Royal Regiment (West Surrey) (left 25 November 1941)
- 14th Battalion, Queen's Royal Regiment (West Surrey) (left 3 June 1941)
- 9th Battalion, Hampshire Regiment
- 10th Battalion, Hampshire Regiment (left 25 November 1941)

The brigade disbanded in mid December.

218th Independent Infantry Brigade (Home)

- 8th Battalion, King's Own Yorkshire Light Infantry (left 6 November 1941)
- 11th Battalion, York and Lancaster Regiment
- 10th Battalion, Duke of Wellington's Regiment
- 6th Battalion, King's Own Royal Regiment (Lancaster) (left 23 May 1941)

The brigade was redesignated the 218th Independent Infantry Brigade in late December.

221st Independent Infantry Brigade (Home)

- 11th Battalion, Gloucestershire Regiment
- 10th Battalion, Royal West Kent Regiment
- 7th Battalion, King's Shropshire Light Infantry (left 29 November 1941)

The brigade disbanded in late December.

== See also ==
- List of British divisions in World War II

== Bibliography ==
- Cole, Howard (1973). Formation Badges of World War 2 Britain, Commonwealth and Empire. London: Arms and Armour Press.
- Joslen, Lt-Col H.F. (1990) [1st. Pub. HMSO:1960]. Orders of Battle, Second World War, 1939–1945. London: London Stamp Exchange. ISBN 0-948130-03-2.
