= List of British brigades of the Second World War =

This is a list of British Brigades in the Second World War. It is intended as a central place to access resources about formations of brigade size that served in the British Army during the Second World War.

- List of British airborne brigades of the Second World War (includes airlanding and parachute brigades)
- List of British anti-aircraft brigades of the Second World War
- List of British infantry brigades of the Second World War (1–100)
- List of British infantry brigades of the Second World War (101–308 and named)
- List of British mobile brigades during the Second World War (includes armoured, cavalry, armoured reconnaissance, motor machine gun, support groups, and tank brigades)
- List of British special service brigades of the Second World War

== See also ==
- British Army during the Second World War
- British deception formations in World War II
- British infantry brigades of the First World War
- Military history of Britain during World War II
