= 306th Brigade =

306th Brigade may refer to:

- 306th Brigade, Royal Field Artillery, United Kingdom
- 306th Infantry Brigade, United Kingdom

== See also ==
- 306th Regiment (disambiguation)
