= List of British mobile brigades during the Second World War =

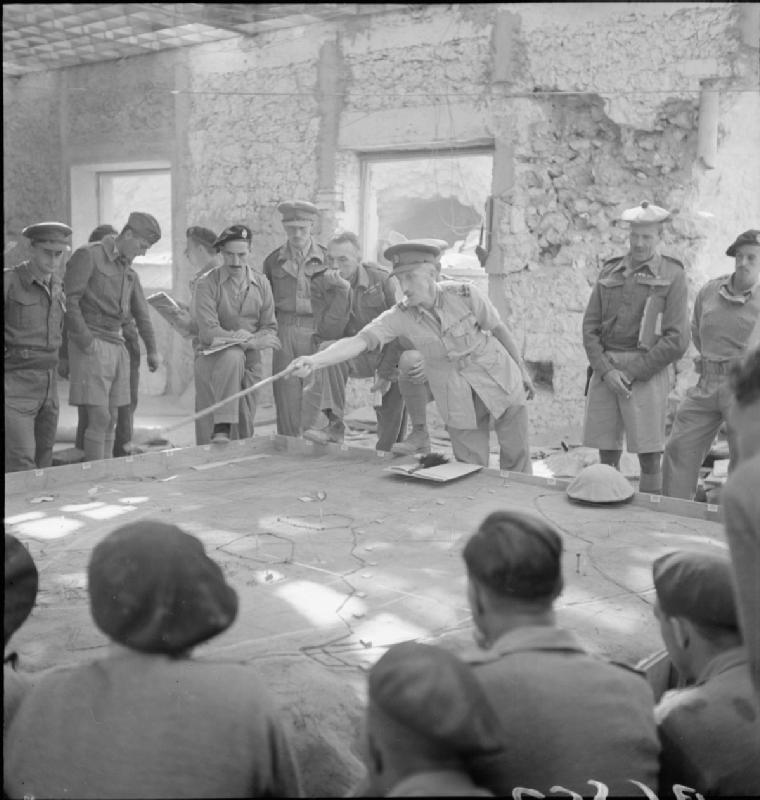
During the Second World War, British brigades were commanded by a brigadier. Here Brigadier A. C. Willison, the commander of the 32nd Army Tank Brigade, instructs tank crews on an upcoming battle plan during the Siege of Tobruk, November 1941.

During the Second World War, the British Army maintained and created several mechanised, motorised, and horse-based brigades that were not infantry-based. (Note: During the Second World War, the British infantry were completely motorised.) These mobile forces consisted of battalions and regiments, and were under the command of a brigadier. Brigades could be assigned to a division or operate as an independent formation assigned to a corps headquarters or higher. At the start of the war, in September 1939, the British Army had seven armoured brigades, five tank brigades and one support group (a mixed arms formation assigned to armoured divisions). Numerous armoured and tank brigades were raised, renamed, and disbanded during the war. The army also formed eight support groups, three brigades of cavalry, three brigades equipped with armoured cars and two brigades aimed at grouping divisional cavalry regiments.

The nomenclature of the units assigned to brigades varied at the start of the war. The armoured brigade was the primary force within an armoured division. It was to consist of regiments of fast moving cruiser tanks, prepared to exploit gaps in an opponent's front line and also assigned to engage and destroy opposing armoured forces. These brigades also had an integrated battalion of motorised infantry. Tank brigades, with no integrated infantry support, were to consist of battalions of heavily armoured infantry tanks that would support infantry divisions and for breakthrough operations. However, brigades could be outfitted with whatever was available. In May 1940, nomenclature was standardised in the Royal Armoured Corps and battalion titles were dropped, all units becoming regiments. Starting in 1942, armoured brigades were increasingly equipped with American-supplied medium tanks instead of cruisers. In 1945, all tank brigades were renamed armoured brigades, removing the distinction between titles.

== Background ==
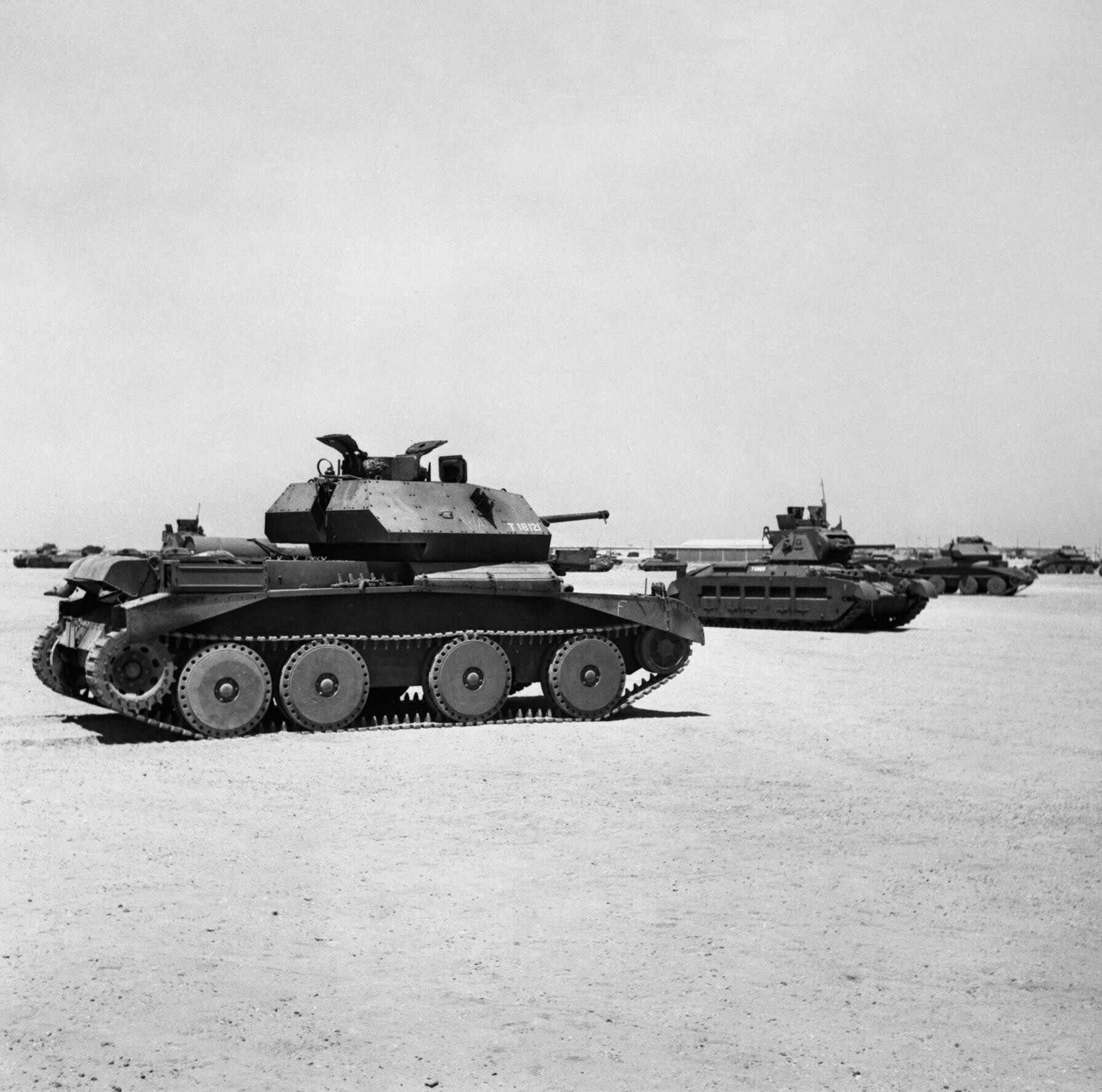
Cruiser Mark IV tank (foreground) and Matilda II infantry tank (background)

By the 1930s, the British Army had identified four required tank types: the light, the medium, the cruiser, and the infantry tank. Each would be utilised in a particular and separate role from the others. Because of research and development issues, the medium tank concept was dropped and subsumed by the work that proceeded on cruiser tanks. This distinction between tanks and their roles shaped how brigades were named and what their function would be. The armoured brigade was to be equipped with cruiser tanks, while the tank brigade would be equipped with infantry tanks. Irrespective of the different roles, all brigades were commanded by a brigadier.

British tank doctrine stated that infantry tank-equipped brigades would support infantry divisions in penetrating the enemy's defensive line. Cruiser tank-equipped brigades would exploit any gap created. Light tanks were intended for reconnaissance work. In the 1930s, the active British models were only equipped with machine guns. The cruiser was to be more heavily armoured in comparison (but not so armoured that it would be detrimental to its speed), faster, and equipped with machine guns and an anti-tank gun. In addition to being used to exploit holes in the enemy line, the doctrine called for the cruiser to engage and destroy opposing armoured forces. The infantry tank was to be the most heavily armoured of the three categories. It was slower, and was intended to work alongside infantry forces.

At the beginning of the Second World War, in 1939, regiments of mechanised cavalry were intended to be assigned to the armoured brigades and equipped with cruisers. The battalions of the Royal Tank Regiment were intended to be assigned to tank brigades, and would be equipped with infantry tanks. In May 1940, the Royal Armoured Corps (the parent organisation that administered all armoured units) standardised the nomenclature around the 'cavalry' tradition. Thereafter, the term battalion was dropped, and the Royal Tank Regiment units were known only as regiments. A brigade would generally be assigned three battalions or regiments. In 1945, an additional standardisation move took place, eliminating the armour and tank brigade difference with the latter being redesignated as armoured brigades.

Real-life conditions did not follow the ideal practice laid out above. For example, cavalry and Royal Tank Regiment units were assigned to the 1st Armoured Brigade in 1940. They were equipped with a mix of cruisers and light tanks. In 1941, elements of the 3rd Armoured Brigade were equipped with captured Italian M13/40 medium tanks because of the lack of available British models. After the implementation of lend-Lease, American tanks arrived. This resulted in the 4th Armoured Brigade being outfitted with the American M3 Stuart light tanks, which were equipped with a machine gun and an anti-tank cannon. During 1942, the 23rd Armoured Brigade was equipped with Valentine infantry tanks, while the 9th Armoured Brigade was outfitted with a mix of cruiser and American medium tanks.

In 1943, United States Lieutenant General Brehon B. Somervell, head of the Army Service Forces that oversaw the US logistical efforts and lend lease shipments, argued for the United Kingdom to cease domestic tank production and rely solely on American. Somervell reasoned that British tanks were inferior to the M4 Sherman medium tank, and that this would free up British factory space particularly for trucks, machinery, and trains (as British demands for these items via lend-lease had increased). British tank production was reduced, but domestic construction was maintained. By mid-1944, the majority of armoured brigades were equipped with the Sherman, as a result of British cruiser production being unable to meet the numbers required of the Royal Armoured Corps. The lack of quality and reliability, among the British designs, was also a factor in the increased use of American models. Of the nine British armoured brigades deployed to France, in 1944 as part of the Northwest Europe campaign, only the 22nd Armoured Brigade, of the 7th Armoured Division, was primarily equipped with British tanks (the new Cromwell). The number of brigades equipped with British tanks, in northwest Europe, doubled over the winter of 1944/45. In October 1944, the 29th Armoured Brigade, of the 11th Armoured Division, was selected to be re-equipped with the new British Comet tank. The process was started in December, but delayed through to January 1945 as a result of the Battle of the Bulge.

Simultaneously, in September and October, the US reduced the number of medium tanks that were to be delivered to the British Army. By December, as a result of decreased US tank production along with an increased need for medium tanks due to losses, the US suspended tank deliveries. The US Army, which lacking substantial reserves of Sherman tanks in Europe, had to obtain them from the extensive reserve that the British Army had accumulated. To build-up an adequate ongoing reserve for the US Army, the majority of Sherman tanks that were to be delivered to the British Army in 1945 were reallocated. The British had requested 4,000 Shermans and 1,150 of the new M26 Pershings. As a result of the shift in the American priority to build-up its own forces, this rendered the British order meaningless. Token deliveries of Sherman tanks were made, but 1945 saw the British realisation that they could no longer count on abundant American tank deliveries in order to maintain their own armoured forces.

== Armoured ==
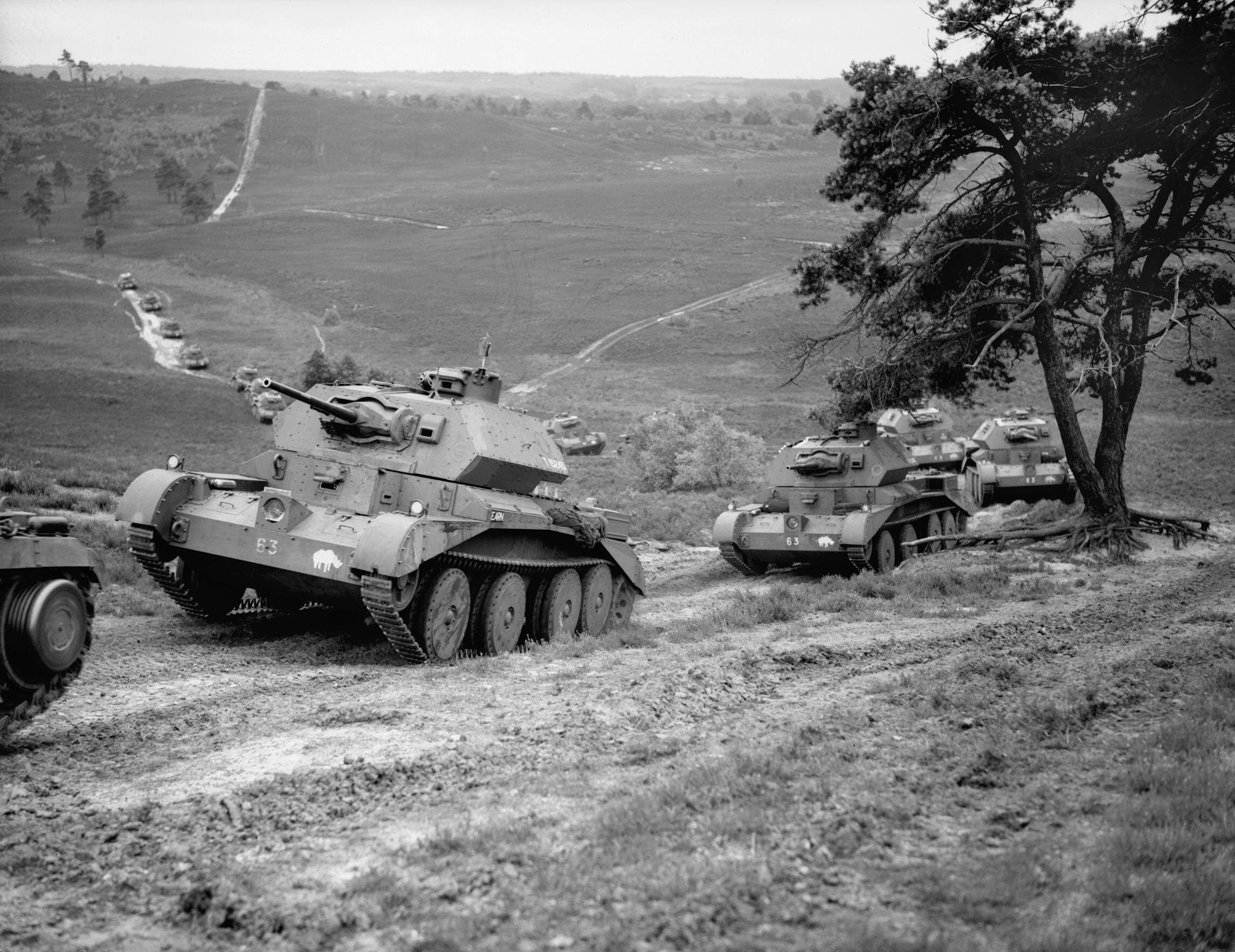
Elements of the 3rd Armoured Brigade, equipped with Cruiser IVs, on the move.

The armoured brigade was the primary formation within an armoured division. At the start of the Second World War, an armoured division was to consist of two armoured brigades: a heavy and a light. The war establishment called for the former to be equipped with 147 'heavy cruisers', such as the Cruiser Mk II and the Cruiser Mk III. The light brigade was to be 174 tanks strong and consist of a mix of light tanks and 'light cruiser' tanks such as the Cruiser Mk I. A further 20 tanks were to be assigned to the brigade headquarters. In April 1940, the light and heavy distinctions were dropped, and each brigade was to be equipped with three armoured regiments, each consisting of 52 tanks. In practice, however, brigades were equipped with what was available. In 1940, for example, the two brigades of the 2nd Armoured Division were equipped with a total of 256 light tanks and 54 cruisers. From October 1940 onwards, each armoured brigade was to include an integrated battalion of motorised infantry. For the brigades assigned to an armoured division, these battalions were to be assigned from the division's support groups that contained the infantry and supporting arms. Implementation of this change was not universal. For example, the 2nd Armoured Division's 1st Armoured Brigade received an infantry battalion in February 1941, whereas the division's 3rd Armoured Brigade did not receive one at all. Likewise, the 7th Armoured Division's 4th Armoured Brigade did not receive integrated infantry support until February 1942, while its 7th Armoured Brigade received an infantry battalion in April 1941. The majority of brigades formed after October 1940, however, included the required infantry battalion from the date of their creation.

As the war progressed, the war establishment diverged for those brigades based in the United Kingdom compared to those engaged in the Western Desert campaign in North Africa. By 1942, the armoured divisions in North Africa were to consist of one armoured brigade that had been reorganised as a brigade group; a formation that contained its own supporting arms, such as engineers and artillery. The arrival of American tanks in Egypt also resulted in an equipment difference. British-based brigades consisted of only cruisers, while those in Egypt were equipped with a mix of cruisers and American light and medium tanks. By the middle of 1942, the brigade group concept had been abandoned. The supporting arms were removed from the brigades and returned to being divisional assets. Each brigade, in the Middle East, was then to consist of three regiments of 52 tanks. The brigade headquarters was also assigned eight additional tanks, and the brigade was to include four tanks equipped with anti-aircraft guns. In 1943, the divisional armoured brigades were standardised for those abroad and those based in the United Kingdom. Each brigade was to have three regiments of 55 cruisers/medium tanks, six tanks equipped with howitzers capable of firing smoke and high explosive rounds in a close support role, eight anti-aircraft tanks, and ten tanks assigned to the brigade headquarters. From March 1944, the brigade was allocated 33 light tanks for reconnaissance, and eight tanks outfitted as artillery observation posts. In 1945, the brigade headquarters was reduced to seven tanks.

In addition to the armoured brigades assigned to a division, the British Army utilised several brigades that operated as independent formations. In the early stages of the war, this could range from being assigned to provide armour support to an expeditionary force, such as the 1st Armoured Brigade during the Battle of Greece, to being used for independent tasks such as the 9th Armoured Brigade during the Second Battle of El Alamein. During the Western Desert campaign, the main function of these independent formations was to replace brigades within a division that had suffered heavy losses; to reinforce an armoured division to increase its tank strength temporarily; or to provide tank support to infantry formations by being temporarily assigned to them. These formations were also to be structured the same way as those brigades assigned to armoured divisions. In preparation for the Allied invasion of France in 1944 (Operation Overlord), the British Army intended to prepare eight tank brigades to provide infantry support. These brigades were to be assigned to corps or army level commands, and then allocated to infantry divisions as needed. As tank production could not meet the numbers required, five of these brigades were organised as independent armoured brigades and equipped with M4 Shermans. General Bernard Montgomery, commander of the 21st Army Group to which these brigades were assigned, had advocated for a Universal Tank that combined the aspects of the infantry and cruiser tanks. In the interim, he believed that the M4 Sherman was the closest tool for the universal tank role. He made clear that he saw no distinction between armoured and tank brigades, and would use either as he best decided and not via the previously defined roles that they had been given. The lack of enforced doctrine allowed these armoured brigades to implement infantry support as they saw fit.

In 1943, the 79th Armoured Division was converted to develop specialised tanks for the particular problems of an amphibious landing on the defended French coast. It was deployed to France in June 1944, as part of Operation Overlord, and fielded two armoured brigades. These brigades were equipped with the Churchill infantry tank and M4 Shermans. These tanks had been modified to tackle various obstacles that British forces would face when conducting the Normandy landings, and later fought in subsequent assault operations. These modifications included mine-clearing flails, modified Churchill tanks dubbed Armoured Vehicle Royal Engineers that were equipped with an anti-fortification weapon and could carry fascines or other bridging equipment, and flamethrowers. The units of the brigade would be assigned to formations that needed their assistance, and the brigadier would act as an advisor in their use.

In January 1945, the British Army decided that all remaining tank brigades would be redesignated as armoured brigades, although they retained their infantry tanks and were not necessarily re-equipped with medium or cruiser tanks as the existing armoured brigades were.

List of armoured brigades
Formation name	Existing formation or date created	Date formation ceased to exist	Locations served	Notable campaigns	Notes	Source(s)
1st Armoured Brigade	Existing	21 November 1942	United Kingdom, Egypt, Greece, Italian-Libya	Battle of Greece, Western Desert campaign	At the start of the war, the brigade was called the 1st Light Armoured Brigade. It was redesignated as the 1st Armoured Brigade on 14 April 1940. After the Battle of Greece, the brigade spent the remainder of 1941 as a training formation. On 6 June 1942, it was redesignated the 1st Armoured Brigade (Tank Delivery Troops), and on 4 October 1942 as the 1st Armoured Brigade (Tank Reorganisation Group). The brigade was disbanded in Egypt, on 21 November 1942.	
1st Assault Brigade Royal Engineers	26 November 1943	30 July 1945	United Kingdom, France, Belgium, Netherlands, Germany	Operation Overlord, Allied advance from Paris to the Rhine, Western Allied invasion of Germany	The brigade was formed when Headquarters Engineer Assault Troops were redesignated and was equipped with specialised tanks. It was redesignated the 1st Assault Brigade and Assault Park Squadron Royal Engineers on 10 May 1944, and reverted to its previous title on 17 January 1945. On 23 April, it was redesignated 1st Armoured Engineer Brigade. The brigade was disbanded in Germany on 30 July 1945.	
2nd Armoured Brigade	Existing	N/A	United Kingdom, France, Egypt, Italian-Libya, Tunisia, Italy	Battle of France, Western Desert campaign, Tunisia Campaign, Italian campaign	The brigade started the war titled the 2nd Light Armoured Brigade. It was redesignated as the 2nd Armoured Brigade on 14 April 1940. It suffered heavy losses during the First Battle of El Alamein, and the brigade was reformed in August 1942. The brigade was primarily assigned to the 1st Armoured Division from the start of the war through to September 1944, and was thereafter an independent formation. It ended the war in Italy.	
3rd Armoured Brigade	Existing	11 January 1943	United Kingdom, France, Egypt, Italian-Libya	Western Desert campaign	Called the 1st Heavy Armoured Brigade at the start of the war, it was redesignated as the 3rd Armoured Brigade on 14 April 1940. The brigade was assigned to the 2nd Armoured Division, and was defeated and suffered heavy losses following the first German offensive in North Africa. The remnants of the brigade retreated to Tobruk. Its surviving forces were absorbed by the 32nd Army Tank Brigade on 18 September 1941. Thereafter, it remained listed as an active brigade but had no personnel assigned. It was officially disbanded on 11 January 1943.	
4th Armoured Brigade	Existing	N/A	Egypt, Italian-Libya, Tunisia, Italy, United Kingdom, France, Belgium, Netherlands, Germany	Western Desert campaign, Tunisian campaign, Allied invasion of Sicily, Italian campaign, Operation Overlord, Allied advance from Paris to the Rhine, Western Allied invasion of Germany	The brigade started the war in Egypt called the Heavy Armoured Brigade (Egypt). It was redesignated as the 4th Heavy Armoured Brigade on 16 February 1940, and then the 4th Armoured Brigade on 14 April 1940. On 9 February 1942, it was redesignated as the 4th Armoured Brigade Group, and reverted to its previous title on 6 June 1943. It was one of the original brigades assigned to the 7th Armoured Division, and primarily served with it through to mid-1943. Thereafter, it was an independent brigade assigned to variety of commands, and ended the war in Germany.	
5th Guards Armoured Brigade	15 September 1941	12 June 1945	United Kingdom, France, Belgium, Netherlands, Germany	Operation Overlord, Allied advance from Paris to the Rhine, Operation Market Garden, Western Allied invasion of Germany	The brigade was formed when the 20th Independent Infantry Brigade (Guards) was reorganised and redesignated as an armoured brigade. It was then posted to the Guards Armoured Division for the rest of the war. In Germany, on 12 June 1945, the brigade was reorganised as an infantry formation and was redesignated the 5th Guards Brigade.	
6th Guards Armoured Brigade	15 September 1941	17 June 1945	United Kingdom, Netherlands, Germany	Allied advance from Paris to the Rhine, Western Allied invasion of Germany	The brigade was formed when the 30th Independent Infantry Brigade (Guards) converted from an infantry to an armoured role, and was assigned to the Guards Armoured Division. On 15 January 1943, the brigade was redesignated as the 6th Guards Tank Brigade. The armoured brigade was reformed on 2 February 1945, from the redesignation of the 6th Guards Tank Brigade. The brigade became an infantry formation, the 6th Guards Brigade, on 17 June 1945 while based in Germany.	
7th Armoured Brigade	Existing	N/A	Egypt, Italian-Libya, Ceylon, Burma, British India, Iraq, Palestine, Syria, Italy, Austria	Western Desert campaign, Burma Campaign, Italian campaign	The brigade started the war in Egypt called the Light Armoured Brigade (Egypt). It was redesignated as the 7th Light Armoured Brigade on 16 February 1940, and then the 7th Armoured Brigade on 14 April 1940. On 1 March 1942, it was redesignated as the 7th Armoured Brigade Group, and reverted to its prior title on 4 June 1943. It was one of the original two brigades that formed the 7th Armoured Division, and remained with the division until November 1941. It then became an independent brigade, and was assigned to various commands. It ended the war in Austria.	
8th Armoured Brigade	1 August 1941	N/A	Palestine, Egypt, Italian-Libya, Tunisia, United Kingdom, France, Belgium, Netherlands, Germany	Western Desert campaign, Operation Overlord, Allied advance from Paris to the Rhine, Western Allied invasion of Germany	Formed in Palestine when the 6th Cavalry Brigade was converted into an armoured role. It was initially assigned to the 10th Armoured Division, but was used to supplement other formations through 1942. By the end of the year it was an independent armoured brigade. It ended the war in Germany.	
9th Armoured Brigade	3 August 1941	N/A	Syria, Iraq, Iran, Palestine, Egypt, Italy, United Kingdom	Second Battle of El Alamein, Italian campaign	Formed in Syria when the 4th Cavalry Brigade was converted into an armoured formation. The brigade was initially an independent formation until assigned to the 10th Armoured Division for five months, and thereafter was an independent formation. It ended the war in the United Kingdom.	
10th Armoured Brigade	1 November 1941	25 July 1942	United Kingdom	did not see combat	Formed when the 125th Infantry Brigade was reorganised as an armoured formation, and redesignated. On 25 July 1942, the brigade was redesignated as the 10th Tank Brigade.	
11th Armoured Brigade	1 November 1941	25 July 1942	United Kingdom	did not see combat	The brigade was formed when the 126th Infantry Brigade was redesignated, and reorganised as an armoured formation. On 25 July 1942, the brigade was redesignated as the 11th Tank Brigade.	
20th Armoured Brigade	Existing	30 April 1943	United Kingdom	did not see combat	The brigade started the war called the 20th Light Armoured Brigade. It was redesignated as the 20th Armoured Brigade on 14 April 1940. The brigade was disbanded on 30 April 1943.	
21st Armoured Brigade	11 June 1945	N/A	Italy	Italian campaign	The brigade was formed in Italy when the 21st Army Tank Brigade was redesignated. It ended the war in Italy.	
22nd Armoured Brigade	Existing	N/A	United Kingdom, Egypt, Italian-Libya, Tunisia, Italy, France, Belgium, Netherlands, Germany	Western Desert campaign, Italian campaign, Operation Overlord, Allied advance from Paris to the Rhine, Western Allied invasion of Germany	The brigade started the war called the 22nd Heavy Armoured Brigade. It was redesignated as the 22nd Armoured Brigade on 14 April 1940. On 4 March 1942, it was redesignated as the 22nd Armoured Brigade Group, and reverted to its previous title on 17 September 1942. The brigade served with several divisions. It was assigned to the 7th Armoured Division in June 1942, and remained so for the rest of the war. It ended the war based in Germany.	
23rd Armoured Brigade	1 November 1940	N/A	United Kingdom, Egypt, Italian-Libya, Tunisia, Italy, Palestine, Greece	Western Desert campaign, Allied invasion of Sicily, Italian campaign, Operation Manna	The brigade was formed by the redesignation of the 23rd Army Tank Brigade. On 12 July 1942, the brigade was redesignated as the 23rd Armoured Brigade Group. On 19 August 1944, the brigade was redesignated as Force 140 and was converted into an infantry formation to command forces based in Greece. On 19 October 1944, the armoured brigade was reformed following the conclusion of its duties in Greece. Elements of the brigade headquarters continued to function as a separate formation known as Arkforce, until 8 January 1945, and then they rejoined the brigade proper.	
24th Armoured Brigade	1 November 1940; 14 July 1944	1 March 1943; 29 September 1944	United Kingdom, Egypt, Italian-Libya	Western Desert campaign	The brigade was formed by the redesignation of the 24th Army Tank Brigade. On 30 August 1942, the brigade was redesignated as the 24th Armoured Brigade Group. The brigade ceased to function in December 1942 and was disbanded in Egypt on 1 March 1943. On 23 August 1943, the 24th Armoured Brigade (Dummy Tanks) was formed when the 74th Armoured Brigade (Dummy Tanks) was redesignated. The brigade was redesignated, between 26 May and 14 July 1944, as the 87th Armoured Brigade (Dummy Tanks). It transferred back to the United Kingdom in August 1944, and ceased to be an armoured formation on 29 September 1944.	
25th Armoured Engineer Brigade Royal Engineers	5 January 1945	N/A	Italy	Italian campaign	The brigade headquarters was formed by the redesignation of the 25th Army Tank Brigade, and the formation was initially known as B Assault Brigade (RAC/RE). It was redesignated as the 25th Armoured Engineer Brigade Royal Engineers on 6 April 1945. It ended the war in Italy.	
26th Armoured Brigade	12 October 1940	N/A	United Kingdom, Tunisia, Italy, Austria	Tunisian campaign, Italian campaign	Formed when the 1st Motor Machine Gun Brigade was redesignated. In November 1940, it was assigned to the 6th Armoured Division, and remained so for the duration of the war. It ended the war in Austria.	
27th Armoured Brigade	12 October 1940	30 July 1944	United Kingdom, France, Belgium, Netherlands, Germany	Operation Overlord, Allied advance from Paris to the Rhine, Western Allied invasion of Germany	The brigade was formed by the redesignation of the 1st Armoured Reconnaissance Brigade. It was disbanded in France, on 30 July 1944.	
28th Armoured Brigade	1 December 1940	21 August 1944	United Kingdom	did not see combat	Formed by redesignation of 3rd Motor Machine Gun Brigade. The brigade was disbanded on 21 August 1944.	
29th Armoured Brigade	28 December 1940	N/A	United Kingdom, France, Belgium, Netherlands, Germany	Operation Overlord, Allied advance from Paris to the Rhine, Western Allied invasion of Germany	Assigned to the 11th Armoured Division for the majority of the war, and ended the war in Germany.	
30th Armoured Brigade	27 December 1940	N/A	United Kingdom, France, Belgium, Netherlands, Germany	Operation Overlord, Allied advance from Paris to the Rhine, Western Allied invasion of Germany	In October 1943, the brigade was outfitted with tanks equipped with mine flails, and assigned to the 79th Armoured Division. It ended the war in Germany.	
31st Armoured Brigade	2 February 1945	N/A	Belgium, Netherlands, Germany	Western Allied invasion of Germany	Formed when the 79th Armoured Division's 31st Tank Brigade was redesignated. It remained with the division, and was equipped with specialised tanks and "Kangaroo" armoured personnel carriers. It ended the war in Germany.	
33rd Armoured Brigade	17 March 1944	22 August 1945	United Kingdom, France, Belgium, Netherlands, Germany	Operation Overlord, Allied advance from Paris to the Rhine, Western Allied invasion of Germany	Formed by redesignation of the 33rd Tank Brigade. In January 1945, the brigade was outfitted with specialised tanks, and posted to the 79th Armoured Division. The brigade was disbanded in Germany on 22 August 1945.	
34th Armoured Brigade	2 February 1945	N/A	Belgium, Netherlands, Germany	Western Allied invasion of Germany	The brigade was formed when the 34th Tank Brigade was redesignated. It ended the war in Germany.	
35th Armoured Brigade	14 July 1945	N/A	United Kingdom	did not see combat	The brigade was formed when the 35th Tank Brigade was redesignated. It ended the war in the United Kingdom.	
74th Armoured Brigade (Dummy Tanks)	5 July 1942	23 August 1943	Egypt	Not a combat formation	The brigade was formed in Egypt as part of a deception effort. On 23 August 1943, the brigade was redesignated as the 24th Armoured brigade (Dummy Tanks)	
87th Armoured Brigade (Dummy Tanks)	26 May 1944	14 July 1944	Egypt, Syria	Not a combat formation	Formed in Egypt when the 24th Armoured Brigade (Dummy Tanks) was redesignated. On 14 July 1944, the brigade reverted to being named the 24th Armoured brigade (Dummy Tanks)	
137th Armoured Brigade	20 July 1942	26 September 1943	United Kingdom	did not see combat	Formed when the 137th Infantry Brigade was reorganised as an armoured formation, and redesignated. It was disbanded on 26 September 1943.	

== Armoured Reconnaissance ==
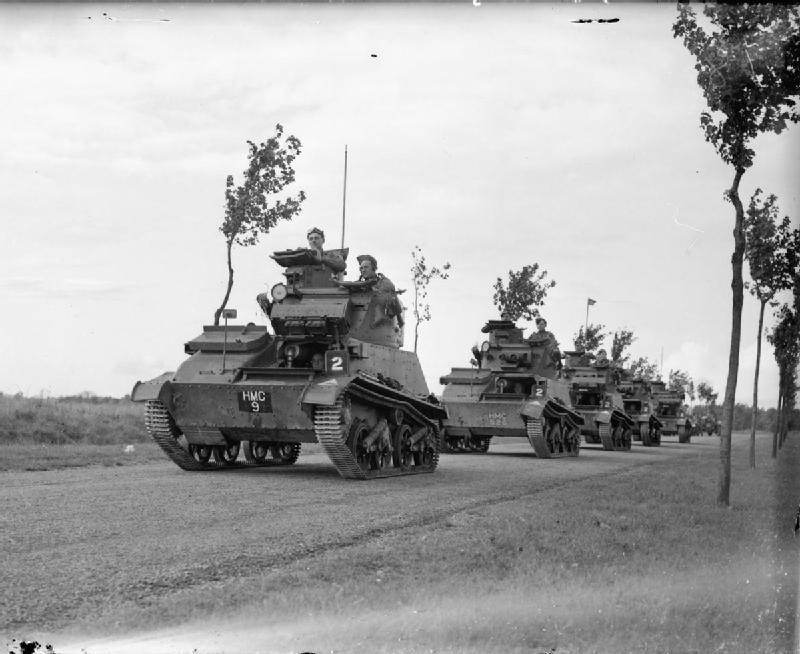
Light Tank Mk VIs of 13th/18th Hussars on patrol in France 1939. This unit would become part of the 1st Armoured Reconnaissance Brigade in 1940.

The British Expeditionary Force (BEF) was dispatched to France between 1939 and 1940, and was made up of 'regular' army divisions and divisions from the Territorial Army (TA). The divisions of the regular army differed from their TA counterparts, as they each contained a divisional cavalry regiment. It was a mechanised unit that included 28 light tanks, 44 scout carriers, and had around 480 personnel. Their intended role was to take over the former horse cavalry position of providing reconnaissance and flank protection to the division, as well as holding captured terrain for short periods of time. There was discussion among the BEF staff on how to use these units, and it was intended to remove them from the divisions and assign them as corps-level assets. This project was abandoned in favour of grouping the regiments into two armoured reconnaissance brigades.

The regiments assigned to the 1st Brigade were removed from their divisions and transported to Normandy to conduct training as a cohesive unit. Those assigned to the 2nd Brigade remained with their divisions and under the direct command of their divisional commanders. When Germany invaded Belgium, these regiments led their respective divisions into Belgium and then covered their withdrawal. Those assigned to the 1st Brigade had barely started training as a single formation, and were transported back towards the front to be used as individual reserve units under the direct command of the BEF.

After the Battle of France, the reconnaissance brigade concept was not readopted. New reconnaissance units were formed, which eventually became part of the Reconnaissance Corps, and were assigned to each infantry division. For the armoured divisions, reconnaissance was provided by armoured car regiments. As the war progressed, the latter became an asset of an army corps. Within the armoured division, they were replaced by a medium or cruiser tank-equipped armoured reconnaissance regiments. However, by July 1944, these regiments were largely being used as a regular combat unit rather than for reconnaissance purposes.

Armoured reconnaissance brigades
Formation name	Existing formation or date created	Date formation ceased to exist	Locations served	Notable campaigns	Notes	Source(s)
1st Armoured Reconnaissance Brigade	30 March 1940	26 November 1940	France, Belgium, United Kingdom	Battle of France	The brigade was formed in France from British forces based there. On 26 November 1940, after its return to the United Kingdom, it was redesignated as the 27th Armoured Brigade.	
2nd Armoured Reconnaissance Brigade	30 March 1940	23 June 1940	France, Belgium, United Kingdom	Battle of France	The brigade was formed in France from British forces based there. On its return to the United Kingdom, after the Battle of France, it was redesignated as the 3rd Motor Machine Gun Brigade on 23 June 1940.	

== Cavalry ==
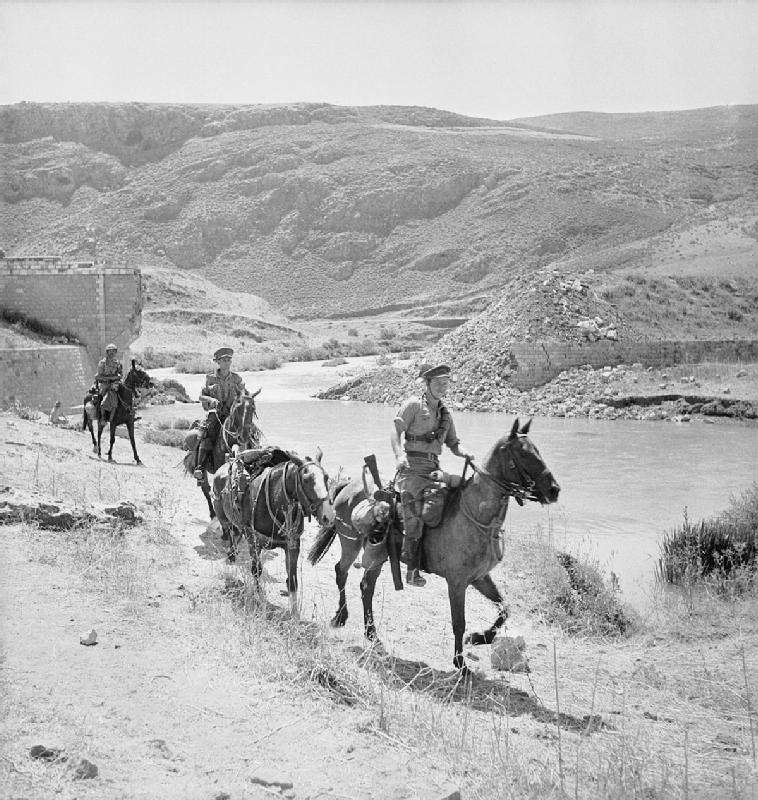
Elements of the 6th Cavalry Brigade on patrol.

The British Army began the war with two cavalry brigades (5th and 6th). (Note: The 1st and the 2nd Cavalry Brigades existed until early 1939, when they were renamed as the 1st Light and the 2nd Light Armoured Brigades. During the year, the Cavalry Brigade (Egypt) was redesignated as the 7th Light Armoured Brigade. In early 1939, the 20th Cavalry Brigade was formed and on the outbreak of the war, it as retitled the 20th Light Armoured Brigade.) Each were made up of three regiments and were part of the Territorial Army's part-time reserve. A third brigade, also of three regiments, was formed after the outbreak of the war. These three brigades were grouped together in the 1st Cavalry Division. The army's doctrine called for the brigades to function as mounted infantry: moving from place to place on horseback, and then dismounting to engage opposing forces with rifles, machine guns, and supported by artillery.

In early 1940, the three brigades left the United Kingdom for France. They then moved across the country to the port of Marseille, where they boarded ships and travelled to Palestine. While based in Palestine, it was intended that all three brigades would be motorised. By May 1941, only the 4th Cavalry Brigade had received enough vehicles for this to happen, as the others had been used as a pool from which to draw materiel for other formations based in the Middle East. The 4th Brigade subsequently fought as a motorised infantry brigade in several campaigns. Two of the brigades, along with the divisional headquarters, were slowly converted into armoured formations as additional equipment arrived in the Middle East.

Cavalry brigades
Formation name	Existing formation or date created	Date formation ceased to exist	Locations served	Notable campaigns	Notes	Source(s)
4th Cavalry Brigade	23 October 1939	1 August 1941	United Kingdom, France, Palestine, Iraq, Syria	Anglo-Iraqi War, Syria–Lebanon campaign	On 1 August 1941, the brigade converted and renamed the 9th Armoured Brigade	
5th Cavalry Brigade	Existing; 3 September 1943	2 June 1942; 3 September 1943	United Kingdom, France, Palestine, Syria	did not see combat	On 23 April 1942, the brigade was redesignated the Headquarters Desert (5 Cav) Brigade. On 2 June 1942, the formation was redesignated as the 8th Division. On 3 September 1943, following the 8th Division being disbanded, Headquarters Desert (5 Cav) Brigade was reformed and disbanded.	
6th Cavalry Brigade	Existing	1 August 1941	United Kingdom, Palestine	did not see combat	On 1 August 1941, the brigade was redesignated as the 8th Armoured Brigade	

== Motor Machine Gun ==
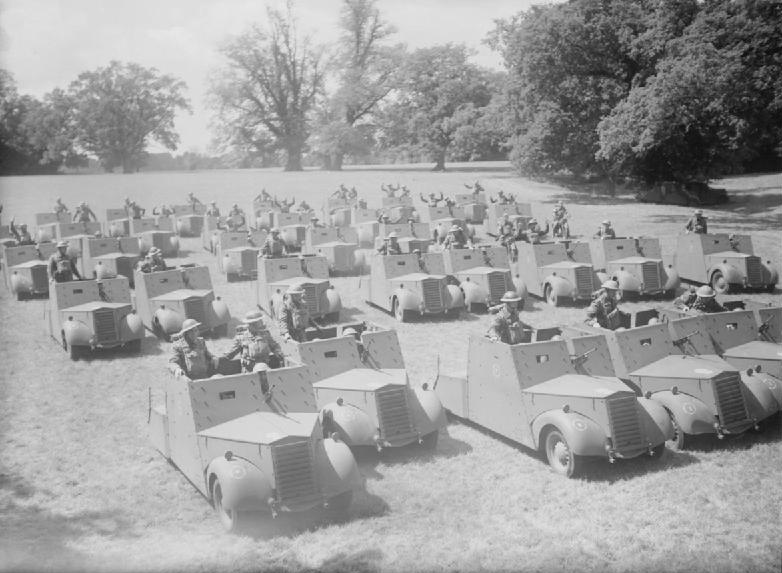
In the absence of tanks, units were equipped with armoured cars during the summer of 1940. In this example, the unit is equipped with Standard Beaverette reconnaissance cars.

In June 1940, the British Army had retreated from mainland Europe following the Battle of France. As a result, the army lost nearly all the tanks it had dispatched. Tank production during 1939 and the opening of 1940 had been low, with most dispatched to either France or to British forces based in North Africa. This resulted in few tanks being available within the United Kingdom when the British Army needed to rearm. The British Expeditionary Force's divisional cavalry, including the 2nd Armoured Reconnaissance Brigade, could not be re-equipped with tanks. Other units, such as the 43rd Royal Tank Regiment, had been based in the United Kingdom since the start of the war and purportedly was an armoured unit, despite it never having been allocated tanks because of the lack of availability. These forces were grouped together and formed into the motor machine gun brigades. The various units were outfitted with a variety of armoured cars (pre-built or improvised) and trucks that had been armed with Vickers Medium Machine Guns, Bren machine guns, and Boys anti-tank rifles. The majority of the brigade's personnel acted as motorised infantry. As new tanks became available, the individual units were re-equipped, and the brigades redesignated.

list of Motor Machine Gun brigades
Formation name	Existing formation or date created	Date formation ceased to exist	Locations served	Notable campaigns	Notes	Source(s)
1st Motor Machine Gun Brigade	30 May 1940	12 October 1940	United Kingdom	did not see combat	The brigade was formed from regiments based in the United Kingdom that had been earmarked to join the 3rd Armoured Division, which had not been created. On 12 October, it was redesignated as the 26th Armoured Brigade.	
2nd Motor Machine Gun Brigade	1 June 1940	10 December 1940	United Kingdom	did not see combat	The brigade was formed when the 25th Tank Brigade was redesignated. On 10 December 1940, it was redesignated back to the 25th Army Tank Brigade.	
3rd Motor Machine Gun Brigade	23 June 1940	1 December 1940	United Kingdom	did not see combat	The brigade was formed when the 2nd Armoured Reconnaissance Brigade was redesignated. On 1 December 1940, it was redesignated as the 28th Armoured Brigade.	

== Support Groups ==
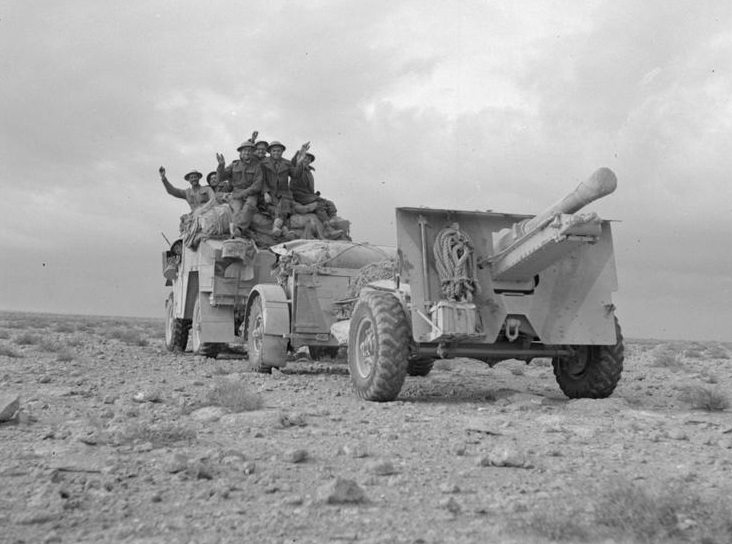
British artillery being towed through the desert

The support group included the supporting arms that were assigned to an armoured division. The numerical designation of the group corresponded to the armoured division to which it was allocated. Prior to the outbreak of the war, these formations were known as pivot groups. Ideally, each support group would consist of two motorised infantry battalions, as well as artillery, anti-tank, and light anti-aircraft guns. At full strength, the support group would have sixteen 25-pounder field gun-howitzers, twenty-four 2-pounder anti-tank guns, and twenty-four Bofors 40 mm gun anti-aircraft guns. In October 1940, the structure of the support group was changed to remove the two motorised infantry battalions. They were to be transferred to the division's armoured brigades, and were to be replaced by a single infantry battalion within the support group. The 7th Support Group, the only support group that was active at the time of the change and also included infantry, did not abide by the change and maintained two battalions through to November 1941.

British armoured doctrine dictated that the infantry were not to supplement the tanks. Rather, they were to protect them at leaguer, hold a position occupied by the administrative and supply vehicles, or secure a location that the tanks had captured. This idea was not re-examined until after Operation Crusader, which was fought in North Africa and ended in January 1942. Consequently, the support groups were abolished, and the armoured divisions were reorganised around two brigade groups: one composed of three armoured regiments and a motorised infantry battalion, and the other based around three motorised infantry battalions. The change also saw an additional artillery regiment assigned. The units previously assigned to the support groups were either broken-up and allocated to each brigade group or assigned to their own respective command, such as a divisional artillery headquarters. Following the lessons learnt in North Africa, the armoured divisions based within the United Kingdom were also reorganised, but without implementing the use of brigade groups. Despite the authorised change, it took several months for these lessons to be absorbed and the first support groups to be disbanded.

Support groups
Formation name	Existing formation or date created	Date formation ceased to exist	Locations served	Notable campaigns	Notes	Source(s)
Guards Support Group	16 September 1941	1 June 1942	United Kingdom	did not see combat	Formed when the 7th Infantry Brigade (Guards) was redesignated. The support group was disbanded on 1 June 1942.	
1st Support Group	Existing	11 February 1942	United Kingdom, France, Egypt, Italian-Libya	Battle of France, Western Desert campaign	The support group was disbanded on 11 February 1942, and its forces dispersed.	
2nd Support Group	6 February 1940	18 May 1941	United Kingdom, Egypt, Italian-Libya	Western Desert campaign	Assigned to the 2nd Armoured Division, which was defeated and suffered heavy losses following the first German offensive in North Africa. The remnants of the support group returned to Egypt on 17 April 1941 and was disbanded on 18 May.	
6th Support Group	2 November 1940	1 June 1942	United Kingdom	did not see combat	Disbanded on 1 June 1942	
7th Support Group	22 January 1940	9 February 1942	Egypt, Italian-Libya	did not see combat	Formed in Egypt, when the 7th Armoured Division's pivot group was redesignated. It was redesignated as the 7th Motor Brigade on 9 February 1942.	
8th Support Group	7 November 1940	23 July 1942	United Kingdom, Egypt	Western Desert campaign	Disbanded on 23 July 1942	
9th Support Group	4 December 1940	12 June 1942	United Kingdom	did not see combat	Disbanded on 12 June 1942	
11th Support Group	9 March 1941	1 June 1942	United Kingdom	did not see combat	Disbanded on 1 June 1942	
42nd Support Group	1 November 1941	1 June 1942	United Kingdom	did not see combat	Formed when the headquarters of the 127th Infantry Brigade was redesignated. The support group was disbanded on 1 June 1942	

== Tank ==
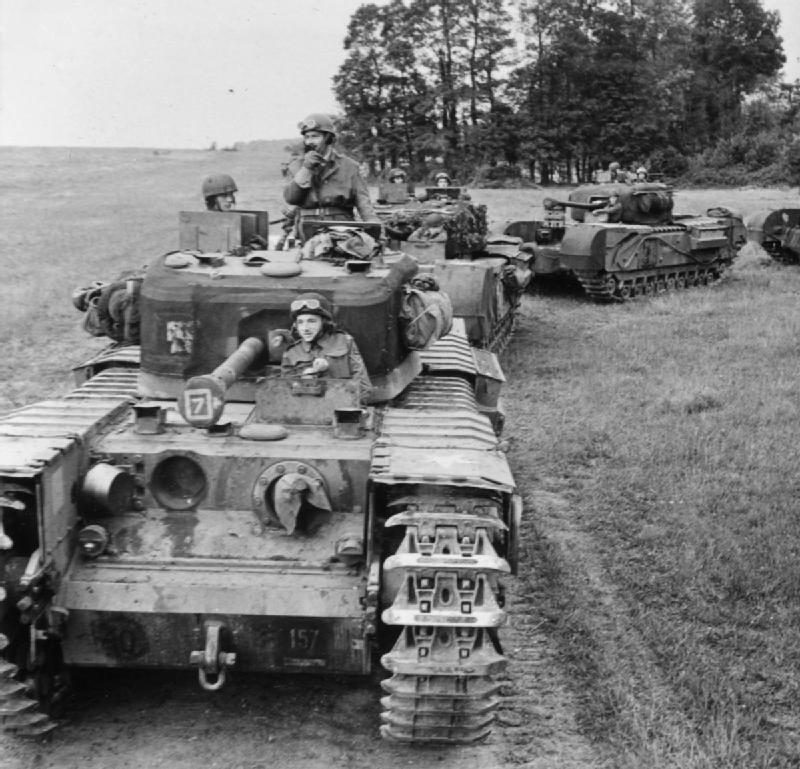
Churchill tanks, a type of infantry tank, of the 34th Tank Brigade.

The tank brigade was an independent formation that would be assigned to a corps level command and be allocated to provide support to an infantry division as the need arose. The brigades were equipped primarily with infantry tanks and would assist the infantry division in penetrating the enemy's defensive line. The intent was that any subsequent gap would then be exploited by the faster moving tanks of an armoured division. In 1942, the British Army experimented with the format of their infantry divisions. Several were converted into "mixed divisions", which saw the removal of one infantry brigade that was replaced with a tank brigade. The concept was deemed unsuccessful and was abandoned the following year. (Note: While the British Army abandoned the concept, it was embraced by New Zealand. The 2nd New Zealand Division was reorganised in 1943 as a mixed division of two infantry brigades and one medium tank-equipped armoured brigade, prior to being deployed to the Italian campaign. It maintained this structure through to the end of the war.)

In 1939, it was intended that each brigade would have 150 infantry and 25 light tanks, with total personnel of around 1,500 men. In 1941, the war establishment of the brigade was changed to 178 tanks and around 1,800 men. The following year, the establishment was further increased to 202 tanks and around 1,900 men. A final organisational change took place in November 1943. Each brigade would have 240 tanks, which included 18 tanks equipped with close support howitzers, 33 light tanks for reconnaissance, 18 tanks equipped with anti-aircraft guns, eight tanks outfitted as artillery observation posts, and three tanks with bridge-laying equipment. In January 1945, the British Army decided that all remaining tank brigades would be redesignated as armoured brigades.

Formation name	Existing formation or date created	Date formation ceased to exist	Locations served	Notable campaigns	Notes	Source(s) +Tank brigades
1st Army Tank Brigade	Existing	18 November 1944	United Kingdom, France, Belgium, Egypt, Italian-Libya, Palestine, Netherlands	Battle of France, Western Desert campaign, Western Allied invasion of Germany	The brigade was redesignated the 1st Tank Brigade on 23 April 1944. In October 1944, the brigade was dispersed to provide reinforcements for other formations, and on 18 November the brigade was placed in 'suspended animation'.	
6th Guards Tank Brigade	15 January 1943	2 February 1945	United Kingdom, France, Belgium, Netherlands	Operation Overlord, Western Allied invasion of Germany	The brigade was formed when the 6th Guards Armoured Brigade was redesignated. It was redesignated as the 6th Guards Armoured Brigade on 2 February 1945.	
10th Tank Brigade	25 July 1942	25 November 1943	United Kingdom	did not see combat	The brigade was formed when the 10th Armoured Brigade was redesignated. From October 1942, the brigade became a training formation. It was disbanded on 25 November 1943.	
11th Tank Brigade	25 July 1942	23 November 1943	United Kingdom	did not see combat	The brigade was formed when the 11th Armoured Brigade was redesignated. During 1943, the brigade was a training formation. It was disbanded on 23 November 1943.	
21st Army Tank Brigade	Existing	11 June 1945	United Kingdom, Tunisia, Italy	Tunisian campaign, Italian campaign	The brigade was redesignated the 21st Tank Brigade on 6 June 1942, and on 11 June 1945 it was redesignated as the 21st Armoured Brigade.	
23rd Army Tank Brigade	Existing	1 November 1940	United Kingdom	did not see combat	The brigade was redesignated as the 23rd Armoured Brigade on 1 November 1940.	
24th Army Tank Brigade	Existing	1 November 1940	United Kingdom	did not see combat	The brigade was redesignated as the 24th Armoured Brigade on 1 November 1940	
25th Army Tank Brigade	Existing; 10 December 1940	28 May 1940; 5 January 1945	United Kingdom, Tunisia, Italy	Tunisian campaign, Italian campaign	The brigade was reorganised as the 2nd Motor Machine Gun Brigade on 28 May 1940, and reverted bank to the 25th Army Tank Brigade on 10 December 1940. On 1 June 1942, the brigade was redesignated the 25th Tank Brigade. On 5 January 1945, the brigade headquarters was redesignated as the 25th Armoured Engineer Brigade Royal Engineers.	
31st Army Tank Brigade	15 January 1941	2 February 1945	United Kingdom, France, Belgium, Netherlands	Operation Overlord, Western Allied invasion of Germany	In May 1942, the brigade was redesignated as the 31st Tank Brigade. In September 1944, the brigade was assigned to the 79th Armoured Division, and reequipped with specialised tanks. On 2 February 1945, it became the 31st Armoured Brigade.	
32nd Army Tank Brigade	15 September 1941	22 June 1942	Egypt, Italian-Libya, Palestine	Western Desert campaign	The brigade was formed in Egypt. On 22 June 1942, it was captured in Tobruk when the port was taken following the Axis victory in the Battle of Gazala.	
33rd Army Tank Brigade	30 August 1941	17 March 1944	United Kingdom	did not see combat	The brigade was originally formed to oversee the training and conversion of infantry battalions to tank battalions, and became an active formation in October 1941. In June 1942, the brigade was redesignated the 33rd Tank Brigade. On 17 March 1944, it was redesignated as the 33rd Armoured Brigade.	
34th Army Tank Brigade	1 December 1941	2 February 1945	United Kingdom, France, Belgium, Netherlands	Operation Overlord, Western Allied invasion of Germany	The brigade was formed by when the 226th Independent Infantry Brigade (Home) was redesignated. In June 1942, the brigade was redesignated the 34th Tank Brigade. On 2 February 1945, it was redesignated the 34th Armoured Brigade.	
35th Army Tank Brigade	1 December 1941	14 July 1945	United Kingdom, France, Belgium, Netherlands	Operation Overlord, Western Allied invasion of Germany	The brigade was formed by when the 225th Independent Infantry Brigade (Home) was redesignated. In June 1942, the brigade was redesignated the 35th Tank Brigade. In April 1943, the brigade was assigned to the 79th Armoured Division and was equipped with specialised tanks. It was reassigned in April 1944, and remained in the United Kingdom. On 14 July 1945, it was redesignated the 35th Armoured Brigade.	
36th Army Tank Brigade	1 December 1941	31 July 1943	United Kingdom	did not see combat	The brigade was formed by when the 205th Independent Infantry Brigade (Home) was redesignated. On 12 August 1942, the brigade was redesignated the 36th Tank Brigade, but was disbanded on 31 July 1943.	

== See also ==
- British Army during the Second World War
- List of British brigades of the Second World War

== Notes ==
Footnotes

Citations
