= List of British anti-aircraft brigades of the Second World War =

This is a list of British anti-aircraft brigades that existed during the Second World War.

== Anti-aircraft brigades ==
Anti-Aircraft brigades
Formation name	Notes	Source(s)
1st Anti-Aircraft Brigade	Served in Battle of France, then home defence before taking part in North Africa campaign and ended the war in the Levant	
1st Royal Marine Anti-Aircraft Brigade		
2nd Anti-Aircraft Brigade		
3rd Anti-Aircraft Brigade		
4th Anti-Aircraft Brigade		
5th Searchlight Brigade		
5th Royal Marine Anti-Aircraft Brigade		
6th Anti-Aircraft Brigade	The brigade was re-designated the 102nd Anti-Aircraft Brigade	
7th Light Anti-Aircraft/Searchlight Brigade		
8th Anti-Aircraft Brigade		
9th Heavy Anti-Aircraft Brigade		
10th Heavy Anti-Aircraft Brigade		
11th Anti-Aircraft Brigade		
12th Anti-Aircraft Brigade		
13th Anti-Aircraft Brigade		
14th Anti-Aircraft Brigade		
15th Anti-Aircraft Brigade		
16th Anti-Aircraft Brigade		
17th Anti-Aircraft Brigade		
18th Anti-Aircraft Brigade		
20th Anti-Aircraft Brigade		
21st Anti-Aircraft Brigade		
22nd Anti-Aircraft Brigade		
23rd Anti-Aircraft Brigade		
24th Anti-Aircraft Brigade		
25th Anti-Aircraft Brigade		
26th (London) Anti-Aircraft Brigade		
27th (Home Counties) Anti-Aircraft Brigade	The brigade was re-designated as the 303rd Infantry Brigade on 22 January 1945	
28th (Thames and Medway) Anti-Aircraft Brigade		
29th (East Anglian) Anti-Aircraft Brigade		
30th (Northumbrian) Anti-Aircraft Brigade		
31st (North Midland) Anti-Aircraft Brigade		
32nd (Midland) Anti-Aircraft Brigade		
33rd (Western) Anti-Aircraft Brigade		
34th (South Midland) Anti-Aircraft Brigade		
35th Anti-Aircraft Brigade		
36th (Scottish) Anti-Aircraft Brigade		
37th Anti-Aircraft Brigade		
38th Light Anti-Aircraft Brigade	The brigade was re-designated as the 304th Infantry Brigade on 22 January 1945	
39th Anti-Aircraft Brigade	The brigade was re-designated as the 103rd Anti-Aircraft Brigade	
40th Anti-Aircraft Brigade		
41st (London) Anti-Aircraft Brigade		
42nd Anti-Aircraft Brigade		
43rd Anti-Aircraft Brigade		
44th Anti-Aircraft Brigade		
45th Anti-Aircraft Brigade		
46th Anti-Aircraft Brigade		
47th Anti-Aircraft Brigade		
48th Anti-Aircraft Brigade		
49th Anti-Aircraft Brigade	The brigade was re-designated as the 305th Infantry Brigade on 22 January 1945	
50th Light Anti-Aircraft Brigade		
51st Light Anti-Aircraft Brigade		
52nd Light Anti-Aircraft Brigade		
53rd Light Anti-Aircraft Brigade	The brigade was re-designated as the 106th Anti-Aircraft Brigade	
54th Anti-Aircraft Brigade		
55th Light Anti-Aircraft Brigade	The brigade was re-designated as the 306th Infantry Brigade on 22 January 1945	
56th Light Anti-Aircraft Brigade		
57th Light Anti-Aircraft Brigade		
58th Anti-Aircraft Brigade		
59th Anti-Aircraft Brigade	The brigade was re-designated as the 307th Infantry Brigade on 22 January 1945	
60th Anti-Aircraft Brigade		
61st Anti-Aircraft Brigade	The brigade was re-designated as the 308th Infantry Brigade on 22 January 1945	
62nd Anti-Aircraft Brigade		
63rd Anti-Aircraft Brigade		
64th Anti-Aircraft Brigade		
65th Anti-Aircraft Brigade		
66th Anti-Aircraft Brigade		
67th Anti-Aircraft Brigade		
68th Anti-Aircraft Brigade		
69th Anti-Aircraft Brigade		
70th Anti-Aircraft Brigade	The brigade was re-designated the 104th Anti-Aircraft Brigade	
71st Anti-Aircraft Brigade		
72nd Anti-Aircraft Brigade	The brigade was re-designated the 105th Anti-Aircraft Brigade	
73rd Anti-Aircraft Brigade		
74th Anti-Aircraft Brigade		
75th Anti-Aircraft Brigade		
76th Anti-Aircraft Brigade		
77th Anti-Aircraft Brigade		
79th Anti-Aircraft Brigade		
80th Anti-Aircraft Brigade		
81st Anti-Aircraft Brigade		
82nd Anti-Aircraft Brigade		
83rd Anti-Aircraft Brigade		
100th Anti-Aircraft Brigade		
101st Anti-Aircraft Brigade		
102nd Anti-Aircraft Brigade	The brigade was formed from the re-designation of the 6th Anti-Aircraft Brigade.	
103rd Anti-Aircraft Brigade	The brigade was formed from the re-designation of the 39th Anti-Aircraft Brigade. In April 1945, it was re-designated the 103rd Infantry Brigade.	
104th Anti-Aircraft Brigade	The brigade was formed from the re-designation of the 70th Anti-Aircraft Brigade.	
105th Anti-Aircraft Brigade	The brigade was formed from the re-designation of the 72nd Anti-Aircraft Brigade.	
106th Anti-Aircraft Brigade	The brigade was formed from the re-designation of the 53rd Anti-Aircraft Brigade.	
107th Anti-Aircraft Brigade		

== See also ==
- British Army during the Second World War
