= 28th Armoured Brigade =

2nd Armoured Reconnaissance Brigade 3rd Motor Machine Gun Brigade 28th Armoured Brigade
- Active: 30 March 1940 – 21 August 1944
- Country: United Kingdom
- Branch: British Army
- Type: Armoured
- Size: Brigade
- Part of: 9th Armoured Division

The 28th Armoured Brigade was an armoured brigade formation of the British Army, raised during the Second World War.

== History ==
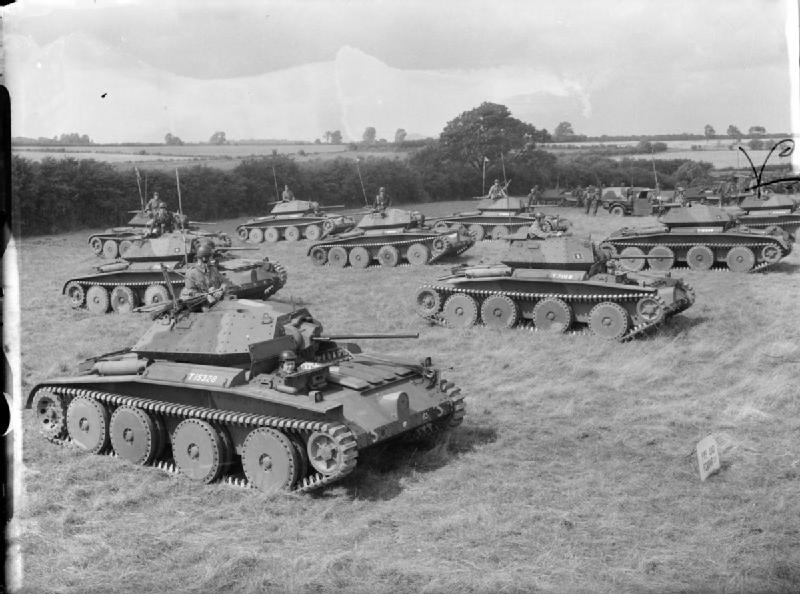
Covenanter tanks of the Fife and Forfar Yeomanry, 9th Armoured Division, on parade at Guisborough in Yorkshire, 19 August 1941.

Formed from II Corps Cavalry Reconnaissance Regiments on 30 March 1940 as the 2nd Armoured Reconnaissance Brigade. After the Dunkirk evacuation, with the lack of armoured vehicles, it was converted into the 3rd Motor Machine Gun Brigade on 23 June 1940. As more equipment became available, it was converted into the 28th Armoured Brigade on 1 December 1940 and served in the United Kingdom throughout the war, under the command of the 9th Armoured Division. It was disbanded on 21 August 1944, without having seen active service as a unit. Its constituent armoured regiments would see service in the Northwest Europe Campaign, replacing units disbanded after severe casualties.

== Order of battle ==
- 5th Royal Inniskilling Dragoon Guards (30 March 1940 to 13 July 1944)
- 15th/19th The King's Royal Hussars (30 March 1940 to 20 June 1944)
- 1st Fife and Forfar Yeomanry (18 June 1940 to 20 August 1944)
- 2nd Battalion, Queen Victoria's Rifles (1 December 1940 to 15 January 1941, when it was redesignated 8th Battalion, King's Royal Rifle Corps)
- 8th Battalion, King's Royal Rifle Corps 15 January 1941 to 10 July 1944)

== Commanders ==
- Brigadier H. Lumsden (until 15 October 1941)
- Brigadier E.S.D. Martin (from 15 October 1941 until 30 October 1942)
- Brigadier H.R. Mackeson (from 30 October 1942 until 5 August 1944)
- Lieutenant-Colonel A.D. Taylor (acting, from 5 August 1944 until 13 August 1944)
- Lieutenant-Colonel W.G.N. Walker (acting, from 13 August 1944)

== See also ==
- British Armoured formations of World War II
- List of British brigades of the Second World War
