= 128th Light Anti-Aircraft Regiment, Royal Artillery =

87th Searchlight Regiment, RA 128th Light Anti-Aircraft Regiment, RA 628th Infantry Regiment, RA
- Royal Artillery cap badge
- Active: 23 January 1941 – 20 September 1945
- Country: United Kingdom
- Branch: British Army
- Type: Searchlight; Light AA; Infantry
- Role: Air Defence; Garrison
- Size: 4 Batteries
- Part of: Anti-Aircraft Command; 306th Infantry Brigade
- Engagements: Nottingham Blitz; North West Europe

The 128th Light Anti-Aircraft Regiment (128th LAA Rgt) was an air defence unit of Britain's Royal Artillery during World War II. The regiment was formed in March 1942 from the short-lived 87th Searchlight Regiment, Royal Artillery, which had only been raised in the previous year as part of the rapid expansion of Anti-Aircraft (AA) defences. It served in AA Command until near the end of the war, when it was converted into an infantry battalion for garrison duties in North West Europe.

== 87th Searchlight Regiment, RA ==
90 cm 'Projector Anti-Aircraft', displayed at Fort Nelson, Hampshire.

87th Searchlight Regiment (87th S/L Rgt) was created during the rapid expansion of AA defences during The Blitz. Regimental Headquarters (RHQ) was formed at Burnley in Lancashire on 23 January 1941 and it was allocated four S/L batteries numbered 529, 532, 533 and 534. The batteries came from different training regiments, where each had been formed on 14 November around a cadre of experienced men drawn from an existing S/L regiment:

- 529 S/L Bty, formed by 234th S/L Training Rgt at Carlisle, cadre from 71st (East Lancashire) S/L Rgt
- 532 S/L Bty, formed by 236th S/L Training Rgt at Oswestry, cadre from 34th (Queen's Own Royal West Kent) S/L Rgt
- 533 S/L Bty, formed by 236th S/L Training Rgt, cadre from 73rd (Kent Fortress) S/L Rgt
- 534 S/L Bty, formed by 237th S/L Training Rgt at Holywood, Northern Ireland, cadre from 3rd (Ulster) S/L Rgt

After training, the regiment was assigned to 53rd Light AA Brigade, commanding the S/L units of 4th AA Division across the North Midlands. The night Blitz was coming to an end, but Luftwaffe raids continued to overfly en route to Merseyside, including seven nights in May (the Liverpool Blitz), and Nottingham was raided on the night of 8/9 May (the Nottingham Blitz).

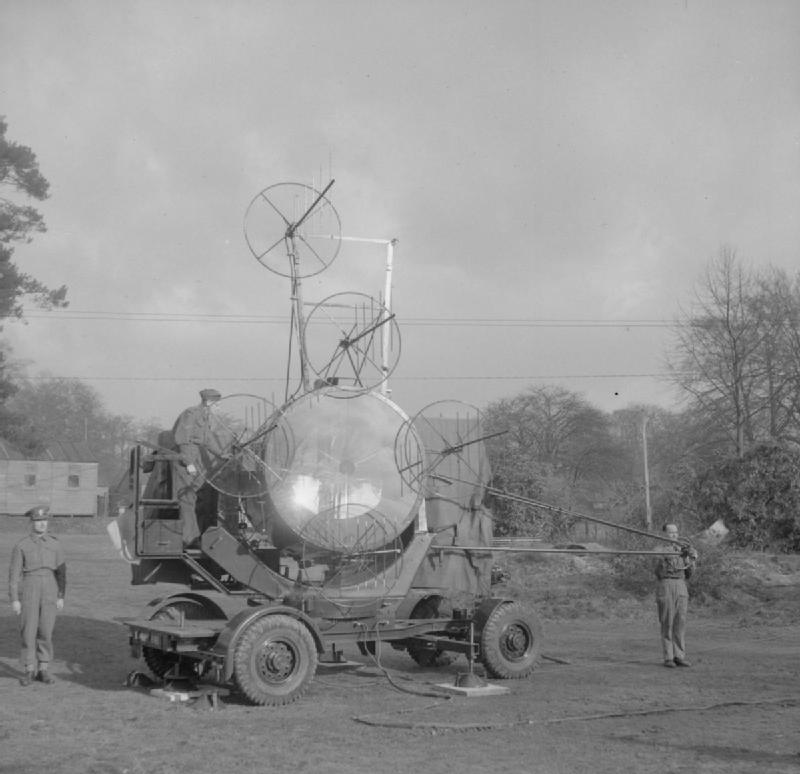
150 cm S/L with AA Radar No 2

The role of the S/L units was to track and illuminate raiders for the Heavy AA (HAA) guns of the Gun Defence Areas (GDAs) and for the few available Royal Air Force (RAF) night fighters. In November 1940 AA Command had adopted a system of clustering three S/Ls together to improve illumination, but this meant that the clusters had to be spaced 10,400 yards (9,500 m) apart. This layout was an attempt to improve the chances of picking up enemy bombers and keeping them illuminated for engagement by AA guns or night fighters. Eventually, one light in each cluster was to be equipped with Searchlight Control radar (SLC) and act as 'master light', but the radar equipment was still in short supply.

87th Searchlight Rgt remained with 53rd LAA Bde until the end of the year. By October 1941 the availability of SLC was sufficient to allow AA Command's S/L sites to be 'declustered' into single-light sites spaced at 6,000 yards (5,500 m) intervals in 'Indicator Belts' in the approaches to the GDAs, and 'Killer Belts' at 6,000 yards (5,500 m) spacing to cooperate with the RAF's night fighters.

== 128th Light Anti-Aircraft Regiment, RA ==
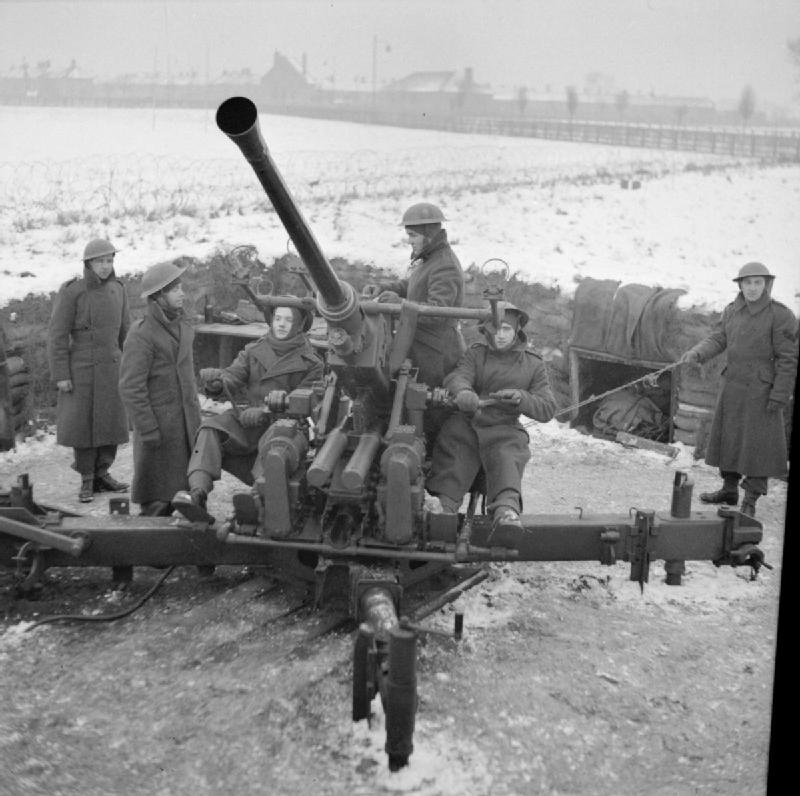
A Bofors crew undergoing training in early 1942.

After its rapid expansion, AA Command was now over-provided with S/L units and under-provided with LAA units, for which suitable guns (the Bofors 40 mm) were becoming available in quantity. The command began a programme of converting some S/L regiments to the LAA role. One of those chosen was 87th S/L Rgt, which became 128th Light Anti-Aircraft Regiment on 3 March 1942, with 421, 422, 423, 424 LAA Batteries, with 424 LAA Battery under direct War Office (WO) control.

=== Mid-War ===
The new regiment initially remained in 53rd LAA Bde, but by early April it had become unbrigaded as it completed retraining. In late May it joined 67th AA Bde in 11th AA Division. In June it transferred within the division to 54th AA Bde, and then in July it switched again to 68th AA Bde. 11th Anti-Aircraft Division's responsibility was the defence of Birmingham and the industrial West Midlands. During this period the Luftwaffe carried out a series of night attacks, the co-called Baedeker Blitz, including raids on Birmingham in June and July. On 16 June 1942, 424 LAA Bty returned from WO conyro, then in August the battery was loaned back to 4th AA Division, and then in the autumn to 54th AA Bde.

A reorganisation of AA Command in October 1942 saw the AA divisions disbanded and replaced by a smaller number of AA Groups more closely aligned with the groups of RAF Fighter Command. 11th and 4th AA Divisions merged to form 4 AA Group based at Preston and cooperating with No. 9 Group RAF. Shortly afterwards 128th LAA Regiment (with all four of its batteries) transferred to 60th AA Bde in 3 AA Group covering South West England, where LAA guns were urgently required to combat daylight raids by small formations of Luftwaffe fighter bombers against coastal towns and small ports. These raids continued until mid-1943

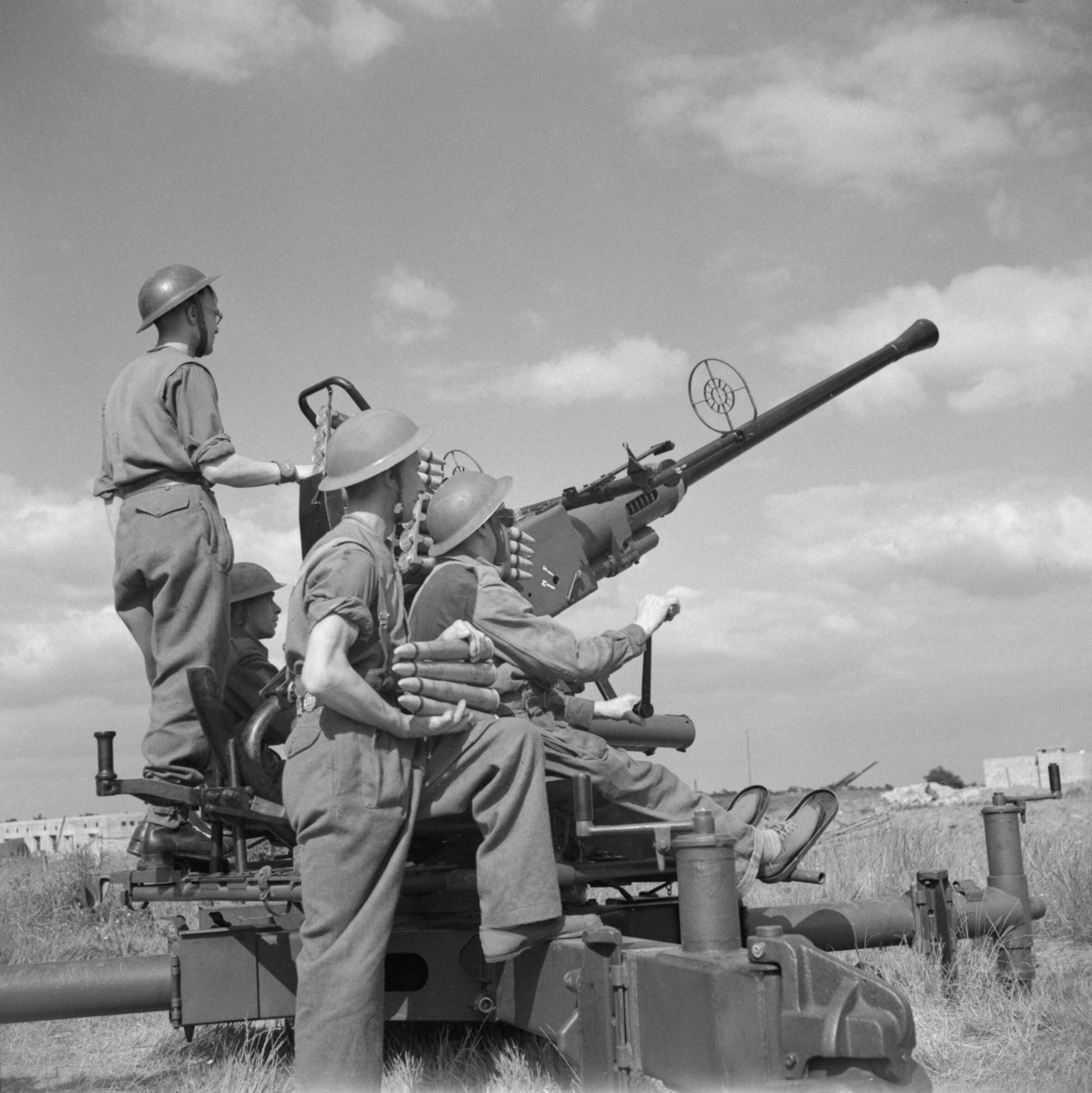
Bofors gun and crew, summer 1944.

=== Operations Overlord and Diver ===
With the lower threat of attack by the weakened Luftwaffe, AA Command was forced in early 1944 to release manpower for the planned invasion of Normandy (Operation Overlord). Many Home Defence AA regiments were reduced, and 128th LAA Regiment lost 424 LAA Battery, which began disbanding at Torquay, on 17 February 1944, completing by 16 March.

In the early part of 1944, 3 AA Group had responsibilities for protecting 'Overlord' camps and embarkation ports, and at the same time preparing for the expected onslaught of V-1 flying bombs ('Divers'). An elaborate anti-Diver plan was drawn up to protect Bristol, with belts of LAA guns and S/Ls across the predicted flight path. The V-1 offensive began on 13 June, a week after the 'Overlord' convoys had left harbour and the D Day landings had begun. In the event, the Bristol defences were not needed: US forces quickly sealed off the launching sites in the Cherbourg peninsula. The story in the London area was different, and as efforts to combat them (Operation Diver) progressed, AA units and formations were stripped from the West Country and repositioned along the coast of South East England. 3 AA Group HQ moved from Bristol to London, and 60th AA Bde was left as a skeleton force.

== 628th Infantry Regiment, RA ==
By the end of 1944, 21st Army Group fighting in North West Europe was suffering a severe manpower shortage, particularly among the infantry. At the same time, the Luftwaffe was suffering from such shortages of pilots, aircraft and fuel that serious conventional air attacks on the United Kingdom could be discounted. The WO began to reorganise surplus AA regiments into infantry battalions, primarily for line of communication and occupation duties, thereby releasing trained infantry for front-line service. 128th LAA Regiment was among those chosen, becoming 628th Infantry Rgt, RA on 23 January 1945, consisting of five batteries, A to E.

On 28 January the new regiment joined 306th Infantry Brigade (itself converted from 55th AA Bde). After training the brigade deployed to North West Europe on 4 May. The war in Europe ended on 8 May (VE Day), but the converted artillery units served in the occupation forces for several months.

628th Infantry Regiment disbanded on 20 September 1945.
