= Bradford Rifles =

Bradford Rifles 2nd Volunteer Bn, West Yorkshire Regiment 6th Bn West Yorkshire Regiment 49th (West Yorkshire) S/L Regiment, RA 601 Infantry Regiment, RA 584 (West Yorkshire) HAA Regiment, RA
- Active: 27 September 1859 – 1 May 1961
- Country: United Kingdom
- Branch: Territorial Army
- Role: Infantry; Air Defence
- Part of: 49th (West Riding) Division; 31 AA Brigade; 21st Army Group
- Garrison/HQ: Belle Vue Barracks, Bradford
- Engagements: Second Boer War; World War I: Battle of the Somme; Battle of Bullecourt; Battle of Poelcappelle; Battle of Cambrai; German spring offensive; Hundred Days Offensive; World War II: The Blitz; North West Europe

The Bradford Rifles was a Volunteer unit of the British Army formed in 1859. It went on to become a battalion of the West Yorkshire Regiment in the Territorial Force and saw action on the Western Front during World War I. Between the wars it converted into an air defence unit, serving during World War II first as a searchlight regiment defending West Yorkshire and later as a garrison battalion in North West Europe. Postwar it continued in the Territorial Army in the air defence role until 1955.

== Origin ==
During an invasion scare in 1859, large numbers of part-time Rifle Volunteer Corps (RVCs) were formed throughout Great Britain, eager to supplement the Regular British Army in case of need. On 27 September 1859, two independent companies formed in Bradford, West Yorkshire, designated the 5th and 6th (Bradford) Yorkshire West Riding RVCs. The following February the two units merged with other unnumbered Bradford companies to form the 5th RVC, renumbered in April 1860 as the 3rd following other mergers. The new 3rd Yorkshire West Riding RVC comprised four companies, which rose to five in October when it absorbed the newly established 24th (Eccleshill) RVC. The unit was large enough to function as an independent battalion, and the smaller 39th West Riding RVC (formed at Bingley in 1861, later at Saltaire), was attached to it until it was fully absorbed in the 1870s. In 1861 the unit built itself an armoury and drill hall at Manningham Lane, Bradford, which became known as Belle Vue Barracks.

Henry Sagar Hirst (1829–99), a member of a prominent family from nearby Clayton, was commissioned into the unit as an ensign when it formed, but after only three years he became its lieutenant-colonel commandant, a position he held from 1862 until 1890. He was awarded a CB for services to the Volunteer Movement.

== Volunteer Battalion ==
Under the scheme of 'localisation' introduced by the Cardwell Reforms, Volunteer units were affiliated with their local Regular regiments, and the 3rd West Riding RVC was assigned to Sub-District No 10, Brigade No 10 (West Riding of Yorkshire) based at the depot of the 14th Foot (later the West Yorkshire Regiment) at Bradford.

On 1 July 1881 the 3rd West Riding RVC became a Volunteer Battalion of the West Yorkshire Regiment, and on 1 December 1887, now eight companies strong, it was formally redesignated the 2nd Volunteer Battalion, Prince of Wales's Own (West Yorkshire) Regiment. The regimental uniform, which had been scarlet with Rifle green facings, was changed to scarlet faced white in 1887 (scarlet faced buff from 1904) to match the parent regiment.

While the regimental districts were referred to as 'brigades', they were purely administrative organisations and the Volunteers were excluded from the mobilisation system. The Stanhope Memorandum of December 1888 proposed a more comprehensive Mobilisation Scheme for Volunteer units, which would assemble in their own brigades at key points in case of war. In peacetime these brigades provided a structure for collective training. The volunteer battalions of the West Yorkshire Regiment and the Duke of Wellington's Regiment (West Riding) were assigned to the West Yorkshire Brigade, which would assemble at Leeds in case of emergency.

The 2nd Volunteer Battalion formed a cyclist company in 1900, and the same year provided an active service company of volunteers to fight alongside the Regulars in the Second Boer War. This gained the battalion its first Battle honour: South Africa 1900–02.

== Territorial Force ==
When the Volunteer Force was subsumed into the Territorial Force (TF) under the Haldane reforms in 1908, the 2nd Volunteer Battalion became the 6th Battalion, The Prince of Wales's Own (West Yorkshire Regiment) (6th West Yorkshires). The West Riding Brigade split, the four TF battalions of the West Yorkshires forming the 1st West Riding Brigade in the West Riding Division. On the outbreak of war in 1914, the 6th West Yorkshires were commanded by Lt-Col H.O. Wade.

== World War I ==
=== Mobilisation ===
Towards the end of July 1914, the units of the West Riding Division left their headquarters for their annual training camps, but on 3 and 4 August they were ordered to return; on 4 August immediate mobilisation was ordered. On the evening of 5 August, 575 out of the total strength of 589 of the 6th Bn were present at Belle Vue Barracks, and 215 former members had re-enlisted. By 8 August, the battalion was already up to its war establishment, including about 100 Class II National Reservists – old soldiers who would be invaluable for training the mass of recruits who were coming forward.

Shortly afterwards, TF units were invited to volunteer for Overseas Service and the majority of the battalion did so. On 15 August 1914, the War Office issued instructions to separate those men who had signed up for Home Service only, and form these into reserve units. On 31 August, the formation of a reserve or 2nd Line unit was authorised for each 1st Line unit where 60 per cent or more of the men had volunteered for Overseas Service. The titles of these 2nd Line units would be the same as the original, but distinguished by a '2/' prefix while the parent unit took '1/'. In this way duplicate battalions, brigades and divisions were created, mirroring those TF formations being sent overseas.

=== 1/6th Battalion ===
After mobilisation, the 1st West Riding Division concentrated in the South Yorkshire area, with the 1/6th Bn going to Selby on 10 August before moving to camp on Knavesmire Common, near York on 24 August. On 22 November half of the battalion was sent to Redcar to dig defences along the North Sea coast; it returned to York on 10 December, having handed over to the reserve companies furnished by the 2/6th Bn. At the end of February 1915 the battalion moved to billets in Gainsborough, Lincolnshire, and at the end of the month the division was informed that it had been selected to proceed to France as a complete formation.

On 15 April, the battalion entrained for Folkestone, where it embarked and landed at Boulogne the same night to join the British Expeditionary Force (BEF). On 22 April, the 1st West Riding Bde was attached to 7th Division for training in the routine of trench duties. On 28 April the West Riding Division took over its own section of the line at Fleurbaix. It now formed part of IV Corps, which attacked at the Battle of Aubers Ridge on 9 May. While the other two divisions of IV Corps made the actual attack, the West Riding Division took over the greater part of the corps' trench line. It was supposed to follow up and occupy the captured enemy line, but the breakthrough did not occur.

Corporal Samuel Meekosha, VC.

On 12 May, the division was designated 49th (West Riding) Division and the brigade became 146th (1st West Riding) Brigade.

For the next nine months, the 49th Division took part in no major operations but was almost continuously engaged in day-to-day trench warfare, much of it in the Ypres Salient, with the considerable casualties that this entailed. On 15 November 1915, the 1/6th West Yorkshires relieved the 1/8th Bn in trenches near the Yser Canal north east of Ypres. On 19 November, one of the platoons was heavily shelled, with six killed and seven wounded out of its strength of 20 men. Corporal Samuel Meekosha took command, sent a runner for assistance, and dug out the wounded and buried men while under heavy shell fire. Meekosha was awarded the Victoria Cross (VC), the first to be won in the division.

On 19 December, the division received a sudden attack with the new German phosgene gas, followed by heavy shelling. The battalion lined the parapet, but no serious infantry attack followed. In January 1916, the division was withdrawn for its first period of complete rest since it first entered the line.

==== Somme ====
In February 1916, the division went back into the line in the Somme sector, and spent the next few months alternating trench duties with working parties and training for the forthcoming Somme Offensive. For this the 49th Division formed the reserve for X Corps, which was tasked with seizing the Thiepval Spur, after which the 49th was to pass through and continue the pursuit. The West Riding battalions moved up to assembly trenches in Aveluy Wood before dawn on the day of the attack (1 July), and by 09:00 the 1/6th West Yorks had crossed the River Ancre and was in Thiepval Wood. Ordered to move towards Thiepval village to support the 36th (Ulster) Division, the battalion came under fire the moment it left the shelter of the wood. Men were caught by machine gun fire passing through a gap in a hedge, and it was plainly impossible to cross No man's land. The attacking companies lost half their strength, including the CO, Lt-Col Wade, who was wounded. The 1/6th Bn was withdrawn and became brigade reserve while the rest of the brigade attempted to relieve the beleaguered Ulstermen.

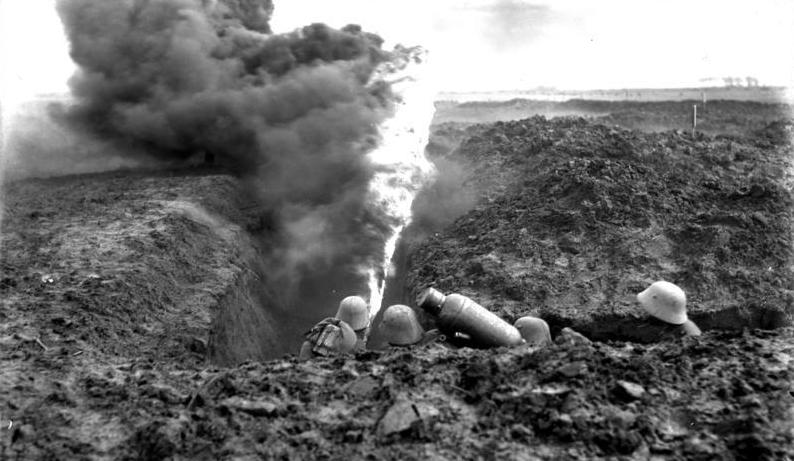
German troops using a flamethrower in a trench.

By 14 July, the British had taken Leipzig Redoubt on the Thiepval Spur; 1/6th West Yorkshires relieved 1/7th (Leeds Rifles) Bn in the line that night. Early the following morning, the Germans counter-attacked using flamethrowers. After the first surprise, the battalion manned the parapets and drove back most of the attackers. One German party got into a British sap, but were driven out by the battalion's bombers and the brigade's light mortar battery. The fight lasted about three hours.

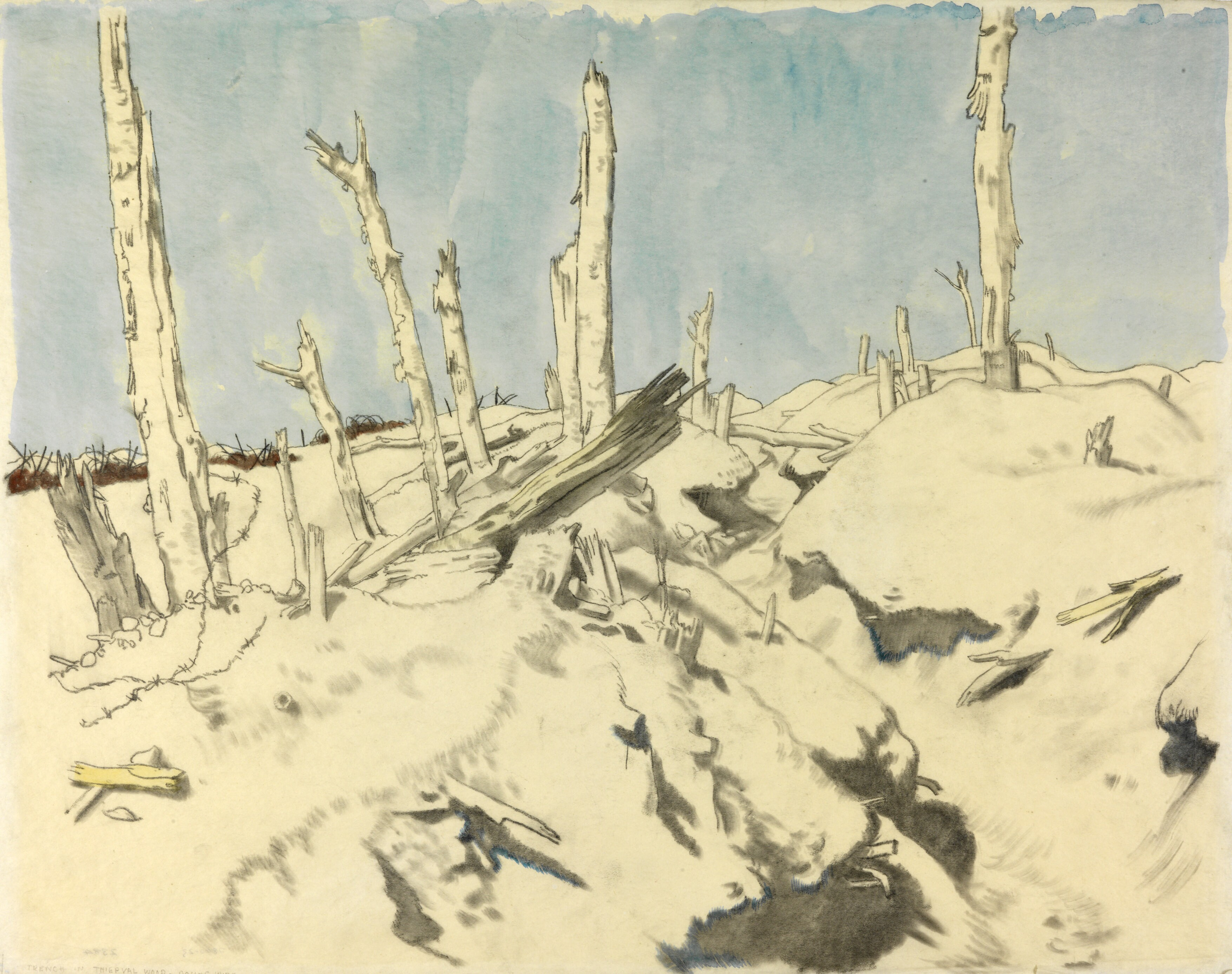
William Orpen, A Trench, Thiepval – German wire.

While the offensive continued, 49th Division remained holding the area round the Leipzig salient, with a number of small actions and suffering a good deal of shelling, while preparing trenches and dumps for a renewed attack in that sector. The attack was made on 3 September, at the end of the Battle of Pozières, and 1/6th Bn was in the first wave, which went over the top punctually at 05:10. Communication was poor, and after about four hours the remnants of the attacking companies were back on the start line. Although the first objectives had been reached, they could not be held, and many small parties were cut off and captured. A second attack was called off, and 146th Bde was withdrawn. 49th Division continued minor operations towards Thiepval during the Battle of Flers-Courcelette (15–22 September) before the offensive petered out.

==== Ypres ====
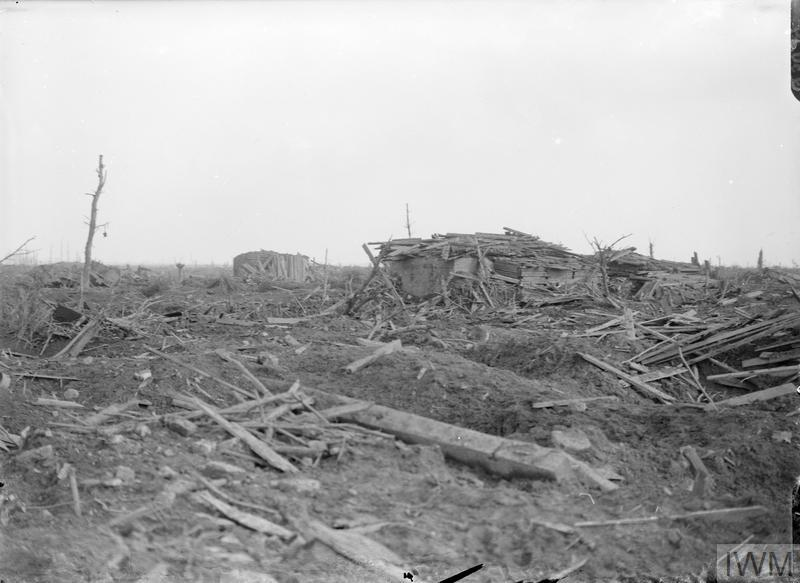
The ruins of Poelcapelle before the battle.

During the summer of 1917, the 49th Division was earmarked for operations along the Flanders coast that failed to materialise. In October it was moved to the Ypres sector to join the Third Ypres Offensive. It took part in the Battle of Poelcapelle on 9 October, with 1/6th West Yorkshires acting as the reserve battalion for 146th Bde in the centre of the attack. The troops had a long night approach march in rain across appalling ground under shellfire, and only just reached the jumping-off tapes in time for Zero. When the attack went in at 05:20, the rain stopped so that the German defenders had perfect visibility. 148th (3rd West Riding) Brigade was immediately stopped by a flooded stream, leaving 146th Bde to advance alone. They managed a few hundred yards before being stopped by a broad belt of undamaged German barbed wire. They were under fire from artillery, riflemen hidden in shell craters, and from machine guns in German pillboxes on the higher ground ahead. Although some of these pillboxes were taken, the division's attacking troops were back at their start line by the afternoon, having suffered heavy casualties.

==== Spring Offensive ====
Once 2/6th Bn West Yorkshires was disbanded at the end of January 1918 (see below), the 1/6th became simply '6th Bn' once more. 49th Division remained in the Ypres area during the winter of 1917–18 and was therefore not involved in the first stage of the German spring offensive. However, when the second phase (Operation Georgette, or the Battle of the Lys) began on 9 April, it soon began to put pressure on the southern part of the Ypres Salient. Brigade groups from 49th Division were sent south to support other British formations. On 11 April it was the turn of 146th Bde, which moved to the slopes of Mont Kemmel, eventually coming under the command of the 28th French Division. In the early hours of 25 April this position was heavily bombarded with smoke and gas shells, followed at 05:00 by an infantry attack shielded by morning mist. At 06:45, a company of 1/6th Bn was reported to be fighting a rearguard action under Captain George Sanders (who had won a VC as a Corporal with 1/7th Bn at Thiepval in 1916). Sanders was seen rallying his men from the top of a pillbox and firing into the enemy with his revolver before he fell. (Wounded and taken prisoner, he was later awarded the Military Cross (MC) to go with his VC.) The frontline companies having been overrun, the rest of the brigade fell back through Vierstraat Cross to Ouerdom, where the enemy advance was halted. In two days' fighting (25–26 April) the 6th Bn lost 22 officers and 461 other ranks. At Ouerdom on 27 April, the remnants of the brigade were temporarily formed into a composite battalion under the command of Major R. Clough of 6th Bn and placed in divisional reserve.

==== Hundred Days Offensive ====
The battalion returned to the fighting during the Allied Hundred Days Offensive. During the pursuit to the River Selle, 49th Division was ordered to attack on 12 October, but patrols found that the enemy had disappeared, so the barrage was cancelled and zero hour was brought forward. 146th Brigade reached the Villers-en-Cauchies railway before 13:00 and after a second advance the division established a line along the edge of the high ground overlooking the Selle, the opposite bank of which was strongly held. The other brigades failed to close up to the river next morning, but on 14 October the division seized Saulzoir and established small bridgeheads over the Selle.

After the BEF had forced the river line (the Battle of the Selle), there was a pause before the next bound of the pursuit. On 29 October 146th Bde returned to the line in front of Valenciennes, and on 1 November it stormed across the Rhonelle (the Battle of Valenciennes).

The division was relieved after this attack, and its infantry was still resting near Douai when the Armistice with Germany came into force on 11 November. 6th West Yorkshires served in Occupation Forces before demobilisation began in January 1919. This was virtually complete by the end of March, but the battalion was not formally disembodied until 30 March 1920.

=== 2/6th Battalion ===
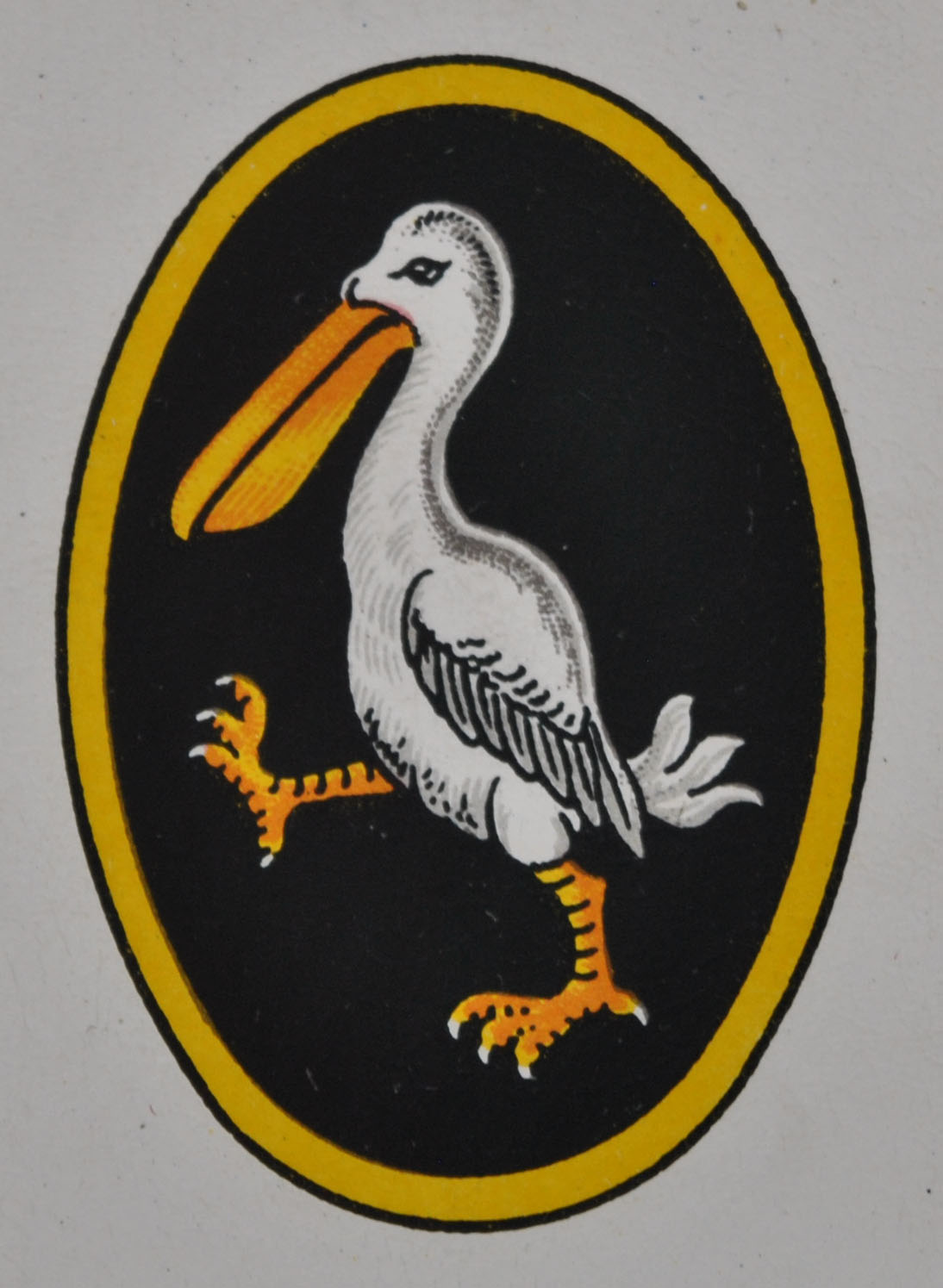
62nd (2nd West Riding) Division's pelican sign (called a duck by the troops): 'when t'duck puts foot down, t'war'll be ower'.

This battalion formed at Bradford on 12 September 1914, and became part of the 2/1st West Riding Bde in the 2nd West Riding Division. These were later numbered 185th Brigade and 62nd Division respectively.

2/6th West Yorkshires had recruited 1,500 men by November 1914, but until April 1915 they had no weapons with which to train. Some Lee-Enfields were then received, but these were withdrawn in May, and until the beginning of 1916 the 2nd Line Territorials had to make do with .256-in Japanese Ariska rifles, keeping their ammunition in their pockets until 1914 pattern webbing equipment arrived. With these antiquated weapons the 62nd Division was under orders to move at short notice to defend the East Coast, for which railway trains were kept in readiness. Training was also disrupted by the frequent calls to supply reinforcement drafts to the 1st line serving on the Western Front. In May 1915, the Home Service men of 185th Bde were withdrawn to form 26th Provisional Battalion serving in coast defence in North East England. In October, the division's 2nd Line battalions were reduced to 600 all ranks, the unfit men being posted to the 26th Provisional Bn and the surplus to the 3rd Line, which became the draft-finding unit.

In May 1915, the division moved into camp in 'The Dukeries' of Nottinghamshire, with the 2/6th Bn at Thoresby Park, where it trained until October. Then the division concentrated round Retford before going into the Tyne defences where it dug an entrenched defence line in December. It moved to Larkhill Camp on Salisbury Plain for battle training in January 1916 and finally received SMLE Mk III rifles and Lewis guns, but in June it was sent to the East Coast defences once more, where it was scattered round East Anglia. Here battle training was less convenient and it was again called upon to provide drafts to the Western Front. In October it moved inland to Bedfordshire and Northamptonshire.

Finally, in October 1916, orders were received to bring the division up to full establishment and prepare for overseas service. 185th Brigade embarked at Southampton on 8 January 1917, and the division completed its concentration in France on 18 January, with 2/6th West Yorkshires under the command of Lt-Col John Hastings.

The division took its place in the line in the Somme sector opposite Serre. Shortly afterwards, the German army began a planned retreat to the Hindenburg Line and from 15 February to 19 March the division's units were engaged in patrol work and stiff actions against rearguards while advancing across the devastated (and booby-trapped) ground until that line was reached. The division was then shifted to the line opposite Bullecourt in the southern part of the Arras sector, with 2/6th West Yorkshires at St Leger in brigade reserve.

==== Bullecourt ====
The Arras Offensive of 1917 opened on 9 April and the 62nd Division was prepared to advance if the attack on nearby Neuville-Vitasse succeeded. 2/6th West Yorkshires at St Leger were ordered to hold themselves in readiness to advance at one hour's notice in the afternoon. Despite brilliant success further north, the attack failed at Neuville-Vitasse, and the battalion had still not moved before dark on 10 April. It then made a night march to attack Bullecourt from the south west at 04:30 on 11 April. However, Lt-Col Hastings reported three times in two hours that the necessary conditions for his attack had not been met: no tanks had appeared to support the attack (nine out of 11 had been knocked out and the remaining two were missing), and there was no sign that the neighbouring Australian troops had entered Bullecourt. He was ordered to take immediate action to clear up the situation in Bullecourt without waiting for the tanks. Hastings insisted that a daylight attack (it was now 11:00) without cover could not succeed against uncut wire. Three hours later Brigade HQ accepted the situation and ordered Hastings to withdraw his patrols and relieve 2/7th Bn holding the front line trenches. The next day was spent probing the defences of Bullecourt before the battalion was relieved by the 2/7th Bn. The cancelled operation cost the 2/6th Bn two officers and 31 other ranks killed, together with 30 wounded. Nine men were dug out alive by 174th Tunnelling Company, Royal Engineers, from a collapsed house. Hastings was awarded a DSO for his efforts at Bullecourt.

185th Brigade held the line in abominable conditions and under shellfire for a week, and was then relieved for rest. A renewed attack on Bullecourt was made on 3 May. 62nd Division spent the preceding 17 days in rehearsals and the whole division attacked in waves behind tanks and a heavy barrage. 185th Brigade on the right, with 2/6th West Yorkshires on the extreme right, was tasked with taking Bullecourt itself. No man's land was 990 yards (905 m) wide and swept by machine gun fire from the right (in a gap between the 62nd and the Australians): in the smoke and confusion the 2/6th Bn sheered off to the left and lost touch with the rest of the division. Large numbers of the battalion's men were lying dead and wounded in the wire, and a company of 2/7th Bn went forward to try to make contact but were driven back. Of the rest of the 62nd Division, only a few parties got into the German positions. The survivors of 2/6th Bn drifted back to their starting positions, and were then withdrawn to reorganise. It was not until 17 May that the division finally cleared the village, and operations against the Hindenburg Line continued until 28 May.

After rest and reorganisation, 62nd Division returned to the line in June and began a period of several months of trench-holding. On the night of 1 September, C Company of 2/6th Bn successfully raided Ostrich Avenue and Sunken Road, destroying dugouts and taking prisoners. At dawn on 13 September 1917, the battalion suffered a retaliatory raid. It was holding the Apex, a captured section of the Hindenburg Line near Riencourt, when a force of German Stormtroopers raided the position with orders to destroy all the dugouts and inflict as much damage as possible. The raiders reached as far as the support trench but were repulsed largely through the efforts of Capt G.C. Turner, who was killed, and Lance-Serjeant W. Pearson who was fatally wounded.

==== Cambrai ====
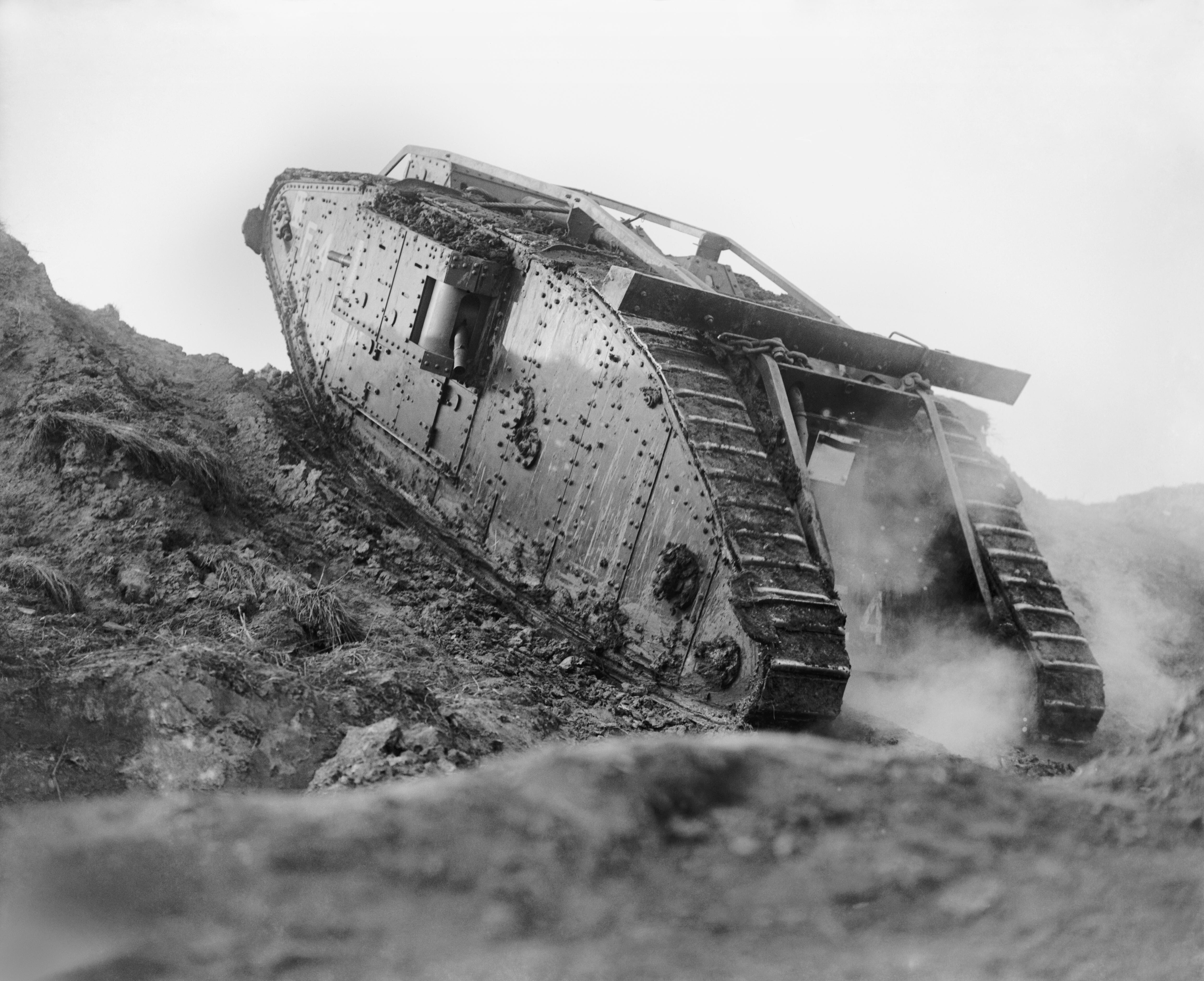
Mark IV Tank (female) training at Wailly 21 October 1917 for the Battle of Cambrai.

62nd Division moved into hutments at Beaulencourt in October 1917, where it trained for open warfare in preparation for the forthcoming Battle of Cambrai, including training with the Tank Corps at Wailly. On the night of 17/18 November, 185th Bde took up its positions in Havrincourt Wood.

The surprise attack was launched at dawn on 20 November, with no preceding bombardment; the artillery crashed down on its targets at zero hour. The brigade advanced with Mark IV tanks of G Battalion and a company of I BattalionTank Corps towards its first objective, Havrincourt village. The tanks had been held up by fallen trees in Havrincourt Wood and 185th Bde made a ragged start. 2/6th West Yorkshires under Lt-Col C.H. Hoare, with a company of 2/5th Bn and a section of 212th Company Machine Gun Corps under command, had some difficulty clearing the German outpost line, which was too near the British trenches to be bombarded. Nevertheless, A Company stormed the Hindenburg front line and entered the village from the east. Here they were held up by machine gun fire from II Battalion of the German 84th Infantry Regiment under Captain Soltau. The first tank, G3 commanded by Lieutenant William McElroy, now arrived on the west side of the village and made its way up the main street until its fuel tank was hit and the fire forced the crew to bale out. B and D Companies of the 2/6th Bn followed up and captured the village, driving Soltau and his men back to their battalion HQ at a farmhouse. Shortly after 08:45 the rest of the British tanks and infantry arrived and wiped him and his party out. It took the battalion another two hours to clear the maze of dugouts under the chateau while the rest of the brigade passed on to the second objective. By 11:30 the British had taken almost the whole of the Hindenburg Main and Support Lines over the frontage of the attack. 186th (2/2nd West Riding) Brigade then passed through to the next objective at Graincourt. Further progress was held up by the failure of 51st (Highland) Division to take Flesquières, leaving 62nd Division's right flank uncovered.

The divisional objective for the second day of the attack (21 November) was Bourlon Wood, led by 186th Bde with 185th Bde in close support. However, there were fewer tanks available and progress was slower than on the first day. Anneux was taken but Bourlon Wood remained out of reach. 185th Brigade relieved 186th in the ill-defined front line after dark. At dawn on 22 November, a heavy barrage came down on 2/6th West Yorkshires, who were also attacked by German aircraft. The following German infantry pushed the battalion back; a partial recovery was stopped by a second German attack that crumpled up the line on the left and the battalion, minus most of its frontline officers, retreated until it rallied on the Bapaume–Cambrai road. 62nd Division was relieved by 40th Division in a tricky operation that night.

The division was back in Bourlon Wood on 27 November for another attempt to complete its capture, for which 185th Bde was in support, relieving 187th Bde at the end of the day. The division succeeded in taking the last of Bourlon Ridge, which had been fought over for a week. The exhausted West Riding division was then relieved (under a hail of German gas shells) before the German counter-attack took back all the hard-won ground a few days later.

==== Disbandment ====
By the beginning of 1918, the BEF was suffering a manpower crisis and the decision was made to break up one battalion in each infantry brigade. 2/6th West Yorkshires was selected and most of its men were drafted as reinforcements to other units inside and outside 185th Brigade on 31 January 1918. Seven officers and 150 men went to 2/5th West Yorks and 9 officers and 300 men went to 2/7th West Yorks, while others joined 1/6th West Yorks in 49th Division (see above). The surplus men were sent to join remnants of 17 other battalions to form the 3rd Entrenching Battalion.

=== 3/6th Battalion ===
The 3/6th Bn was formed at Belle Vue Barracks on 25 March 1915. It trained and supplied drafts to the 1/6th and 2/6th Bns. On 8 April 1916, while at Clipstone Camp in Nottinghamshire, it became 6th Reserve Bn, West Yorkshires, and then was absorbed into the 5th Reserve Bn West Yorkshires in the West Riding Reserve Brigade at Clipstone on 1 September 1916.

== Interwar ==
The TF reformed on 7 February 1920, and the 6th Bn West Yorkshires reformed as soon as the cadre was disembodied on 30 March. The TF was reorganised as the Territorial Army in 1921, with 6th Bn West Yorkshires once again in 146th (1st West Riding) Bde of 49th (West Riding Division). Bradford Grammar School Cadet Corps was affiliated to the battalion.

=== Anti-Aircraft conversion ===
In the 1930s, the increasing need for anti-aircraft (AA) defence for Britain's cities was addressed by converting a number of TA infantry battalions into searchlight (S/L) battalions of the Royal Engineers (RE). In 1937 the 6th West Yorkshires was selected for conversion, becoming 49th (The West Yorkshire Regiment) Anti-Aircraft Battalion, Royal Engineers on 1 October, with HQ and 395–398 AA Companies based at Belle Vue Barracks. It was assigned to 31st (North Midland) AA Brigade, originally part of 2nd AA Division, but in the process of transferring to a new 7th AA Division forming to defend Yorkshire and the North Midlands when war broke out in 1939.

== World War II ==
=== Mobilisation ===
90 cm 'Projector Anti-Aircraft', displayed at Fort Nelson, Portsmouth

The TA's AA units were mobilised on 23 September 1938 during the Munich Crisis, with units manning their emergency positions within 24 hours, even though many did not yet have their full complement of men or equipment. The emergency lasted three weeks, and they were stood down on 13 October. In February 1939, the existing AA defences came under the control of a new Anti-Aircraft Command. In June, as international tensions increased, a partial mobilisation of TA units was begun in a process known as 'couverture', whereby each AA unit did a month's tour of duty in rotation to man selected AA and searchlight positions. On 24 August, ahead of the declaration of war, AA Command was fully mobilised at its war stations.

=== Phoney war ===
On the outbreak of war, 49th AA Bn was still part of 31st (North Midland) AA Brigade, covering the West Riding in 7th AA Division. 397 AA Company deployed as part of 39 AA Bde, which covered the area between the Humber Estuary and Sheffield.

During the Phoney War period, AA Command was desperate for men and equipment to meet its huge commitments. When the War Office released the first intakes of Militiamen to the Command in early 1940, most were found to be in low physical categories and without training. 31 AA Bde reported that out of 1,000 recruits sent for duty, "50 had to be discharged immediately because of serious medical defects, another 20 were judged to be mentally deficient and a further 18 were unfit to do any manual labour such as lifting ammunition." Fitness and training was greatly improved by the time Britain's AA defences were seriously tested during the Battle of Britain and Blitz.

=== Blitz ===
On 1 August 1940, the RE's AA units were transferred to the Royal Artillery (RA): the battalion became the 49th (The West Yorkshire Regiment) Searchlight Regiment, RA, and the AA companies were termed S/L Batteries.

As the Blitz on British cities intensified in the autumn, AA Command created new formations, and 31st AA Bde moved to a new 10th AA Division, though it was still defending the industrial towns of West Yorkshire. For example, Sheffield was badly hit on 12 and 15 December, and Leeds on nine occasions, particularly on the night of 14/15 March 1941.

=== Home defence ===
Formation sign of 10 AA Division

49th S/L Regiment remained in the defences of the North of England for most of the war. The regiment supplied a cadre of experienced officers and men to 234th S/L Training Rgt at Carlisle where it provided the basis for a new 549 S/L Bty formed on 16 January 1941. This battery later joined a newly-forming 91st S/L Rgt. 397 S/L Battery transferred away to 63rd (Queen's) S/L Rgt in the London area in January 1942, formally joining that regiment on 23 March. When AA Command was reorganised in the autumn of 1942, 10th AA Division was absorbed by a new 5 AA Group. In August 1943 49th S/L Rgt moved to 50 Light AA Bde.

=== North West Europe ===
Although it remained within 5 AA Group, 50 LAA Bde was earmarked for a role in the Allied invasion of Normandy (Operation Overlord), with searchlight regiments specially trained to defend the bridgehead. These regiments avoided the worst of the manpower reductions being forced on AA Command, but on 1 June 1944 E Troop of 398 Bty transferred to be E Trp of 441 Bty in 64th S/L Rgt. After D-Day on 6 June 1944, 50 LAA Bde and 49th S/L Rgt were poised to cross to Normandy.

However, the searchlights of 50 LAA Bde were not required by 21st Army Group, and remained with Home Forces in England. By the latter part of 1944, the German Luftwaffe was suffering from such shortages of pilots, aircraft and fuel that serious aerial attacks on the United Kingdom could be discounted. The War Office began reorganising surplus AA units in Home Forces into infantry battalions for duties in the rear areas. In October, 49th S/L Rgt was one of the units selected for conversion, and redesignated 49th (The West Yorkshire Regiment) Garrison Regiment, RA.

Meanwhile, 21st Army Group was suffering a severe manpower shortage in North West Europe, particularly among the infantry. In early 1945 the War Office accelerated the conversion of surplus artillery into infantry units, primarily for line of communication and occupation duties, thereby releasing trained infantry for frontline service. 49 Garrison Regiment was redesignated again, becoming 601 (The West Yorkshire Regiment) Infantry Regiment, RA in February. It went to North West Europe and did Line of Communication duty with Second Army, including service in Antwerp while that city was under attack by V-1 flying bombs.

After VE Day, the regiment became part of 306 Infantry Brigade (the former 55 AA Brigade) on occupation duties. The regiment was placed in suspended animation on 4 February 1946.

== Postwar ==
When the TA was reconstituted in 1947, the regiment was reformed at Bradford as 584th (Mobile) (The West Yorkshire Regiment) Heavy Anti-Aircraft Regiment, RA, equipped with heavy AA guns in 69 AA Bde (the former 43 AA Bde at Leeds). On 1 January 1954 it was re-equipped with light AA guns and altered its title accordingly.

In March 1955, AA Command was disbanded and there was a major reduction in the number of AA units in the TA. 584 LAA Regiment amalgamated with the Bradford-based 270 (West Riding) Field Regiment, RA, to form 370 (West Riding) Field Regiment, in which the former 584 Rgt formed Q (The West Yorkshire Regiment) Battery. The combined regiment reverted to the number 270 in 1960 and the following year merged with 269 (West Riding) Field Regiment at Leeds to form 249 (The West Riding Artillery) Field Regiment, when its West Yorkshire Regiment lineage ended.

== Insignia ==
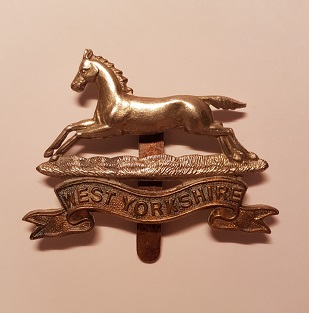
West Yorkshire Regiment cap badge

During World War II the regiment wore an insignia on battledress consisting of a White Rose of York with green sepals on a rectangle divided horizontally buff over red (the regimental colours). In 1951 the regiment was officially authorised to wear the West Yorkshire Regiment cap badge as an arm badge, a custom continued in Q Bty of 370 Rgt.

== Honorary Colonels ==
The following officers served as Honorary Colonel of the unit:

- Lt-Col H.S. Hirst, CB, former CO, 1890–99.
- Col J.G. Wilson, CB, VD, appointed 16 August 1899, k in South Africa during Second Boer War.
- Brigadier General Edward Stevenson Browne, VC, CB, appointed 3 December 1902.
- Col Sir George Helme (later Mashiter), KCB, CMG, former commander of West Yorkshire Brigade, appointed 1 October 1907.
- Brevet Colonel H.L. Anderton, TD, former CO, appointed 23 November 1932.

== Memorials ==
A three-light stained glass window commemorating the dead of the 6th West Yorkshires was unveiled in Bradford Cathedral on 17 July 1921. The Colours of the 6th West Yorkshires, originally presented to the battalion on 19 June 1909, were laid up in Bradford Cathedral on 26 May 1953.

== Online sources ==
- British Army units from 1945 on
- British Military History
- Clayton History Group
- The Drill Hall Project
- Great War Forum
- Imperial War Museum, War Memorials Register
- Landships: British Tank Actions of the First World War
- London Gazette
- The Long, Long Trail
- Orders of Battle at Patriot Files
- Royal Artillery 1939–1945
- Graham Watson, The Territorial Army 1947
