= 307th Infantry Brigade =

- Active: Formed 22 January 1945
- Country: United Kingdom
- Branch: British Army
- Type: Infantry Brigade
- Role: Lines of Communication

307th Infantry Brigade (307 Bde) was a formation of the British Army organised from surplus Royal Artillery (RA) personnel retrained as infantry towards the end of the Second World War.

== Origin ==
By the end of 1944, the 21st Army Group was suffering a severe manpower shortage, particularly among its infantry units. In January 1945, the War Office began to reorganise surplus anti-aircraft and coastal artillery regiments in the UK into infantry battalions, primarily for line of communication and occupation duties in North West Europe, thereby releasing trained infantry for frontline service. The 307th was one of seven brigades formed from these new units.

== Composition ==
The 307th Infantry Brigade was formed on 22 January 1945 by conversion of the 59 AA Bde's headquarters within 2 Anti-Aircraft Group. The brigade had previously formed part of the Orkney and Shetland Defences (OSDEF) of Anti-Aircraft Command. It was commanded by Brigadier H.H.V. Christie initially, although he was later replaced by Brigadier W.W. Allison who filled the role from 1 March to 26 May 1945 until handing over to Brigadier L.K. Lockhart. The brigade consisted of the following Territorial Army RA units:

- 625th Infantry Regiment Royal Artillery – formed from the 95th Light Anti-Aircraft Regiment RA (TA).
- 626th Infantry Regiment, Royal Artillery – formed from the 97th Light Anti-Aircraft Regiment RA (TA). (Transferred to 306th Infantry Brigade on 10 March 1945.)
- 631st (Kent) Infantry Regiment, Royal Artillery – formed from the 29th (Kent) Searchlight Regiment RA (TA).
- 623rd Infantry Regiment, Royal Artillery – formed from the 67th Light Anti-Aircraft Regiment RA (TA). (Transferred from 306th Infantry Brigade on 10 March 1945.)

== Service ==
After infantry training, including a short period attached to Southern Command, the 307th Bde landed on the Continent on 23 April 1945, and came under the orders of the 21st Army Group, later of HQ Supreme Headquarters Allied Expeditionary Force (SHAEF).
