= List of British special service brigades of the Second World War =

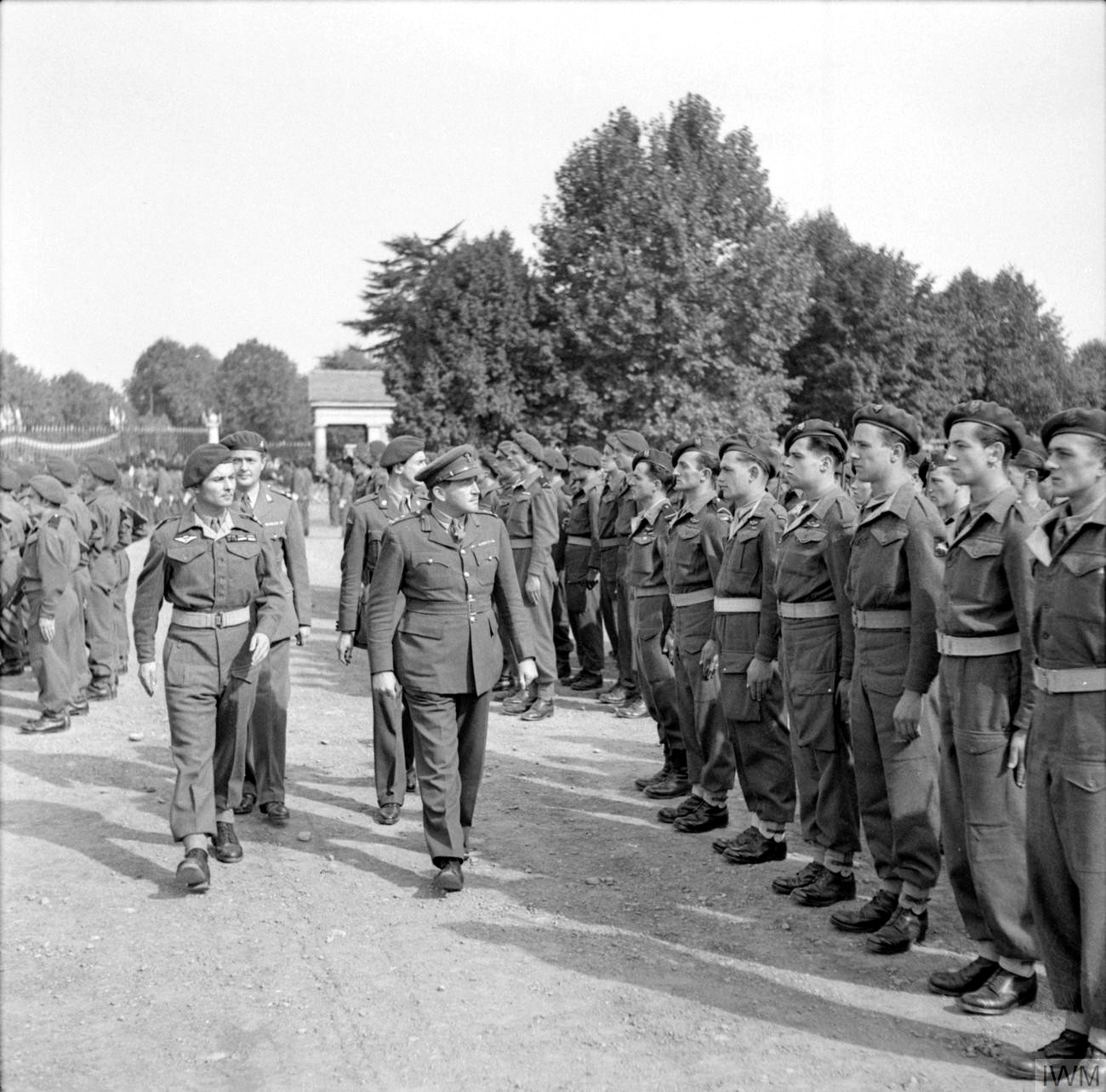
During the Second World War, British brigades were commanded by a brigadier. Here Brigadier Mike Calvert (centre, walking towards camera) reviews the French contingent of the Special Air Service Troops brigade, following the end of the war and prior to it being disbanded.

In mid-1940, after the defeat of the World War II Allies in the Battle of France, the British Army began raising a raiding force. The army intended that these units would conduct hit and run attacks on German-occupied Europe, showcasing the British Army's still-vibrant offensive capability. At that time, most of the army was engaged in defensive duties protecting the UK; its raid ability was thought to boost public morale. These raiding forces were called "commandos." Toward the end of 1940, the commando force had grown to a brigade-level command size and was re-organised to coordinate its structure and management.

As the war progressed, more commando units were formed; eventually their role transformed from raiding into acting as assault troops and light infantry, resulting in a need to reorganise the force, expanding the single brigade to four. The four commando brigades would spearhead British Army attacks in Northwest Europe, Italy, and Burma. The expansion also led to the creation of the Special Air Service (SAS). By 1944, SAS had also grown to a brigade-level command while maintaining its raiding role. Although never operating as a single entity, SAS units operated deep behind enemy lines, generally isolated from one another. All five brigades were maintained through the end of the war and were disbanded at the conclusion of hostilities.

== Background ==
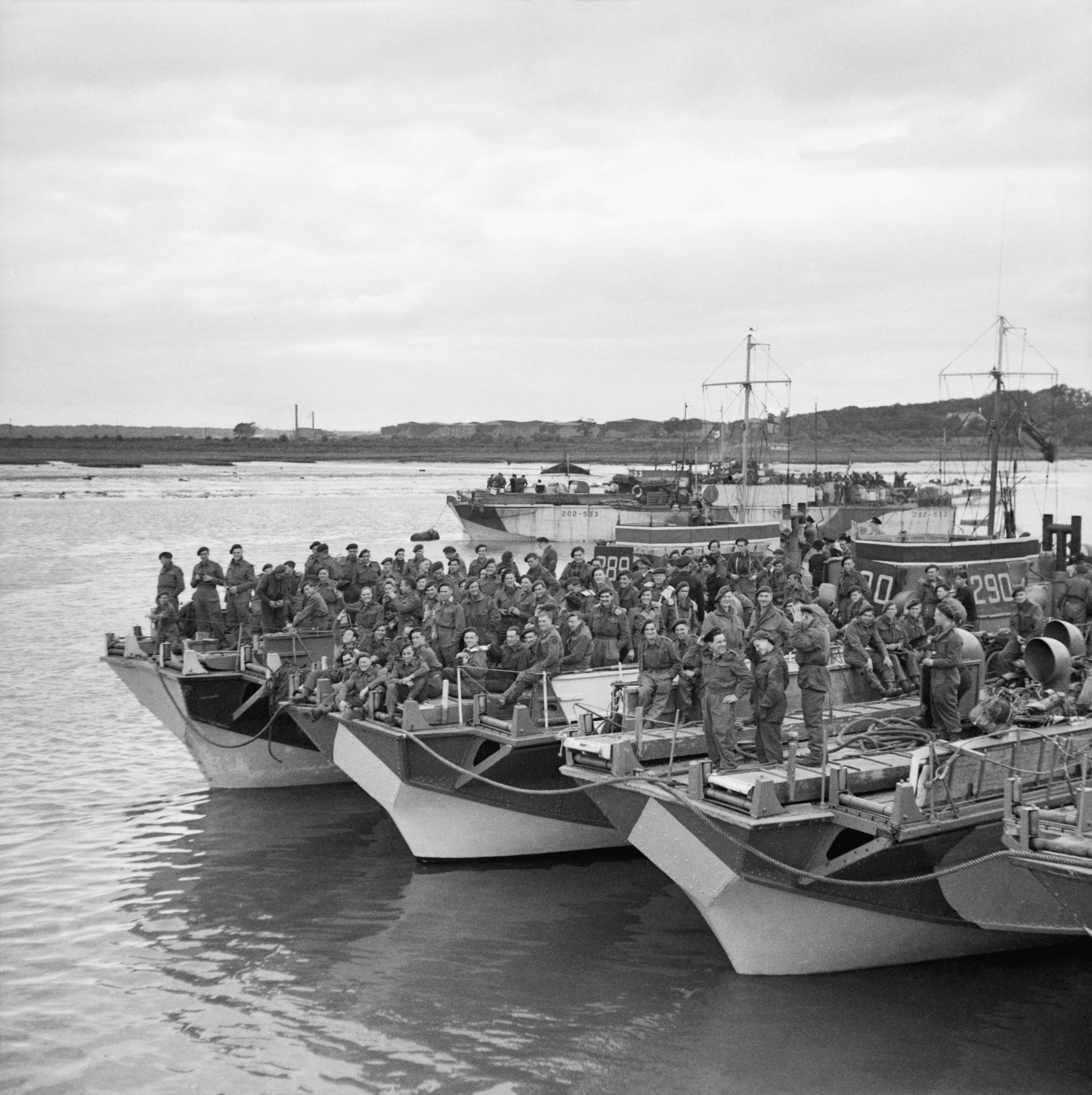
more Elements of the 1st Special Service Brigade standing aboard Landing Craft Infantry, 3 June, prior to the Allied invasion of Normandy.

In June 1940, following the Allied defeat in the Battle of France and the British military's evacuation to the United Kingdom, British Prime Minister Winston Churchill requested a new force be raised to conduct hit and run raids on German-occupied Europe. Launching raids was seen as a way to demonstrate the British ability to remain on the offensive while the bulk of its army maintained a defensive posture defending the UK. This offensive posture was also thought to boost public morale. The new volunteer force, dubbed "commandos" by Lieutenant-Colonel Dudley Clarke, conducted its first raid shortly after formation. Existing independent companies and new units of varying size were formed, with the intent that any force could be utilised as needed and would be capable of operating independently for a 24-hour period exclusively to conduct raids.

In November 1940, as the number of units increased and the need for more centralised control grew, the Special Service Brigade was formed. Five Special Service Battalions were formed by merging many of the small commando units and independent companies. Each battalion controlled two companies with ten troops of 50 men. Not all commandos were assigned to the brigade. By February 1941, the new organization was deemed unsuccessful. Its unit sizes were too difficult to command and control during training and too unwieldy to fit aboard a small number of ships. A 1,000-man commando battalion was too large to travel in existing troop transporters, e.g., multiple Landing Craft Assault vessels were required to ferry a single company. This caused cohesion issues which limited the ability to assign a battalion to a single task as a complete unit. As a result, the brigade was reorganised. The term "special service battalion" was dropped, and each unit was renamed "commando." Following the reorganization, the brigade commanded six commandos each of six 65-man troops. The reorganization allowed for one commando to be housed aboard one to two ships, depending on type, and fewer landing craft were needed to ferry the troops ashore.

Insignia worn by all commando units.

During 1941 and 1942, additional commandos were formed from British personnel as well as European exile volunteers. Some of these units were also assigned to the Special Service Brigade. By 1942, the role of the commandos had expanded to include spearheading large-scale amphibious attacks. The units were also employed in greater numbers and engaged in more prolonged combat than the originally envisioned limited raids. By October 1943, the commandos had been further reorganised to meet this new role; the Special Service Brigade was superseded by the Special Service Group. This was followed by the formation of four new Special Service Brigades, each composed of four army and Royal Marines commandos. Although these brigades conducted some small raids, they were largely committed to an assault or light infantry role. On 6 December 1944, the term "Special Service" was dropped from the brigade titles and was replaced with "Commando". "Special Service" had negative connotations with the troops, as it was abbreviated "SS" and associated with the German Schutzstaffel, or SS. In 1946, following the end of hostilities, the brigades were disbanded along with the army commandos and most of the Royal Marine commandos. This left the 3 Commando Brigade for peacetime service, continuing the commando legacy.

The Pegasus flash

In 1941, the Special Air Service (SAS) was formed out of the commando forces based in Mediterranean and Middle East theatre. Initially known as L Detachment, SAS grew in size and conducted behind-the-lines operations against Axis forces within the theatre. In January 1944, Special Air Service Troops, a brigade-sized formation with a total strength of about 2,000 men, was founded with two British regiments, two French regiments, and a Belgian squadron. The brigade was based within the UK which required the British element to be transported from the Mediterranean back home. The brigade adopted the maroon beret of the British airborne forces, and the British troops had to discard their beige berets. Like the UK contingent, the French and Belgian elements also wore the British airborne Pegasus shoulder flash. The brigade was not intended to be used as a cohesive force akin to the Commando Brigades; individual SAS units were deployed separately. The brigade's first assignment was to support the Allied invasion of German-occupied France by landing deep within the country to establish bases, raid and sabotage German positions, and liaise with the French Resistance. While elements of the brigade were operating in France, others SAS units were dropped behind the lines in Italy to work alongside the Italian resistance movement. In October 1945, the Special Air Service Troops brigade and its constituent units were disbanded.

== Special Service brigades ==
List of special service brigades
Formation name	Date formed	Wartime date ceased to exist	Location(s) served	Notable campaign(s)	Notes	Source(s)
Special Service Brigade	1 November 1940	November 1943	UK, Norway, France	Raids on the Atlantic Wall	The Special Service Brigade was formed on 1 November to command the various special service battalions that had been raised during the year. In 1941, the special service battalions were retitled as commandos. In November 1943, following the expansion of the commando forces, the Special Service Brigade was replaced by HQ SS Group, which would control four new brigades that were formed.	
1st Special Service Brigade	November 1943	—	Italy, UK, France, Belgium, Netherlands, Germany	Allied invasion of Sicily, Normandy, Allied advance from Paris to the Rhine, Western Allied invasion of Germany	Redesignated as 1 Commando Brigade, on 6 December 1944.	
2nd Special Service Brigade	November 1943	—	Italy, Yugoslavia, Albania	Italy, Adriatic	Redesignated as 2 Commando Brigade, on 6 December 1944.	
3rd Special Service Brigade	November 1943	—	Italy, British India, Burma	Allied invasion of Sicily, Burma	Redesignated as 3 Commando Brigade, on 6 December 1944. The brigade was withdrawn to British India in 1945, to prepare for operations to liberate British Malaya. But the war ended so this operation did not occur. With the surrender of Japan, the brigade sailed to re-establish British rule in Hong Kong.	
4th Special Service Brigade	November 1943	—	UK, France, Belgium, Netherlands, Germany	Normandy, Allied advance from Paris to the Rhine, Scheldt	Redesignated as 4 Commando Brigade, on 6 December 1944. After the fighting in the Scheldt, the brigade remained in the area until after the German surrender. It then entered Germany for occupation duties, and was subsequently withdrawn to the UK.	
Special Air Service Troops	7 January 1944	—	UK, France, Italy, Belgium, Netherlands, Germany, Norway	France, Italy, Western Allied invasion of Germany	The brigade did not fight as a cohesive force, instead the it oversaw the control of various units that were engaged in operations across Europe. With the exception of May through August 1945 when the brigade HQ moved to Norway, the HQ remained in the UK and ended the war there.	

== See also ==
- British Army during the Second World War
- List of British deception formations in World War II, for the 104th Special Service (Commando) Brigade
- British Commando operations during the Second World War
- Chindits, also known as Special Force
