= List of British airborne brigades of the Second World War =

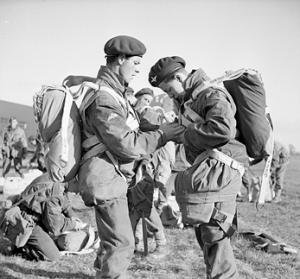
British paratroopers during training

Impressed by the German airborne force during the 1940 Battle of France, the British Prime Minister, Winston Churchill, ordered the creation of a paratrooper force of 5,000 men. The success of Operation Colossus, a small scale commando raid, prompted further expansion of this force, and resulted in an additional requirement for a glider force of 10,000 men to be created. The recruitment for the size of this force took through to 1943, by which time two divisions had been formed. The airborne division was to comprise three brigades: two parachute brigades, each with three battalions from the Parachute Regiment, and an airlanding brigade with three infantry battalions. The first parachute battalions were formed from volunteers from across the British military. As the airborne force grew, infantry battalions were selected to be converted into parachute battalions. The men were invited to volunteer for parachute service, or assigned to a new unit. The new battalions were then brought up to strength from volunteers from other units. The airlanding battalions came from existing infantry units that had been converted into this new role, and the soldiers did not have the ability to opt-out. The latter were flown into battle via gliders, while the former parachuted in.

== Airlanding ==
Airlanding brigades
Formation name	Existing or date created	Date ceased to exist	Location(s) served	Notable campaign(s)	Division(s) mostly associated with	Notes	Source(s)
1st Airlanding Brigade	10 December 1941	N/A	UK, Tunisia, Italy, Netherlands, Norway	Tunisian, Italian, Arnhem	1st Airborne	The brigade was formed by the re-designation of the 31st Independent Brigade Group, and was initially known as the 1st Airlanding Brigade Group. On 10 March 1943, the brigade was renamed the 1st Airlanding Brigade. The brigade ended the war in the UK.	
6th Airlanding Brigade	6 May 1943	N/A	UK, France, Germany	Normandy, Western Allied invasion of Germany	6th Airborne	The brigade ended the war based in the UK	
14th Airlanding Brigade	1 November 1944	N/A	British India	did not see combat	44th Indian Airborne	The brigade was formed by the re-designation of the headquarters of the 14th Infantry Brigade. The brigade ended the war in British India.	

== Parachute ==
Parachute brigades
Formation name	Existing or date created	Date ceased to exist	Location(s) served	Notable campaign(s)	Division(s) mostly associated with	Notes	Source(s)
1st Parachute Brigade	5 September 1941	N/A	UK, Tunisia, Italy, Netherlands	Tunisian, Allied invasion of Sicily, Arnhem	1st Airborne	Following heavy losses during the Battle of Arnhem, the brigade was merged with the 4th Parachute Brigade from September through to November 1944. The brigade ended the war based in the UK.	
2nd Parachute Brigade	17 July 1942	N/A	UK, Tunisia, Italy, Greece, France	Tunisian, Italian, Southern France	1st Airborne, 2nd New Zealand, 8th Indian	On 17 November 1943, the brigade was re-designated as the 2nd Independent Parachute Brigade Group. Between 18 September and 6 October 1944, the brigade was temporarily renamed Force 140 while it operated in Greece. It ended the war based in the UK.	
3rd Parachute Brigade	7 November 1942	N/A	UK, France, Germany	Normandy, Western Allied invasion of Germany	1st Airborne, 6th Airborne	The brigade was formed by the re-designation of the 223rd Independent Infantry Brigade. It ended the war based in the UK.	
4th Parachute Brigade	1 December 1942	10 December 1944	Egypt, Palestine, Italian-Libya, Tunisia, Italy, Netherlands, UK	Italian, Arnhem	1st Airborne	The brigade was formed in Egypt from British troops based there. Following heavy losses during the Battle of Arnhem, the brigade was merged with the 1st Parachute Brigade. It was disbanded on 10 December 1944.	
5th Parachute Brigade	1 June 1943	N/A	UK, France, Germany, British India	Normandy, Western Allied invasion of Germany	6th Airborne	The brigade was formed by the re-designation of the 72nd Independent Infantry Brigade. It ended the war in British India.	
Special Air Service Troops	7 January 1944	N/A	UK, France, Italy, Belgium, Netherlands, Germany, Norway	France, Italy, Western Allied invasion of Germany	N/A	The brigade contained British, Belgian, and French Special Air Service units. It did not fight as a cohesive force, instead the it oversaw the control of various units that were engaged in various operations across Europe. With the exception of May through August 1945 when the brigade HQ moved to Norway, the HQ remained in the UK and ended the war there.	

== See also ==
- British Army during the Second World War
- Chindits, who also used parachute and glider insertions
- List of British deception formations in World War II, for brigades that were created as part of deception divisions
- List of Indian Army Brigades in World War II, for British Indian Army airborne formations
