= 306th Infantry Brigade =

- Active: Formed 22 January 1945
- Country: United Kingdom
- Branch: British Army
- Type: Infantry Brigade
- Role: Lines of Communication
- Part of: 21st Army Group

306th Infantry Brigade (306 Bde) was a British Army formation organised towards the end of the Second World War from surplus Royal Artillery (RA) personnel who had been retrained as infantry.

== Origin ==
By the end of 1944, 21st Army Group was suffering a severe manpower shortage, particularly among the infantry. In January 1945, the War Office began to reorganise surplus anti-aircraft and coastal artillery regiments in the UK into infantry battalions, primarily for lines of communication and occupation duties in North West Europe, thereby releasing trained infantry for frontline service. 306th was one of seven brigades formed from these new units.

== Composition ==
306th Infantry Brigade was formed on 22 January 1945 by the conversion of Headquarters 55th Light AA Bde, which was part of 2 Anti-Aircraft Group (2 AA Group). It was commanded by Brigadier W. R. Harvey and comprised the following Territorial Army RA units:

- 623rd Infantry Regiment, Royal Artillery formed by 67th Light Anti-Aircraft Regiment RA (TA). (to 307th Infantry Brigade, 11 March 1945)
- 628th Infantry Regiment, Royal Artillery formed by 128th Light Anti-Aircraft Regiment, RA (previously 87th Searchlight Regiment RA (TA)). (to 21st Army Group Lines of Communication, 8 May 1945)
- 636th (Hampshire) Infantry Regiment, Royal Artillery formed by 48th (Hampshire) Searchlight Regiment RA (TA), itself originally Hampshire Fortress Engineers, RE (to 21st Army Group Lines of Communication, 8 May 1945)
- 626th Infantry Regiment Royal Artillery formed by 97th Light Anti-Aircraft Regiment RA (TA). (from 307th Bde 10 March, to 21st Army Group Lines of Communication, 7 May 1945)
- 601st (West Riding Regiment) Infantry Regiment Royal Artillery formed by the 49th (West Yorkshire Regiment) Garrison Regiment RA (previously the 49th (West Yorkshire Regiment) Searchlight Regiment RA (TA), itself formed by 6th Battalion, West Yorkshire Regiment in 1937). (from 21st Army Group Lines of Communication, 8 May 1945)
- 608th Infantry Regiment Royal Artillery formed by 67th (Welch Regiment) Garrison Regiment RA (previously 67th (Welch Regiment) Searchlight Regiment RA (TA), itself formed from 6th (Glamorgan) Battalion. Welch Regiment in 1938). (from 21st Army Group Lines of Communication, 8 May 1945)
- 612th Infantry Regiment Royal Artillery formed by the 61st (South Lancashire Regiment) Garrison Regiment RA (itself formed from the 61st (South Lancashire Regiment) Searchlight Regiment RA (TA), previously 5th Battalion, South Lancashire Regiment). (from 1st Czechoslovak Armoured Brigade, 8 May 1945)

== Service ==
After infantry training, including a short period attached to Southern Command, 306 Bde came under the orders of 21st Army Group on 4 May 1945, and landed on the Continent three days later.
