= List of British infantry brigades of the Second World War (1–100) =

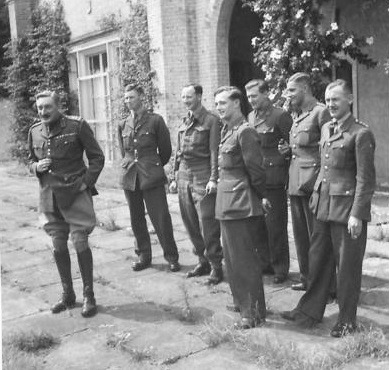
During the Second World War, British brigades were commanded by a brigadier. Here Brigadier Lionel Bootle-Wilbraham poses with some of the staff of the 126th Infantry Brigade.

During the Second World War, a British infantry brigade consisted of multiple battalions and was commanded by a brigadier. Generally, three infantry brigades would form an infantry division, although brigades could be used as independent formations in which case, they were usually assigned to a corps-level command to be utilised. Brigades were flexible formations and rarely maintained the same battalions. Likewise, brigades could be moved from division to division or higher-level commands, as the tactical or strategic need arose. Their role could also vary dramatically, from being a combat formation to becoming a training organisation. Over the course of the war, the British Army had 216 uniquely numbered or named brigade formations. However, not all existed at the same time, and several were formed by renaming or renumbering existing formations. This article focuses on all brigades numbered between 1 and 100. Those numbered above 100 or named, are located within their own list.

During the Second World War, the British Army was split between two branches: the regular army, made up of full-time professionals; and the Territorial Army (TA), which comprised part-time reservists. The TA was seen as the primary way to expand the size of the British military during a war. To do so, the existing TA formations, which were referred to as the first-line, would create a new formation based around a cadre of soldiers. The new formation, referred to as the second-line, would then be expanded until it reached full strength. The regular army also created new brigades when existing infantry battalions were grouped together. The expansion of British African regiments also saw the creation of many additional infantry brigades.

== Background ==
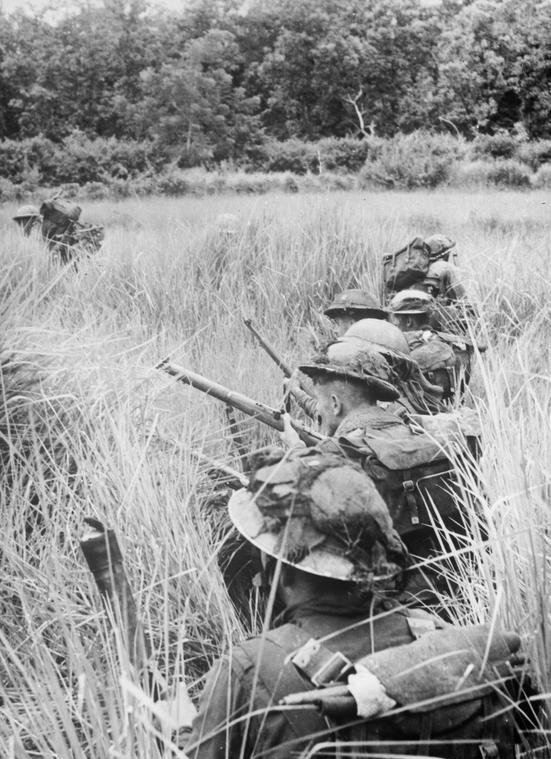
The infantry, the backbone of the British Army. Here, elements of the 29th Infantry Brigade prepare to go into action, during the Burma Campaign.

During the Second World War, the infantry was the backbone of the British Army. Within the British Army, the infantry was organised into regiments, however, these were administrative structures and not operational units. The fighting unit of an infantry regiment was the battalion, and a regiment could field numerous battalions. A brigade generally consisted of three infantry battalions commanded by a brigadier, and were around 2,500-men strong.

Brigades were not set formations, and their composition and role could change because of tactical or strategic demands. For example, the 9th Infantry Brigade contained the same three battalions throughout the course of the war. In contrast, the 16th Infantry Brigade had 17 different battalions under its command during the war. It was unusual for a brigade to consist solely of battalions from one regiment. From the list below, excluding the brigades raised in Africa, only the 35th (Queen's Royal Regiment (West Surrey)), the 53rd (Royal Norfolk Regiment), and the 61st Infantry Brigades (Rifle Brigade (The Prince Consort's Own)) contained more than one battalion from the same regiment. Of these, only the 35th maintained the battalions from one regiment throughout the course of the brigade's existence. A brigade could be an independent formation, answerable only to a high-level command, or one assigned to a division. Those assigned to divisions could be switched between formations depending on the strategic need. For example, the 9th and the 10th Infantry Brigades never left their respective divisions throughout the entire course of the war, whereas the 16th Infantry Brigade was assigned to seven different divisions, six corps-level commands, and three strategic commands. In combat, brigades were provided support from artillery, engineers, and other supporting arms as needed. Generally, these assets belonged to the higher formations that the brigade belonged to.

The British Army was split into two branches: the regular army, which numbered 224,000 men with a reserve of 173,700 at the start of the war, and the part-time Territorial Army (TA), which numbered 438,100 with a reserve of around 20,750 men. The main goal of the regular army, built largely around battalion-size units, was to maintain the peace and defend the British Empire. David Fraser, a historian and a former general, argued that during the inter-war period, the British Army did not field a force of infantry brigades and divisions; those that officially existed, did so only on paper. While battalions were organised into brigades, they were dispersed and were deficient in artillery, communication, engineer, logistical, and transportation assets. In the event of war, brigades ready and equipped to fight as part of a division would need to be assembled from the available battalions, while other forces required for brigades and divisions would have to be raised. At the outset of war, the regular army had 24 infantry brigades. The majority of them were stationed within the UK, although there were six based in the Middle East, one garrisoned in Malta, and one each based in West Africa, British Malaya, and Hong Kong. The British Army also increased the recruitment within their African regiments, in particular the Nigeria Regiment, the Gold Coast Regiment, and the King's African Rifles, which resulted in numerous brigades being formed in east (Kenya, Northern Rhodesia, Nyasaland, Tanganyika, and Uganda), and west Africa. Over the course of the war, 140 regular army brigades would be raised, although they would not all exist at the same time, and many were re-designated from one number or name to another.

The TA was intended to be the primary method of expanding the number of formations available to the British Army. However, during the inter-war period, the British government reduced the funding and size of the TA. By 1936, they had concluded the TA could not be modernised or equipped for a European war over the following three-year period, and therefore delayed further funding. Following the German occupation of the remnants of the Czechoslovak state in March 1939, the TA was ordered to be doubled in size. At the beginning of 1939, the TA had 35 infantry brigades. The existing formations, termed the first-line, were ordered to create a second formation using a cadres of trained personnel. The new formations were termed the second-line, and the process was termed "duplicating". (Note: All TA recruits were required to take the general service obligation: if the British Government decided, territorial soldiers could be deployed overseas for combat. (This avoided the complications of the First World War-era Territorial Force, whose members were not required to leave Britain unless they volunteered for overseas service.) The plan was for the first-line formations to recruit over their establishments (aided by improvements in conditions of service) and then form a new brigade from cadres around which the new formation could be expanded.) By the outbreak of the war, some of these second-line brigades had been formed while others were still being created. By the end of 1939, the TA had increased to 32 first-Line and 32 second-line infantry brigades.

During the 1939–1940 period, each brigade of the British Expeditionary Force was assigned a company of nine French 25 mm Hotchkiss anti-tank guns. After the Battle of France and the Dunkirk evacuation, additional brigade anti-tank companies were formed and equipped with the Ordnance QF 2-pounder anti-tank gun. Over the course of the following year, these companies were disbanded. The British Army implemented lessons learnt from the battle of France. This included brigades, in the UK, being reorganised into brigade groups, which involved attaching artillery, anti-aircraft guns, anti-tank guns, machine guns, and engineers to them. This change was then implemented in brigades overseas. Brigades, which were attached to a division and organised in this fashion, compromised the division's ability to centralise and concentrate artillery fire to support the infantry brigades. After training exercises in the UK demonstrated the weakness of these formations, those based within the UK were reorganised as regular brigades and the additional units reassigned back to being divisional assets. These groups, due to a lack of firepower and not being concentrated with other formations, were engaged in several one-sided affairs against Axis divisional size forces and defeated.

== Infantry brigades ==
List of infantry brigades numbered 1 to 100
Formation name	Existing or date created	Date ceased to exist	Location(s) served	Notable campaign(s)	Branch	Division(s) mostly associated with	Notes	Source(s)
1st (East Africa) Infantry Brigade	31 August 1939	18 October 1940	East Africa	did not see combat	Regular Army	1st (African)	The brigade was formed when the King's African Rifles were expanded, and was recruited from the British East Africa colonies. On 18 October 1940, the brigade was redesignated as the 21st (East Africa) Infantry Brigade.	
1st Gibraltar Brigade	13 March 1941	N/A	Gibraltar	did not see combat	Regular Army	N/A	The brigade was formed from British forces based in Gibraltar, and ended the war there.	
1st Infantry Brigade (Guards)	Existing	N/A	UK, France, Belgium, Tunisia, Italy	Battle of France, Tunisia, Italy	Regular Army	1st Infantry, 6th Armoured, 78th Infantry	On 11 April 1942, the brigade was redesignated as the 1st Independent Brigade Group (Guards), and reverted to its prior title on 8 August 1942. The brigade ended the war in the UK.	
1st London Infantry Brigade	Existing	28 November 1940	UK	did not see combat	First-Line Territorial Army	1st London	On 28 November 1940, the brigade was redesignated as the 167th (London) Infantry Brigade.	
1st (Malta) Infantry Brigade	14 July 1942	1 April 1943	Malta, Egypt	Siege of Malta	Regular Army	N/A	The brigade was formed when the Southern Infantry Brigade, based in Malta, was redesignated. On 1 April 1943, the brigade was redesignated as the 231st Infantry Brigade.	
1st Malaya Infantry Brigade	Existing	14 February 1942	British Malaya	Malaya, Battle of Singapore	Regular Army	N/A	Entitled the Malaya Infantry Brigade at the start of the war, it was redesignated the 1st Malaya Infantry Brigade on 14 September 1940. It was a mixture of British regular forces, based in British Malaya, and locally recruited forces. Japan captured it after the Battle of Singapore.	
1st Sudan Defence Force Brigade	9 May 1942	11 July 1942	Sudan, Egypt	did not see combat	Regular Army	N/A	Formed and recruited in Sudan. On 11 July 1942, for administrative and deception purposes, the brigade was redesignated as a division of the Sudan Defence Force, officially known as the 12th Division SDF. The brigade then ceased to exist.	
1st (West Africa) Infantry Brigade	3 October 1939; 4 September 1941	18 June 1940; N/A	Nigeria, East Africa, West Africa, British India, Burma	Burma	Regular Army	82nd (West Africa)	The brigade was formed when the Nigeria Regiment was expanded, and was recruited from Colonial Nigeria. During June 1940, it was briefly redesignated as the 3rd (Nigeria) Infantry Brigade, before it was redesignated as the 23rd (Nigeria) Infantry Brigade. On 4 September 1941, the brigade was reformed when the 23rd (Nigeria) Infantry Brigade was redesignated. It ended the war in Burma.	
2nd (East Africa) Infantry Brigade	19 September 1939	16 October 1940	East Africa	did not see combat	Regular Army	2nd (African)	The brigade was formed when the King's African Rifles were expanded, and was recruited from the British East Africa colonies. On 18 October 1940, the brigade was redesignated as the 22nd (East Africa) Infantry Brigade.	
2nd Gibraltar Brigade	24 April 1941	1 December 1943	Gibraltar	did not see combat	Regular Army	N/A	The brigade was formed from British forces based in Gibraltar. On 1 December 1943, it was redesignated as the 28th Infantry Brigade.	
2nd Infantry Brigade	Existing	N/A	UK, France, Belgium, Tunisia, Italy, Palestine, Syria	Battle of France, Tunisia, Pantelleria, Italy	Regular Army	1st Infantry	The brigade ended the war in Palestine.	
2nd London Infantry Brigade	Existing	28 November 1940	UK	did not see combat	First-Line Territorial Army	1st London	On 28 November 1940, the brigade was redesignated as the 168th (London) Infantry Brigade.	
2nd (Malta) Infantry Brigade	14 July 1942	1 April 1943	Malta	Siege of Malta	Regular Army	N/A	The brigade was formed when the Northern Infantry Brigade, based in Malta, was redesignated. On 1 April 1943, the brigade was redesignated as the 232nd Infantry Brigade.	
2nd Malaya Infantry Brigade	8 September 1940	14 February 1942	British Malaya	Malaya, Battle of Singapore	Regular Army	N/A	The brigade was a mixture of British regular forces and British Indian Army battalions, which were based in British Malaya. It was captured by the Japanese after the Battle of Singapore.	
2nd Sudan Defence Force Brigade	1 August 1943	N/A	Sudan, Eritrea	Internal security unit	Regular Army	N/A	Formed and recruited in Sudan. It ended the war based in Eritrea.	
2nd (West Africa) Infantry Brigade	Existing; 1 December 1941	18 October 1940; N/A	Gold Coast, East Africa, West Africa, British India, Burma	Burma	Regular Army	82nd (West Africa)	The brigade was formed after the expansion of the Gold Coast Regiment. For a short period, it was initially known as the 4th Gold Coast Infantry Brigade. It was recruited from the Gold Coast colony. It was redesignated as the 24th Gold Coast Brigade on 18 October 1940. The brigade was reformed when the 24th Gold Coast Brigade was redesignated. It ended the war in Burma.	
3rd Infantry Brigade	Existing	N/A	UK, France, Belgium, Tunisia, Italy, Palestine, Syria	Battle of France, Tunisia, Pantelleria, Italy	Regular Army	1st Infantry	The brigade ended the war in Palestine.	
3rd London Infantry Brigade	Existing	28 November 1940	UK	did not see combat	First-Line Territorial Army	1st London, 2nd London	On 28 November 1940, the brigade was redesignated as the 71st Infantry Brigade. Prior to the name change, it had been intended to redesignate the brigade as the 169th (London) Infantry Brigade.	
3rd (Malta) Infantry Brigade	14 July 1942	1 April 1943	Malta	Siege of Malta	Regular Army	N/A	The brigade was formed when the Central Infantry Brigade, based in Malta, was redesignated. On 1 April 1943, the brigade was redesignated as the 233rd Infantry Brigade.	
3rd (West Africa) Infantry Brigade	10 December 1940; 1 March 1945	30 November 1944; N/A	West Africa, British India, Burma	Burma	Regular Army	81st (West Africa)	The brigade was formed when the Nigeria Regiment was expanded, and was recruited from Colonial Nigeria. During May 1941, it was reorganised as a brigade group. In November 1943, the brigade was assigned to the Chindits and reorganised from an infantry brigade into a long range penetration unit. On 30 November 1944, the brigade was disbanded in British India. It was reformed, in British India, on 1 March 1945, and ended the war located there.	
4th Infantry Brigade	Existing	N/A	UK, France, Belgium, British India, Burma	Battle of France, Burma	Regular Army	2nd Infantry	The brigade ended the war in British India.	
4th London Infantry Brigade	Existing	21 November 1940	UK	did not see combat	Second-Line Territorial Army	2nd London	The brigade was formed as the duplicate of the 1st London Infantry Brigade. On 21 November 1940, the brigade was redesignated as the 140th (London) Infantry Brigade.	
4th (Malta) Infantry Brigade	14 July 1942	1 April 1943	Malta	Siege of Malta	Regular Army	N/A	The brigade when the Western Infantry Brigade, based in Malta, was redesignated. On 1 April 1943, the brigade was redesignated as the 234th Infantry Brigade.	
4th (West Africa) Infantry Brigade	24 February 1941	N/A	West Africa, British India, Burma	Burma	Regular Army	82nd (West Africa)	The brigade was formed when the Nigeria Regiment was expanded, and was recruited from Colonial Nigeria. It ended the war in Burma.	
5th (East Africa) Infantry Brigade	11 October 1940	18 October 1940	East Africa	did not see combat	Regular Army	N/A	The brigade was formed when the King's African Rifles were expanded, and was recruited from the British East Africa colonies. On 18 October 1940, the brigade was redesignated as the 25th (East Africa) Infantry Brigade.	
5th Guards Brigade	12 June 1945	N/A	Germany	did not see combat	Regular Army	Guards	The brigade was formed in Germany, after fighting in Europe had ended, when the 5th Guards Armoured Brigade was redesignated.	
5th Infantry Brigade	Existing	N/A	UK, France, Belgium, British India, Burma	Battle of France, Burma	Regular Army	2nd Infantry	The brigade ended the war in British India.	
5th London Infantry Brigade	Existing	21 November 1940	UK	did not see combat	Second-Line Territorial Army	2nd London	The brigade was formed as the duplicate of the 2nd London Infantry Brigade. On 21 November 1940, the brigade was redesignated as the 141st (London) Infantry Brigade.	
5th (West Africa) Infantry Brigade	3 March 1942	N/A	West Africa, British India, Burma	Burma	Regular Army	81st (West Africa)	The brigade was formed following the expansion of the Gold Coast Regiment, and was recruited from the Gold Coast colony. It ended the war in British India.	
6th Guards Brigade	17 June 1945	N/A	Germany	did not see combat	Regular Army	Guards	The brigade was formed in Germany, after the end of combat in Europe, when the 6th Guards Tank Brigade was redesignated.	
6th Infantry Brigade	Existing	N/A	UK, France, Belgium, British India, Burma	Battle of France, Burma	Regular Army	2nd Infantry, 14th Indian	On 1 November 1942, the brigade became an independent brigade group and then reverted to its prior role on 1 June 1943. On 19 April 1945, it again became an independent brigade, and ended the war in Burma.	
6th London Infantry Brigade	Existing	4 May 1940	UK	did not see combat	Second-Line Territorial Army	2nd London	The brigade was formed as the duplicate of the 3rd London Infantry Brigade. On 4 May 1940, the brigade was disbanded.	
6th (West Africa) Infantry Brigade	3 April 1941	N/A	West Africa, British India, Burma	Burma	Regular Army	81st (West Africa)	The brigade was formed in Sierra Leone, and recruited from the Sierra Leone Colony and Protectorate and Nigeria. In October 1941, the brigade was reorganised as a brigade group, and reverted to an infantry brigade in August 1944. It ended the war in British India.	
7th Infantry Brigade (Guards)	Existing	15 September 1941	UK, France, Belgium	Battle of France	Regular Army	3rd Infantry	On 15 September 1941, the brigade was redesignated as the Guards Support Group, part of the Guards Armoured Division.	
7th Infantry Brigade	8 December 1941	30 September 1944	UK	did not see combat	Regular Army	3rd Infantry, 9th Armoured, 47th Infantry (Reserve)	The brigade was formed when the 37th Independent Infantry Brigade was redesignated. On 30 September 1944, the brigade became a training formation.	
7th Motor Brigade	9 February 1942	20 July 1943	Egypt, Italian-Libya, Tunisia	Western Desert, Tunisia	Regular Army	1st Armoured, 7th Armoured	The formation was formed as a Brigade Group when the 7th Support Group was redesignated. On 24 August 1942, was reorganised as a regular brigade. On 20 July 1943, the brigade was redesignated as the 18th Lorried Infantry Brigade.	
7th (N Rhodesia) Infantry Brigade	18 September 1940	3 October 1940	East Africa	did not see combat	Regular Army	N/A	The brigade was formed when the Northern Rhodesia Regiment was expanded, and was recruited from Northern Rhodesia. On 3 October 1940, it was redesignated as the 27th (N Rhodesia) Infantry Brigade.	
7th (West Africa) Infantry Brigade	29 April 1942	26 February 1943	West Africa	did not see combat	Regular Army	N/A	The brigade was formed in Gambia Colony and Protectorate. It recruited from that colony and the Gold Coast. It was disbanded in West Africa on 26 February 1943.	
8th Infantry Brigade	Existing	N/A	UK, France, Belgium, Netherlands, Germany	Battle of France, Normandy, Advance from Paris to the Rhine, Invasion of Germany	Regular Army	3rd Infantry	The brigade ended the war in Germany.	
9th Infantry Brigade	Existing	N/A	UK, France, Belgium, Netherlands, Germany	Battle of France, Normandy, Advance from Paris to the Rhine, Invasion of Germany	Regular Army	3rd Infantry	The brigade ended the war in Germany.	
10th Infantry Brigade	Existing	N/A	UK, France, Belgium, Tunisia, Egypt, Italy, Greece	Battle of France, Tunisia, Italy	Regular Army	4th Infantry	The brigade ended the war in Greece.	
11th Infantry Brigade	Existing	N/A	UK, France, Belgium, Tunisia, Egypt, Italy, Austria	Battle of France, Tunisia, Allied invasion of Sicily, Italy	Regular Army	4th Infantry, 78th Infantry	The brigade ended the war in Austria.	
12th Infantry Brigade	Existing	N/A	UK, France, Belgium, Tunisia, Egypt, Italy, Greece	Battle of France, Tunisia, Italy	Regular Army	4th Infantry	The brigade ended the war in Greece.	
13th Infantry Brigade	Existing	N/A	UK, France, Belgium, Madagascar, India, Iraq, Iran, Syria, Egypt, Palestine, Italy, Netherlands, Germany	Battle of France, Battle of Madagascar, Allied invasion of Sicily, Italy, Invasion of Germany	Regular Army	5th Infantry	During the fighting in Madagascar, the formation operated as a brigade group. The brigade ended the war in Germany.	
14th Infantry Brigade	Existing; 30 October 1940	26 July 1940; 1 November 1944	Palestine, Egypt, Crete, Italian-Libya, Egypt, Syria, British India, Burma	Battle of Crete, Siege of Tobruk, Burma	Regular Army	4th Indian, 6th Indian, 6th Infantry, 8th Infantry, 70th Infantry	The brigade was disbanded in Egypt on 26 July 1940. It was then reformed on 30 October 1940. On 6 November, the brigade headquarters also became Headquarters British Troops in Crete (Creforce). This joint function ended on 27 April 1941. In September 1943, the brigade was assigned to the Chindits and reorganised from an infantry brigade into a long-range penetration unit. On 1 November 1944, it was redesignated as the 14th Airlanding Brigade.	
15th Infantry Brigade	Existing	N/A	UK, France, Norway, British India, Iraq, Iran, Syria, Egypt, Palestine, Belgium, Netherlands, Germany	Norwegian campaign, Allied invasion of Sicily, Italy, Invasion of Germany	Regular Army	5th Infantry	The brigade ended the war in Germany.	
16th Infantry Brigade	Existing	N/A	Palestine, Egypt, Italian-Libya, Egypt, Syria, Ceylon, British India, Burma	Western Desert, Burma	Regular Army	4th Indian, 6th Indian, 6th Infantry, 8th Infantry, 34th Indian, 70th Infantry	The brigade sailed to join other British forces based on Crete, but was recalled as a result of the Battle of Crete. In September 1943, the brigade was assigned to the Chindits and reorganised from an infantry brigade into a long-range penetration unit. In October 1944, it reverted to an infantry brigade and ended the war in British India.	
17th Infantry Brigade	3 October 1939	N/A	UK, France, Belgium, Madagascar, British India, Iraq, Iran, Egypt, Syria, Italy, Palestine, Italy, Netherlands, Germany	Battle of France, Battle of Madagascar, Allied invasion of Sicily, Italy, Invasion of Germany	Regular Army	5th Infantry	The formation operated as a brigade group during the fighting on Madagascar. The brigade ended the war in Germany.	
18th Infantry Brigade	Existing; 20 July 1943	18 May 1940; 1 January 1945	Egypt, Tunisia, Italy	Italy	Regular Army	N/A	The brigade was based in Egypt at the outbreak of the war, and was disbanded on 18 May 1940. A new 18th Lorried Infantry Brigade was formed on 20 July 1943, when the 7th Motor Brigade was redesignated. On 5 October 1943, the brigade was redesignated as the 18th Infantry Brigade. The brigade was disbanded, in Italy, on 1 January 1945.	
19th Infantry Brigade	Existing	3 September 1939	Palestine	did not see combat	Regular Army	7th Infantry	The brigade was disbanded and dispersed in Palestine on the outbreak of the war.	
20th Independent Infantry Brigade (Guards)	22 April 1940	15 September 1941	UK, France	Battle of Boulogne	Regular Army	N/A	On 15 September 1941, the brigade was redesignated as the 5th Guards Armoured Brigade.	
21st Infantry Brigade	24 July 1940	12 October 1940	Sudan	did not see combat	Regular Army	N/A	The brigade was formed from British troops based in Sudan. On 12 October 1940, it was redesignated as the 29th Indian Infantry Brigade and joined the British Indian Army.	
21st (East Africa) Infantry Brigade	18 October 1940	N/A	East Africa, Abyssinia, Ceylon, British India, Burma	East African campaign, Burma	Regular Army	1st South African, 11th (East Africa), 12th (African), 34th Indian	The brigade was formed when the 1st (East Africa) Infantry Brigade was redesignated. During January 1942, it was reorganised as a brigade group and reverted to an infantry brigade on 4 July 1943. It ended the war based in British India.	
22nd (East Africa) Infantry Brigade	18 October 1940	N/A	East Africa, Italian Somaliland, Abyssinia, Madagascar, Ceylon, Burma	East African campaign, Burma	Regular Army	11th (East Africa), 12th (African), 26th Indian, 82nd (West Africa)	The brigade was formed when the 2nd (East Africa) Infantry Brigade was redesignated. During December 1941, it was reorganised as a brigade group. It ended the war based in Burma.	
22nd Guards Brigade	20 March 1941	14 January 1942	Egypt, Italian-Libya	Western Desert	Regular Army	4th Indian, 6th Infantry, 7th Armoured	The brigade was formed when the 22nd Infantry Brigade was redesignated. On 14 January 1942, the brigade was redesignated as the 200th Guards Brigade.	
22nd Infantry Brigade	3 October 1939; 11 February 1941	2 September 1940; 20 March 1941	Egypt	did not see combat	Regular Army	6th Infantry, 7th Infantry	The brigade was formed in Egypt when the 29th Infantry Brigade was redesignated. On 24 June 1940, the brigade also became Headquarters lines of communication Sub-Area West. On 2 September 1940, the brigade was redesignated as Headquarters Matruh Fortress. The brigade was reformed on 11 February 1941 from troops based in Egypt, and redesignated the 22nd Guards Brigade on 20 March 1941.	
23rd Infantry Brigade	20 September 1939; 5 May 1941	15 August 1940; N/A	Egypt, Syria, Italian-Libya, British India, Burma	Siege of Tobruk, Burma	Regular Army	6th Infantry, 70th Infantry	Formed when the Canal Brigade was redesignated. It was disbanded on 15 August 1940, when it became Headquarters Sue Canal Sub-Area. On 5 May 1941, the brigade was reformed in Egypt. On 7 September 1943, the brigade was assigned to the Chindits and reorganised from an infantry brigade into a long-range penetration unit. On 1 April 1945, it reverted to an infantry brigade and ended the war in British India.	
23rd (Nigeria) Infantry Brigade	June 1940	4 September 1941	Nigeria, East Africa, Italian Somaliland, Abyssinia, British Somaliland, West Africa	East African Campaign	Regular Army	2nd (African)	The brigade was formed when the 1st (West Africa) Infantry Brigade was redesignated. For a short period during June 1940, the brigade was known as the 3rd (Nigeria) Infantry Brigade. It was redesignated as the 1st (West Africa) Infantry Brigade on 4 September 1941.	
24th (Gold Coast) Infantry Brigade	18 October 1940	1 December 1941	East Africa, Italian Somaliland, Abyssinia, South Africa	East African Campaign	Regular Army	12th (African)	The brigade was formed when the 2nd (West Africa) Infantry Brigade was redesignated. It was redesignated as the 2nd (West Africa) Infantry Brigade on 1 December 1941.	
24th Infantry Brigade (Guards)	13 February 1940	N/A	UK, Norway, Tunisia, Italy	Norwegian campaign, Tunisia, Italy	Regular Army	1st Infantry, 6th South African Armoured, 56th (London)	Became an independent brigade on 20 November 1940. Between that date and 29 October 1942 and then again between 13 March 1944 and 10 March 1945, the brigade was an independent brigade group with supporting arms. On 10 March 1945, it ceased its independent role and was permanently assigned to the 56th (London) Infantry Division.	
25th (East Africa) Infantry Brigade	18 October 1940	N/A	East Africa, Abyssinia, Ceylon, British India, Burma	East African campaign, Burma	Regular Army	1st South African, 11th (East Africa), 12th (African)	The brigade was formed when the 5th (East Africa) Infantry Brigade was redesignated. It ended the war based in India.	
25th Infantry Brigade	1 November 1939	31 August 1944	UK, France, Belgium	Battle of France	Regular Army	47th (London)	The brigade was disbanded in the UK on 31 August 1944.	
26th (East Africa) Infantry Brigade	4 January 1941	N/A	East Africa, British Somaliland, Abyssinia, Ceylon, British India, Burma	East African campaign, Burma	Regular Army	11th (East Africa), 12th (African)	The brigade was formed when the King's African Rifles were expanded and was recruited from the British East Africa colonies. It ended the war based in British India.	
26th Infantry Brigade	Existing	7 August 1940	UK	did not see combat	Second-Line Territorial Army	9th (Highland)	The duplicate of the 152nd Infantry Brigade. On 7 August 1940, after the 152nd Brigade had been captured during the Battle of France, the brigade was redesignated as the 152nd Infantry Brigade.	
26th Infantry Brigade	6 April 1945	N/A	Burma, British India	Burma	Regular Army	36th Infantry	The brigade was formed in Burma on 6 April 1945, when the Indian Army's 26th Indian Infantry Brigade was redesignated. The brigade ended the war in British India.	
27th (East Africa) Infantry Brigade	April 1945	N/A	East Africa	did not see combat	Regular Army	N/A	The brigade was formed when the 27th (N Rhodesia) Infantry Brigade was redesignated. It ended the war based in East Africa.	
27th Infantry Brigade	Existing	7 August 1940	UK	did not see combat	Second-Line Territorial Army	9th (Highland)	The duplicate of the 153rd Infantry Brigade. On 7 August 1940, after the 153rd Brigade had been captured during the Battle of France, the brigade was redesignated as the 153rd Infantry Brigade.	
27th (N Rhodesia) Infantry Brigade	3 October 1940	April 1945	East Africa, South Africa, Madagascar	Battle of Madagascar	Regular Army	N/A	The brigade was formed when the 7th (N Rhodesia) Infantry Brigade was redesignated. During April 1942, it was reorganised as a brigade group. In April 1945, it was redesignated as the 27th (East Africa) Infantry Brigade.	
28th (East Africa) Infantry Brigade	9 July 1941	1 June 1945	East Africa, Abyssinia, French Somaliland, Ceylon, British India, Burma	East African campaign, Burma	Regular Army	7th Indian, 11th (East Africa), 12th (African)	The brigade was formed when the King's African Rifles were expanded and was recruited from the British East Africa colonies. During April 1943, it became an independent infantry brigade. On 18 April 1945, the brigade ceased to command any units, and was disbanded in British India on 1 June 1945.	
28th Infantry Brigade	Existing	7 August 1940	UK	did not see combat	Second-Line Territorial Army	9th (Highland)	The duplicate of the 154th Infantry Brigade. On 7 August 1940, the brigade was absorbed by the 154th Brigade to make up losses.	
28th Infantry Brigade	1 December 1943	N/A	Egypt, Italy, Greece	Italy	Regular Army	4th Infantry	Formed when the 2nd Gibraltar Brigade was redesignated. The brigade ended the war based in Greece.	
29th (East Africa) Infantry Brigade	March 1942	N/A	East Africa, Abyssinia	did not see combat	Regular Army	12th (African)	The brigade was formed when the King's African Rifles were expanded and was recruited from the British East Africa colonies. On 1 October 1944, it was redesignated the 29th (East Africa) Training Brigade. It ended the war based in East Africa.	
29th Infantry Brigade	20 September 1939; 14 July 1940	3 October 1939; N/A	Egypt, UK, South Africa, Madagascar, East Africa, British India, Burma	Battle of Madagascar, Burma	Regular Army	36th Indian, 36th Infantry	Formed when the Cairo Brigade was redesignated. On 3 October 1939, the brigade was redesignated as the 22nd Infantry Brigade. On 14 July 1940, the 29th Independent Infantry Brigade Group was formed in the UK. It was redesignated the 29th Infantry Brigade on 15 June 1944, and ended the war based in British India.	
30th (East Africa) Infantry Brigade	24 August 1942	15 August 1945	East Africa	did not see combat	Regular Army	N/A	The brigade was formed when the King's African Rifles were expanded and was recruited from the British East Africa colonies. On 15 August 1945, the brigade was disbanded in East Africa.	
30th Infantry Brigade	24 April 1940	26 May 1940	UK, France	Siege of Calais	Regular Army	N/A	The brigade was captured on 26 May 1940, following the Siege of Calais	
30th Independent Infantry Brigade (Guards)	17 October 1940	15 September 1941	UK	did not see combat	Regular Army	N/A	The brigade was redesignated as the 6th Guards Armoured Brigade on 15&September 1941 and was converted into an armoured role.	
31st (East Africa) Infantry Brigade	15 January 1943	N/A	East Africa, Abyssinia	did not see combat	Regular Army	N/A	The brigade was formed on paper on 15 January 1943. Its commander and King's African Rifles battalions were not assigned until March 1943. It ended the war based in East Africa.	
31st Independent Brigade Group	17 July 1940	10 December 1941	UK	did not see combat	Regular Army	N/A	The brigade was redesignated as the 1st Airlanding Brigade on 10&December 1941 and became an airborne formation.	
32nd Infantry Brigade (Guards)	1 October 1941	N/A	UK, France, Belgium, Netherlands, Germany	Normandy, Advance from Paris to the Rhine, Invasion of Germany	Regular Army	Guards Armoured	The brigade ended the war in Germany.	
33rd Independent Infantry Brigade (Guards)	24 October 1941	6 October 1943	UK	did not see combat	Regular Army	N/A	The brigade was reorganised as an independent infantry brigade group on 10 November 1942. The brigade was disbanded on 6 October 1943.	
35th Infantry Brigade	7 October 1939	28 November 1940	UK, France	Battle of France	Second-Line Territorial Army	12th (Eastern)	The brigade was the duplicate of the 131st Infantry Brigade. The brigade was overrun during the fighting in France, and the survivors returned to the UK. On 28 November 1940, the brigade was redesignated as the 169th (London) Infantry Brigade.	
36th Infantry Brigade	7 October 1939	N/A	UK, France, Tunisia, Italy, Egypt, Austria	Battle of France	Second-Line Territorial Army	12th (Eastern), 78th Infantry	The brigade was the duplicate of the 132nd Infantry Brigade. Overrun during the fighting in France, the survivors returned to the UK. On 28 June 1940, the brigade was redesignated as the 36th Independent Infantry Brigade. On 22 June 1942, it reverted to the 36th Infantry Brigade. It ended the war in Austria.	
37th Infantry Brigade	7 October 1939	8 December 1941	UK, France	Battle of France	Second-Line Territorial Army	12th (Eastern), 3rd Infantry, 9th Armoured, 47th Infantry (Reserve)	The brigade was the duplicate of the 133rd Infantry Brigade. Overrun during the fighting in France, the survivors returned to the UK. On 9 July 1940, the brigade was redesignated as the 37th Independent Infantry Brigade. On 8 December 1941, it was redesignated as the 7th Infantry Brigade.	
38th (Irish) Infantry Brigade	13 January 1942	N/A	UK, Tunisia, Italy, Egypt, Austria	Tunisia, Italy	Regular Army	6th Armoured, 78th Infantry	The brigade was formed when the 210th Independent Infantry Brigade (Home) was redesignated. It ended the war in Austria.	
42nd Infantry Brigade	26 July 1943	29 July 1944	UK, Tunisia	did not see combat	Regular Army	N/A	The brigade was formed to provide security along the lines of communication for forces fighting in the Tunisian campaign. On 9 November 1943, as part of an Allied deception effort, the brigade was redesignated as the 57th Infantry Division. On 29 July 1944, the brigade (along with the fictional 57th Division) was disbanded in North Africa.	
43rd Infantry Brigade	16 August 1943	30 June 1944	UK, Tunisia, Italy	did not see combat	Regular Army	N/A	The brigade was formed to provide security along the lines of communication for forces fighting in Tunisia. On 9 November 1943, as part of an Allied deception effort, the brigade was redesignated as the 40th Infantry Division. On 17 June 1944, the brigade ceased operating as the 40th Division, and on 30 June the brigade was disbanded in Sicily.	
44th Infantry Brigade	Existing	N/A	UK, France, Belgium, Netherlands, Germany	Normandy, Advance from Paris to the Rhine, Invasion of Germany	Second-Line Territorial Army	15th (Scottish)	The brigade was the duplicate of the 155th Infantry Brigade. The brigade was also known as the 44th (Lowland) Infantry Brigade and ended the war in Germany.	
45th Infantry Brigade	Existing	26 September 1944	UK	did not see combat	Second-Line Territorial Army	15th (Scottish), 38th Infantry (Reserve), 80th Infantry (Reserve)	The brigade was the duplicate of the 156th Infantry Brigade. The brigade was also known as the 45th (Lowland) Infantry Brigade. The brigade was redesignated as the 113th Infantry Brigade on 26 September 1944.	
46th Infantry Brigade	Existing	N/A	UK, France, Belgium, Netherlands, Germany	Normandy, Advance from Paris to the Rhine, Invasion of Germany	Second-Line Territorial Army	15th (Scottish),	The brigade was the duplicate of the 157th Infantry Brigade. The brigade was also known as the 46th (Highland) Infantry Brigade. It ended the war in Germany.	
52nd Infantry Brigade	16 September 1943	1 August 1945	British India	Not a combat formation	Regular Army	N/A	The brigade was formed to train British reinforcements, who had arrived in British India, in jungle warfare. On 1 August 1945, the brigade was redesignated as Headquarters Training Group.	
53rd Infantry Brigade	18 September 1939	15 February 1942	UK, British Malaya	Malaya, Battle of Singapore	First-Line Territorial Army	18th Infantry	The brigade was formed when the 163rd Infantry Brigade was redesignated. The brigade was captured following the Battle of Singapore.	
54th Infantry Brigade	17 September 1939	15 February 1942	UK, British India, British Malaya	Battle of Singapore	Second-Line Territorial Army	18th Infantry	First-line unit not identified. The brigade was captured following the Battle of Singapore.	
55th Infantry Brigade	18 September 1939	15 February 1942	UK, British India, British Malaya	Battle of Singapore	Second-Line Territorial Army	18th Infantry	First-line unit not identified. The brigade was captured following the Battle of Singapore.	
56th Infantry Brigade	15 February 1944	N/A	UK, France, Belgium, Netherlands, Germany	Normandy, Advance from Paris to the Rhine, Invasion of Germany	Regular Army	49th (West Riding)	The brigade ended the war in Germany.	
61st Infantry Brigade	21 May 1944	N/A	Italy, Austria	Italy	Regular Army	6th Armoured	The brigade was formed as 'M' Brigade, and redesignated as the 61st Infantry Brigade on 29 May 1944. On 20 March 1945, it was redesignated as the 61st Lorried infantry Brigade. It ended the war in Austria.	
66th Infantry Brigade	20 July 1944	N/A	Italy, Palestine, Syria	Italy	Regular Army	1st Armoured	The brigade was formed in Italy from British forces based there. It ended the war in Syria.	
69th Infantry Brigade	Existing	December 1944	UK, France, Egypt, Cyprus, Iraq, Syria, Italian-Libya, Tunisia, Italy, Belgium, Netherlands	Battle of France, Western Desert, Tunisia, Allied invasion of Sicily, Normandy, Advance from Paris to the Rhine, Invasion of Germany	Second-Line Territorial Army	23rd (Northumbrian), 50th (Northumbrian)	The brigade was the duplicate of the 150th Infantry Brigade. In December 1944, the brigade returned to the UK and became a training formation, ending the war there.	
70th Infantry Brigade	Existing	19 October 1944	UK, France, Iceland	Battle of France, Normandy	Second-Line Territorial Army	23rd (Northumbrian), 49th (West Riding)	The brigade was the duplicate of the 151st Infantry Brigade. The brigade was overrun during the Battle of France. On 27 June 1940, after the survivors returned to the UK, the brigade was redesignated as the 70th Independent Infantry Brigade. It reverted to its prior title on 16 September 1940. The brigade was disbanded in France on 19 October 1944, after the end of the fighting in the Battle of Normandy.	
71st Infantry Brigade	28 November 1940	N/A	UK, France, Belgium, Netherlands, Germany	Normandy, Advance from Paris to the Rhine, Invasion of Germany	Regular Army	42nd Armoured, 53rd (Welsh)	The brigade was formed when the 3rd London Infantry Brigade was redesignated. On 12 December 1940, the formation was redesignated as the 71st Independent Infantry Brigade; it reverted to its prior title on 14 June 1942.	
72nd Independent Infantry Brigade	7 January 1941; 28 April 1944	1 June 1943; N/A	UK, British India, Burma	Burma	Regular Army	36th Indian, 36th Infantry	On 1 June 1943, the brigade was redesignated as the 5th Parachute Brigade. The 72nd Infantry Brigade was formed, in British India, when the 72nd Indian Infantry Brigade was redesignated. The brigade ended the war in British India.	
73rd Infantry Brigade	24 March 1941	19 July 1943	UK	did not see combat	Regular Army	N/A	The brigade was formed to oversee training within Western Command's area of responsibility. On 19 May 1941, the brigade was redesignated as Force 109, and reverted to its prior title on 18 June 1941. On 13 December 1942, the brigade ceased to be operational, and was disbanded on 19 July 1943.	

== See also ==
- British Army during the Second World War
- British deception formations in World War II
- British infantry brigades of the First World War
- List of British infantry brigades of the Second World War (101–308 and named)

== Notes ==
Footnotes

Citations
