= List of British infantry brigades of the Second World War (101–308 and named) =

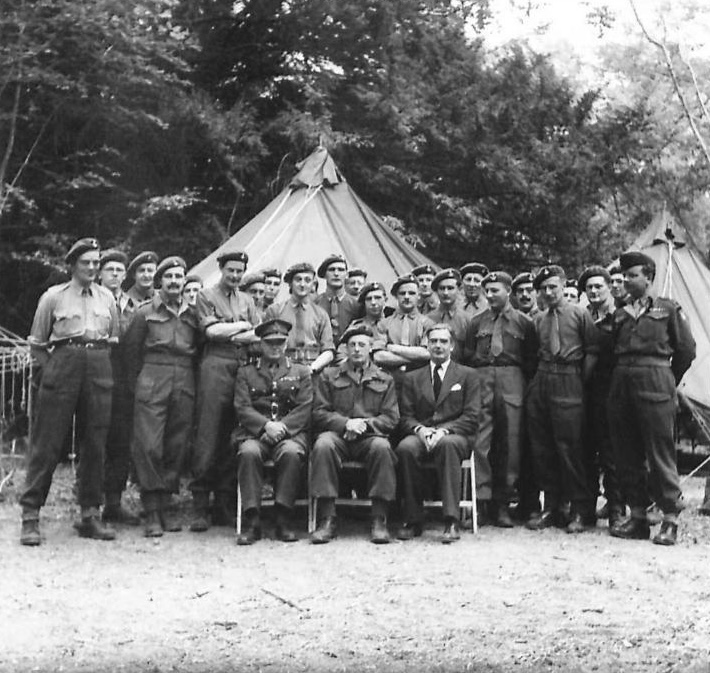
During the Second World War, British brigades were commanded by a brigadier. Here Brigadier Ronald Senior (centre) with the staff of the 151st Infantry Brigade, who have been visited by Lieutenant-General William Duthie Morgan (left) and the Foreign Secretary Anthony Eden (right) in 1944.

During the Second World War, a British infantry brigade consisted of multiple battalions and was commanded by a brigadier. Generally, three infantry brigades would form an infantry division, although brigades could be used as independent formations in which case, they were usually assigned to a corps-level command to be utilised. Brigades were flexible formations and rarely maintained the same battalions. Likewise, brigades could be moved from division to division or higher-level commands, as the tactical or strategic need arose. Their role could also vary dramatically, from being a combat formation to becoming a training organisation. Over the course of the war, the British Army had 216 uniquely numbered or named brigade formations. However, not all existed at the same time, and several were formed by renaming or renumbering existing formations. This article focuses on all brigades numbered above 100 and those that were named. Those numbered 100 and below are located within their own list.

During the Second World War, the British Army was split between two branches: the regular army, made up of full time professionals; and the Territorial Army (TA), which consisted of part-time reservists. The TA was seen as the primary way to expand the size of the British military during a war. To do so, the existing TA formations, which were referred to as the first-line, would create a new formation based around a cadre of soldiers. The new formation, referred to as the second-line, would then be expanded until it reached full strength. The regular army also created new brigades when existing infantry battalions were grouped together. The retraining of members of the Royal Artillery also saw the creation of many additional infantry brigades.

== Background ==
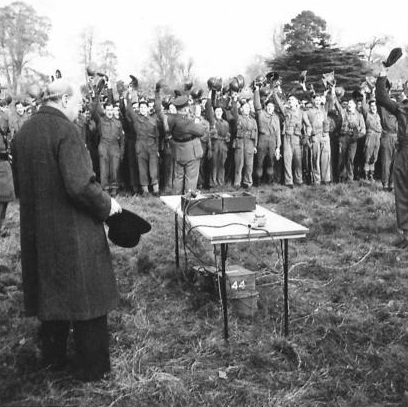
The infantry, the backbone of the British Army. A brigade of the 53rd (Welsh) Infantry Division cheer Prime Minister Winston Churchill.

During the Second World War, the infantry was the backbone of the British Army. Within the British Army, the infantry was organised into regiments, however, these were administrative structures and not operational units. The fighting unit of an infantry regiment was the battalion, and a regiment could field numerous battalions. A brigade generally consisted of three infantry battalions commanded by a brigadier, and were around 2,500-men strong. In combat, brigades were provided support from artillery, engineers, and other supporting arms as needed. Generally, these assets belonged to the higher formations that the brigade belonged to.

Brigades were not set formations, and their composition and role could change because of tactical or strategic demands. For example, the 114th Infantry Brigade contained the same three battalions throughout the course of the war. In contrast, the 144th Infantry Brigade had 15 different battalions under its command during the war. It was unusual for a brigade to consist solely of battalions from one regiment. From the list below, excluding the Royal Marines and those formed by the conversion of anti-aircraft formations, only nine brigades had more than one battalion from the same regiment at the same time. Of those, the 128th (Hampshire Regiment), the 131st (Queen's Royal Regiment (West Surrey)), and the 177th Infantry Brigades (South Staffordshire Regiment) maintained battalions from the same regiment for the duration of their existence during the war. A brigade could be an independent formation, answerable only to a high-level command, or one assigned to a division. Those assigned to divisions could be switched between formations depending on the strategic need. For example, the 114th and the 129th Infantry Brigades never left their respective divisions throughout the entire course of the war, whereas the 157th Infantry Brigade was assigned to four different divisions, six corps-level commands, and one army group command.

The British Army was split into two branches: the regular army, which numbered 224,000 men with a reserve of 173,700 at the start of the war, and the part-time Territorial Army (TA), which numbered 438,100 with a reserve of around 20,750 men. The main goal of the regular army, built largely around battalion-size units, was to maintain the peace and defend the British Empire. David Fraser, a historian and a former general, argued that during the inter-war period, the British Army did not field a force of infantry brigades and divisions; those that officially existed, did so only on paper. While battalions were organised into brigades, they were dispersed and were deficient in artillery, communication, engineer, logistical, and transportation assets. In the event of war, brigades ready and equipped to fight as part of a division would need to be assembled from the available battalions, while other forces required for brigades and divisions would have to be raised. At the outset of war, the regular army had 24 infantry brigades. The majority were stationed within the UK, although there were six based in the Middle East, one garrisoned Malta, and one each was based in West Africa, British Malaya, and Hong Kong.

In 1940, the size of the British Army increased dramatically as 140 new infantry battalions were raised. The majority of these were assigned to the 201st through 227th Independent Infantry Brigades (Home), which were intended for a static defence role along vulnerable coastal sectors and were assigned to county divisions. These brigades were also unique in that they could have up to five battalions assigned to them at any one time. By mid-1944, the British Army faced a manpower crisis as it did not have enough men to replace the losses suffered by front line infantry units. Efforts were made to address this, such as transferring men from the Royal Artillery and retraining them as infantry. These men were formed into 301st, and the 303rd to 308th Infantry Brigades. Likewise, two brigades were formed by the Royal Marines in an effort to alleviate the crisis. The 116th and the 117th Infantry Brigades Royal Marines were largely drawn from landing craft crew who had previously been trained as infantry as part of the Royal Marines Division. Over the course of the war, 140 regular army brigades would be raised, although they would not all exist at the same time, and many were re-designated from one number or name to another.

The TA was intended to be the primary method of expanding the number of formations available to the British Army. However, during the inter-war period, the British government reduced the funding and size of the TA. By 1936, they had concluded the TA could not be modernised or equipped for a European war over the following three-year period, and therefore delayed further funding. Following the German occupation of the remnants of the Czechoslovak state in March 1939, the TA was ordered to be doubled in size. At the beginning of 1939, the TA had 35 infantry brigades. The existing formations, termed the first-line, were ordered to create a second formation using a cadres of trained personnel. The new formations were termed the second-line, and the process was termed "duplicating". (Note: All TA recruits were required to take the general service obligation: if the British Government decided, territorial soldiers could be deployed overseas for combat. (This avoided the complications of the First World War-era Territorial Force, whose members were not required to leave Britain unless they volunteered for overseas service.) The plan was for the first-line formations to recruit over their establishments (aided by improvements in conditions of service) and then form a new brigade from cadres around which the new formation could be expanded.) By the outbreak of the war, some of these second-line brigades had been formed while others were still being created. By the end of 1939, the TA had increased to 32 first-line and 32 second-line infantry brigades.

During the 1939–1940 period, each brigade of the British Expeditionary Force was assigned a company of nine French 25 mm Hotchkiss anti-tank guns. After the Battle of France and the evacuation from Dunkirk, additional brigade anti-tank companies were formed and equipped with the Ordnance QF 2-pounder (40 mm) anti-tank gun. Over the course of the following year, these companies were disbanded. The British Army implemented lessons learnt from the battle of France. This included brigades, in the UK, being reorganised into brigade groups, which involved attaching artillery, anti-aircraft guns, anti-tank guns, machine guns, and engineers to them. This change was then implemented in brigades overseas. Brigades organised in this fashion within a division, compromised the division's ability to centralise and concentrate artillery fire to support the infantry brigades. After training exercises in the UK showed the weakness of these formations, those based within the UK were reorganised as regular brigades and the additional units reassigned back to being divisional assets. Those organised as brigade groups and that fought in the Western Desert Campaign, were maintained as such through most of 1942. These groups, due to a lack of firepower and not being concentrated with other formations, were engaged in several one-sided affairs against Axis divisional size forces and defeated.

The British infantry were highly motorized, with each battalion having enough transport capable of moving each platoon's weapons, equipment, and supplies. At the beginning of the war and within a divisional organisation, there was enough available motor transport to move an entire infantry brigade at once. When additional motor transport was not available, the infantry marched. As the war progressed, additional transportation was made available to the infantry. An infantry battalion, which had been provided with sufficient lorries to allow the movement of all personnel and equipment at once, was referred to as a lorried infantry battalion. A variant was the motor battalion, drawn from the army's rifle regiments. They were fully motorised but varied in organisation compared to the other infantry battalions. As the war progressed, these units were also outfitted with lend-lease half-tracks. When lorried or motor battalions were grouped together, their brigade sometimes took on an identifier such as the 133rd Lorried Infantry Brigade.

== Infantry brigades ==
List of infantry brigades numbered 101 to 308
Formation name	Existing or date created	Date ceased to exist	Location(s) served	Notable campaign(s)	Branch	Division(s) mostly associated with	Notes	Source(s)
103rd Infantry Brigade	25 April 1945	N/A	Belgium, Netherlands, Germany	did not see combat	Regular Army	N/A	H.F. Joslen, the compiler of the official history of the British Army's orders of battle, stated no 103rd Infantry Brigade was formed. The War Diary of the 39th Anti-Aircraft Brigade stated that the anti-aircraft formation was redesignated as an infantry formation in April 1945, and ended the war in Germany.	
113th Infantry Brigade	Existing; 26 September 1944	5 September 1944; N/A	UK	did not see combat	Second-Line Territorial Army	38th (Welsh)	The brigade was the duplicate of the 160th Infantry Brigade. On 5 September 1944, the brigade was disbanded. A new brigade was formed when the 45th Infantry Brigade was redesignated on 26 September 1944, and ended the war in the UK.	
114th Infantry Brigade	Existing; 1 September 1944	20 July 1944; N/A	UK	did not see combat	Second-Line Territorial Army	38th (Welsh)	The brigade was the duplicate of the 159th Infantry Brigade. On 20 July 1944, the brigade was disbanded. A new 114th Brigade was formed when 211th Infantry Brigade was redesignated. It ended the war in the UK.	
115th Infantry Brigade	Existing	N/A	UK, France, Belgium, Netherlands, Germany	Western Allied invasion of Germany	Second-Line Territorial Army	38th (Welsh)	The brigade was the duplicate of the 158th Infantry Brigade. On 10 March 1944, the brigade was assigned to provide logistical support to forces preparing for Operation Overlord. On 2 August 1944, the brigade was redesignated as Force 135 for a potential reoccupation of the Channel Islands. On 30 January 1945, the force reverted to its prior title. The brigade ended the war in Germany.	
116th Infantry Brigade Royal Marines	4 January 1945	N/A	UK, Netherlands, Germany	Western Allied invasion of Germany	Royal Marines	N/A	The brigade was formed from troops who had previously served in the Royal Marines Division, and had subsequently been retrained as landing craft crew. The brigade ended the war in the UK.	
117th Infantry Brigade Royal Marines	15 January 1945	N/A	UK, Belgium, Germany	Western Allied invasion of Germany	Royal Marines	N/A	The brigade was formed from troops who had previously served in the Royal Marines Division, and had subsequently been retrained as landing craft crew. The brigade ended the war in the UK.	
125th Infantry Brigade	Existing	1 November 1941	UK, France, Belgium	Battle of France	First-Line Territorial Army	42nd (East Lancashire)	The brigade was redesignated as the 10th Armoured Brigade on 1 November 1941.	
126th Infantry Brigade	Existing	1 November 1941	UK, France, Belgium	Battle of France	First-Line Territorial Army	42nd (East Lancashire)	The brigade was redesignated as the 11th Armoured Brigade on 1 November 1941.	
127th Infantry Brigade	Existing	1 November 1941	UK, France, Belgium	Battle of France	First-Line Territorial Army	42nd (East Lancashire)	The brigade was redesignated as the 42nd Support Group on 1 November 1941.	
128th Infantry Brigade	Existing	N/A	UK, Tunisia, Italy, Egypt, Palestine, Syria, Greece, Austria	Tunisia, Italy	First-Line Territorial Army	43rd (Wessex), 46th Infantry	The brigade ended the war in Austria.	
129th Infantry Brigade	Existing	N/A	UK, France, Belgium, Netherlands, Germany	Normandy, Allied advance from Paris to the Rhine, Western Allied invasion of Germany	First-Line Territorial Army	43rd (Wessex)	The brigade ended the war in Germany.	
130th Infantry Brigade	Existing	N/A	UK, France, Belgium, Netherlands, Germany	Normandy, Allied advance from Paris to the Rhine, Western Allied invasion of Germany	First-Line Territorial Army	43rd (Wessex)	The brigade ended the war in Germany.	
131st Infantry Brigade	Existing	N/A	UK, France, Belgium, Egypt, Italian-Libya, Tunisia, Italy, Belgium, Netherlands, Germany	Battle of France, Western Desert, Italy, Normandy, Allied advance from Paris to the Rhine, Western Allied invasion of Germany	First-Line Territorial Army	7th Armoured, 44th (Home Counties)	The brigade was also known as the 131st (Queen's) Infantry Brigade, due to it being composed solely of battalions from the Queen's Royal Regiment (West Surrey) regiment. During October 1942, the brigade became the 131st Lorried Infantry Brigade, and reverted in March 1944. The brigade ended the war in Germany.	
132nd Infantry Brigade	Existing	15 January 1943	UK, France, Belgium, Egypt	Battle of France, Western Desert	First-Line Territorial Army	44th (Home Counties)	The brigade was disbanded in Egypt on 15 January 1943	
133rd Infantry Brigade	Existing	16 January 1943	UK, France, Belgium, Egypt	Battle of France, Western Desert	First-Line Territorial Army	10th Armoured, 44th (Home Counties), 51st (Highland)	The brigade became a lorried infantry brigade during October 1942, and was disbanded in Egypt on 16 January 1943.	
134th Infantry Brigade	Existing; 1 September 1944	15 August 1944; N/A	UK	did not see combat	Second-Line Territorial Army	45th Infantry	First-line unit not identified. The brigade was disbanded on 15 August 1944, and a new brigade was formed when the 203rd Infantry Brigade was redesignated on 1 September 1944. The brigade ended the war in the UK.	
135th Infantry Brigade	Existing; 1 September 1944	20 July 1944; N/A	UK	did not see combat	Second-Line Territorial Army	45th Infantry	First-line unit not identified. The brigade was disbanded on 20 July 1944, and a new brigade was formed when the 209th Infantry Brigade was redesignated on 1 September. The brigade ended the war in the UK.	
136th Infantry Brigade	Existing; 1 February 1945	31 August 1944; N/A	UK	did not see combat	Second-Line Territorial Army	45th Infantry	First-line unit not identified. The brigade was disbanded on 31 August 1944. On 1 February 1945, a new brigade was formed to administer reception camps for personnel returning to the UK, and to train them. The brigade ended the war in the UK.	
137th Infantry Brigade	Existing; 28 March 1945	20 July 1942; N/A	UK	did not see combat	Second-Line Territorial Army	45th Infantry, 46th Infantry	The brigade was formed as the duplicate of the 147th Infantry Brigade. On 20 July 1942, the brigade was converted and redesignated as the 137th Armoured Brigade. A new brigade was formed, on 28 March 1945, to administer reception camps for personnel returning to the UK, and to train them. The brigade ended the war in the UK.	
138th Infantry Brigade	Existing	N/A	UK, France, Tunisia, Italy, Egypt, Palestine, Syria, Greece, Austria	Battle of France, Tunisia, Italy	Second-Line Territorial Army	46th Infantry	The brigade was formed as the duplicate of the 146th Infantry Brigade. The brigade ended the war in Austria.	
139th Infantry Brigade	Existing	N/A	UK, France, Tunisia, Italy, Egypt, Palestine, Syria, Greece, Austria	Battle of France, Tunisia, Italy	Second-Line Territorial Army	46th Infantry	The brigade was formed as the duplicate of the 148th Infantry Brigade. The brigade ended the war in Austria.	
140th Infantry Brigade	1 September 1944	N/A	UK	did not see combat	Regular Army	47th Infantry (Reserve)	The brigade was formed when the 213th Infantry Brigade was redesignated. It ended the war in the UK.	
140th (London) Infantry Brigade	21 November 1940	31 August 1944	UK	did not see combat	Second-Line Territorial Army	47th (London)	The brigade was formed when the 4th London Infantry Brigade was redesignated. The brigade was disbanded on 31 August 1944.	
141st Infantry Brigade	17 November 1944	N/A	UK	did not see combat	Regular Army	47th Infantry (Reserve)	The brigade was formed when the 220th Infantry Brigade was redesignated. The brigade ended the war in the UK.	
141st (London) Infantry Brigade	Existing	27 October 1940	UK	did not see combat	Second-Line Territorial Army	47th (London)	The brigade was formed when the 5th London Infantry Brigade was redesignated. The brigade was disbanded on 27 October 1944.	
143rd Infantry Brigade	Existing	5 August 1944	UK, France, Belgium	Battle of France	First-Line Territorial Army	48th (South Midland)	On 5 August 1944, the brigade became a training formation and ended the war in the UK.	
144th Infantry Brigade	Existing	5 August 1944	UK, France, Belgium	Battle of France	First-Line Territorial Army	48th (South Midland)	On 5 August 1944, the brigade became a training formation and ended the war in the UK.	
145th Infantry Brigade	Existing	7 November 1943	UK, France, Belgium	Battle of France	First-Line Territorial Army	48th (South Midland)	The majority of the brigade's personnel were rendered casualties or captured during the Battle of France. The remnants returned to the UK on 1 June 1940, and the brigade re-formed. On 7 November 1943, the brigade was disbanded in the UK.	
146th Infantry Brigade	Existing	N/A	UK, Norway, Iceland, France, Belgium, Netherlands, Germany	Norwegian, Normandy, Allied advance from Paris to the Rhine, Western Allied invasion of Germany	First-Line Territorial Army	49th (West Riding)	The brigade ended the war in Germany.	
147th Infantry Brigade	Existing	N/A	UK, Iceland, France, Belgium, Netherlands, Germany	Normandy, Allied advance from Paris to the Rhine, Western Allied invasion of Germany	First-Line Territorial Army	49th (West Riding)	The brigade ended the war in Germany.	
148th Infantry Brigade	Existing	25 July 1942	UK, Norway	Norwegian	First-Line Territorial Army	49th (West Riding)	On 14 November 1940, the brigade was reorganized as an independent brigade group. On 25 July 1942, the brigade became an officer candidate training formation.	
150th Infantry Brigade	Existing	1 June 1942	UK, France, Belgium, Egypt, Cyprus, Palestine, Italian-Libya	Battle of France, Western Desert	First-Line Territorial Army	50th (Northumbrian)	The brigade was captured on 1 June 1942, during the Battle of Gazala.	
151st Infantry Brigade	Existing	N/A	UK, France, Belgium, Egypt, Cyprus, Palestine, Iraq, Italian-Libya, Tunisia, Italy, Netherlands	Battle of France, Western Desert, Tunisia, Allied invasion of Sicily, Normandy, Allied advance from Paris to the Rhine, Western Allied invasion of Germany	First-Line Territorial Army	50th (Northumbrian)	The brigade returned to the UK on 14 December 1944, and became a training brigade remaining in the UK for the rest of the war.	
152nd Infantry Brigade	Existing; 7 August 1940	12 June 1940; N/A	UK, France, Belgium, Egypt, Italian-Libya, Tunisia, Italy, Netherlands, Germany	Battle of France, Western Desert, Tunisia, Allied invasion of Sicily, Italy, Normandy, Allied advance from Paris to the Rhine, Western Allied invasion of Germany	First-Line Territorial Army	51st (Highland)	The brigade was captured during the Battle of France. A new 152nd Infantry Brigade was formed when their second-line brigade, the 26th Infantry Brigade, was redesignated. The brigade ended the war in Germany.	
153rd Infantry Brigade	Existing; 7 August 1940	12 June 1940; N/A	UK, France, Belgium, Egypt, Italian-Libya, Tunisia, Italy, Netherlands, Germany	Battle of France, Western Desert, Tunisia, Allied invasion of Sicily, Normandy, Allied advance from Paris to the Rhine, Western Allied invasion of Germany	First-Line Territorial Army	51st (Highland)	The brigade was captured during the Battle of France. A new 153rd Infantry Brigade was formed when their second-line brigade, the 27th nfantry Brigade, was redesignated.	
154th Infantry Brigade	Existing	N/A	UK, France, Egypt, Italian-Libya, Tunisia, Italy, Belgium Netherlands, Germany	Battle of France, Western Desert, Tunisia, Allied invasion of Sicily, Italy, Normandy, Allied advance from Paris to the Rhine, Western Allied invasion of Germany	First-Line Territorial Army	51st (Highland)	The brigade suffered heavy losses during the Battle of France. These losses were made up by the brigade absorbing their second-line brigade, the 28th Infantry Brigade. The brigade ended the war in Germany.	
155th Infantry Brigade	Existing	N/A	UK, France, Belgium, Netherlands, Germany	Western Allied invasion of Germany	First-Line Territorial Army	52nd (Lowland)	The brigade ended the war in Germany.	
156th Infantry Brigade	Existing	N/A	UK, France, Belgium, Netherlands, Germany	Western Allied invasion of Germany	First-Line Territorial Army	52nd (Lowland)	The brigade ended the war in Germany.	
157th Infantry Brigade	Existing	N/A	UK, France, Belgium, Netherlands, Germany	Western Allied invasion of Germany	First-Line Territorial Army	52nd (Lowland)	The brigade ended the war in Germany.	
158th Infantry Brigade	Existing	N/A	UK, France, Belgium, Netherlands, Germany	Normandy, Allied advance from Paris to the Rhine, Western Allied invasion of Germany	First-Line Territorial Army	53rd (Welsh)	The brigade ended the war in Germany.	
159th Infantry Brigade	Existing	N/A	UK, France, Belgium, Netherlands, Germany	Normandy, Allied advance from Paris to the Rhine, Western Allied invasion of Germany	First-Line Territorial Army	11th Armoured, 53rd (Welsh)	The brigade ended the war in Germany.	
160th Infantry Brigade	Existing	N/A	UK, France, Belgium, Netherlands, Germany	Normandy, Allied advance from Paris to the Rhine, Western Allied invasion of Germany	First-Line Territorial Army	53rd (Welsh)	The brigade ended the war in Germany.	
161st Infantry Brigade	Existing	26 November 1941	UK, West Africa, Egypt, Cyprus	did not see combat	First-Line Territorial Army	54th (East Anglian)	On 26 November 1941, the brigade was redesignated as the 161st Indian Infantry Brigade and became part of the British Indian Army.	
162nd Infantry Brigade	Existing	26 November 1941	UK	did not see combat	First-Line Territorial Army	54th (East Anglian)	On 10 November 1942, the brigade was redesignated as the 162nd Independent Infantry Brigade, and then reverted to its prior title on 5 September 1943. On 31 August 1944, the brigade was disbanded.	
163rd Infantry Brigade	Existing; 18 September 1939	22 December 1943	UK	did not see combat	First-Line Territorial Army	54th (East Anglian)	On 18 September 1939, the brigade was redesignated as the 53rd Infantry Brigade. The same date, a new 163rd Infantry Brigade was created when the 161st Infantry Brigade's forming second-line formation, the 161st (duplicate) Infantry Brigade, was redesignated. On 22 December 1943, the brigade was disbanded and the staff assigned to control elements of the 21st Army Group's lines of communication.	
164th Infantry Brigade	Existing	2 July 1945	UK	did not see combat	First-Line Territorial Army	55th (West Lancashire)	On 2 July 1945, the brigade was disbanded.	
165th Infantry Brigade	Existing	N/A	UK	did not see combat	First-Line Territorial Army	55th (West Lancashire)	The brigade ended the war in the UK.	
166th Infantry Brigade	Existing; 15 August 1944	4 September 1939; N/A	UK	did not see combat	First-Line Territorial Army	55th (West Lancashire)	On 4 September 1939, the brigade was redesignated as the 176th Infantry Brigade. On 15 August 1944, a new brigade was formed when the 199th Infantry Brigade was redesignated. The brigade ended the war in the UK.	
167th (London) Infantry Brigade	28 November 1940	N/A	UK, Iraq, Palestine, Egypt, Italian-Libya, Tunisia, Italy	Tunisia, Italy	First-Line Territorial Army	56th (London)	On 28 November, the brigade was formed when the 1st London Infantry Brigade was redesignated. The brigade ended the war in the Italy.	
168th (London) Infantry Brigade	28 November 1940	1 January 1945	UK, Iraq, Palestine, Egypt, Italy	Tunisia, Allied invasion of Sicily, Italy	First-Line Territorial Army	56th (London)	The brigade was formed on 28 November 1940, when the 2nd London Infantry Brigade was redesignated. On 24 September 1944, the brigade ceased to be operational and was disbanded on 1 January 1945 in Italy.	
169th (London) Infantry Brigade	28 November 1940	N/A	UK, Iraq, Palestine, Egypt, Italian-Libya, Tunisia, Italy	Tunisia, Italy	Second-Line Territorial Army	56th (London)	The brigade was formed when the 35th Infantry Brigade was redesignated. The brigade ended the war in Italy.	
176th Infantry Brigade	4 September 1939	19 October 1944	UK, France	Normandy	First-Line Territorial Army	59th (Staffordshire)	The brigade was formed when the 166th Infantry Brigade was redesignated. On 26 August 1944, the brigade was broken up in France to provide reinforcements for other formations. The brigade was placed in 'suspended animation' on 19 October 1944.	
177th Infantry Brigade	4 September 1939	19 October 1944	UK, France	Normandy	Second-Line Territorial Army	59th (Staffordshire)	The brigade was the duplicate of the 166th Infantry Brigade. On 26 August 1944, the brigade was broken-up, in France, to provide reinforcements for other formations. On 19 October 1944, the brigade was disbanded.	
178th Infantry Brigade	21 April 1945	11 August 1945	UK	Not a combat formation	Regular Army	45th Infantry	The brigade was formed to receive and provide training to personnel who had returned to the UK after being wounded overseas, or being deemed unfit for frontline service. The brigade was disbanded on 11 August 1945.	
182nd Infantry Brigade	Existing	N/A	UK	did not see combat	Second-line Territorial Army	61st Infantry	The brigade was the duplicate of the 143rd Infantry Brigade. The brigade ended the war in the UK.	
183rd Infantry Brigade	Existing; 20 July 1944	21 July 1944; N/A	UK	did not see combat	Second-line Territorial Army	61st Infantry	The brigade was the duplicate of the 144th Infantry Brigade. On 9 April 1944, the brigade ceased to be an infantry formation and began to administer logistical efforts connected with Operation Overlord. On 20/21 July 1944, the brigade was redesignated the 184th Infantry Brigade, and the 184th Brigade was redesignated as the 183rd Infantry Brigade. The brigade ended the war in the UK.	
184th Infantry Brigade	Existing; 20 July 1944	21 July 1944; N/A	UK	did not see combat	Second-line Territorial Army	61st Infantry	The brigade was the duplicate of the 145th Infantry Brigade. On 20/21 July 1944, the brigade was redesignated the 183rd Infantry Brigade; it was redesignated as the 184th Infantry Brigade. The brigade ended the war in the UK.	
185th Infantry Brigade	1 September 1942	N/A	UK, France, Belgium, Netherlands, Germany	Normandy, Allied advance from Paris to the Rhine, Western Allied invasion of Germany	Regular Army	3rd Infantry, 79th Armoured	The brigade was formed when the 20th Independent Infantry Brigade was redesignated. The brigade ended the war in Germany.	
197th Infantry Brigade	Existing	26 August 1944	UK, France	Normandy	Second-line Territorial Army	59th (Staffordshire), 66th Infantry	The brigade was the duplicate of the 125th Infantry Brigade. On 26 August 1944, the brigade was broken-up to provide reinforcements to other formations. The infantry brigade ceased to exist, although the headquarters was redesignated as Headquarters 197th Infantry Brigade (Battlefield Clearance)—an engineer and pioneer unit assigned to clearing equipment from battlefields.	
198th Infantry Brigade	Existing	14 December 1943	UK	did not see combat	Second-line Territorial Army	54th (East Anglian), 66th Infantry	The brigade was the duplicate of the 126th Infantry Brigade. On 23 June 1940, the brigade was redesignated the 198th Independent Infantry Brigade, and then reverted to its prior title on 20 December 1940. On 14 December 1943, the brigade was disbanded and the staff assigned to control elements of the 21st Army Group's lines of communication.	
199th Infantry Brigade	Existing	15 August 1944	UK	did not see combat	Second-line Territorial Army	55th (West Lancashire), 66th Infantry	The brigade was the duplicate of the 127th Infantry Brigade. On 15 August 1944, the brigade was redesignated as the 166th Infantry Brigade.	
200th Guards Brigade	14 January 1942	25 May 1942	Egypt, Italian-Libya	Western Desert	Regular Army	1st Armoured	The brigade was formed when the 22nd Guards Brigade was redesignated. On 6 April 1942, the brigade was reorganised as a brigade group and titled the 200th Guards Motor Brigade Group. On 25 May 1942, it was redesignated as the 201st Guards Motor Brigade Group.	
201st Guards Motor Brigade	25 May 1942; 14 August 1942	20 June 1942; N/A	Egypt, Italian-Libya, Tunisia, Italy, UK	Western Desert, Tunisia, Italy	Regular Army	56th (London)	The brigade was formed when the 200th Guards Motor Brigade Group was redesignated. On 20 June 1942, the brigade was captured during the Axis capture of Tobruk. It was reformed in Egypt as the 201st Guards Motor Brigade. Despite the name, it was reformed as a brigade group and was maintained as such until March 1944. In April 1944, the brigade arrived in the UK, where it remained for the rest of the war becoming a training unit.	
201st Independent Infantry Brigade (Home)	4 October 1940	13 December 1941	UK	did not see combat	Regular Army	West Sussex County, Yorkshire County	The brigade was formed when the No. 1 Training Group was redesignated. On 13 December 1941, the brigade was disbanded.	
202nd Independent Infantry Brigade (Home)	20 October 1940	22 December 1941	UK	did not see combat	Regular Army	Northumberland County	The brigade was formed when the No. 2 Training Group was redesignated. On 1 December 1941, the brigade ceased to be an operational formation, and was disbanded on 22 December.	
203rd Independent Infantry Brigade (Home)	11 October 1940	1 September 1944	UK	did not see combat	Regular Army	Devon and Cornwall County, 45th Infantry, 77th Infantry	The brigade was formed when the No. 3 Training Group was redesignated. On 1 December 1941, the brigade was redesignated as the 203rd Infantry Brigade. On 1 September 1944, it was redesignated as the 134th Infantry Brigade.	
204th Independent Infantry Brigade (Home)	12 October 1940	1 September 1942	UK	did not see combat	Regular Army	Lincolnshire County	The brigade was formed when the No. 4 Training Group was redesignated. On 25 November 1941, the brigade was redesignated as the 204th Independent Infantry Brigade. On 1 September 1942, the brigade was redesignated as the 185th Infantry Brigade.	
205th Independent Infantry Brigade (Home)	10 October 1940	1 December 1941	UK	did not see combat	Regular Army	Lincolnshire County	The brigade was formed by the re-designation of the No. 5 Training Group. On 1 December 1941, the brigade was redesignated as the 36th Tank Brigade.	
206th Independent Infantry Brigade (Home)	12 October 1940	1 December 1941	UK	did not see combat	Regular Army	43rd (Wessex), 44th Infantry, 46th Infantry, 56th (London)	The brigade was formed when the No. 6 Training Group was redesignated. During December 1941, the brigade was redesignated as the 206th Independent Infantry Brigade. On 6 October 1943, the brigade was disbanded.	
207th Independent Infantry Brigade (Home)	10 October 1940	24 January 1944	UK	did not see combat	Regular Army	Essex County, 18th Infantry	The brigade was formed when the No. 7 Training Group was redesignated. On 7 October 1941, the brigade was redesignated as the 207th Independent Infantry Brigade. On 24 January 1944, the brigade ceased to exist and the headquarters was redesignated as the Headquarters 8 Base sub-Area.	
208th Independent Infantry Brigade (Home)	6 October 1940	17 October 1941	UK	did not see combat	Regular Army	Essex County, 42nd (East Lancashire)	The brigade was formed when the No. 8 Training Group was redesignated. On 17 October 1941, the brigade was disbanded.	
209th Independent Infantry Brigade (Home)	13 October 1940	1 September 1944	UK	did not see combat	Regular Army	Devon and Cornwall County, 45th Infantry, 77th Infantry	The brigade was formed when the No. 9 Training Group was redesignated. On 1 December 1941, the brigade was redesignated as the 209th Infantry Brigade. On 1 September 1944, the brigade was redesignated as the 135th Infantry Brigade.	
210th Independent Infantry Brigade (Home)	10 October 1940	13 January 1942	UK	did not see combat	Regular Army	Dorset County, 1st Infantry, 6th Armoured, 46th Infantry, 78th Infantry	The brigade was formed when the No. 10 Training Group was redesignated. On 1 December 1941, the formation was redesignated as the 210th Independent Infantry Brigade, and on 13 January 1942 became the 38th (Irish) Infantry Brigade.	
211th Independent Infantry Brigade (Home)	11 October 1940	1 September 1944	UK	did not see combat	Regular Army	Devon and Cornwall County, 38th Infantry (Reserve), 77th Infantry, 80th Infantry (Reserve)	The brigade was formed when the No. 11 Training Group was redesignated. On 1 December 1941, the brigade was redesignated as the 211th Infantry Brigade. On 1 September 1944, the brigade was redesignated as the 114th Infantry Brigade.	
212th Independent Infantry Brigade (Home)	7 October 1940	14 November 1942	UK	did not see combat	Regular Army	Lincolnshire County, 54th (East Anglian)	The brigade was formed when the No. 12 Training Group was redesignated. On 21 November 1941, the brigade was redesignated as the 212th Independent Infantry Brigade. During July 1942, the brigade's component units were transferred away, and the brigade was disbanded on 14 November 1942.	
213th Independent Infantry Brigade (Home)	30 September 1940	1 September 1944	UK	did not see combat	Regular Army	Norfolk County, 47th Infantry (Reserve), 76th Infantry	The brigade was formed when the No. 13 Infantry Training Group was redesignated. On 18 November 1941, it was redesignated as the 213th Infantry Brigade. On 1 September 1944, it was redesignated as the 140th Infantry Brigade.	
214th Independent Infantry Brigade (Home)	11 October 1940	N/A	UK, France, Belgium, Netherlands, Germany	Normandy, Allied advance from Paris to the Rhine, Western Allied invasion of Germany	Regular Army	Hampshire County, 43rd (Wessex), 47th (London)	The brigade was formed when the No. 14 Infantry Training Group was redesignated. On 1 December 1941, it was redesignated as the 214th Independent Infantry Brigade. On 7 June 1945, it was redesignated as the 214th Infantry Brigade. It ended the war in Germany.	
215th Independent Infantry Brigade (Home)	10 October 1940	22 December 1941	UK	did not see combat	Regular Army	Durham and North Riding County	The brigade was formed when the No. 15 Infantry Training Group was redesignated. On 22 December 1941, the brigade was disbanded.	
216th Independent Infantry Brigade (Home)	17 October 1940	13 December 1941	UK	did not see combat	Regular Army	Northumberland County	On 13 December 1941, the brigade was disbanded.	
217th Independent Infantry Brigade (Home)	20 October 1940	22 December 1941	UK	did not see combat	Regular Army	Durham and North Riding County	On 22 December 1941, the brigade was disbanded.	
218th Independent Infantry Brigade (Home)	21 October 1940	10 November 1942	UK	did not see combat	Regular Army	Yorkshire County	On 22 December 1941, the brigade was redesignated as the 218th Independent Infantry Brigade. On 10 November 1942, the brigade was disbanded.	
219th Independent Infantry Brigade (Home)	26 October 1940	11 December 1942	UK	did not see combat	Regular Army	43rd (Wessex), 44th (Home Counties)	On 1 December 1941, the brigade was redesignated as the 219th Independent Infantry Brigade. On 11 December 1942, the brigade was disbanded.	
220th Independent Infantry Brigade (Home)	1 November 1940	17 November 1944	UK	did not see combat	Regular Army	Norfolk County, 47th Infantry (Reserve), 76th Infantry	On 18 November 1941, the brigade was redesignated as the 220th Infantry Brigade. It was redesignated as the 141st Infantry Brigade on 17 November 1944.	
221st Independent Infantry Brigade (Home)	8 November 1940	22 December 1941	UK	did not see combat	Regular Army	Yorkshire County	On 22 December 1941, the brigade was disbanded.	
222nd Independent Infantry Brigade (Home)	31 October 1940	18 November 1943	UK	did not see combat	Regular Army	Norfolk County, 76th Infantry	On 18 November 1941, the brigade was redesignated as the 222nd Infantry Brigade. On 18 November 1943, the brigade was disbanded.	
223rd Independent Infantry Brigade (Home)	17 October 1940	7 November 1942	UK	did not see combat	Regular Army	Essex County, 15th (Scottish)	On 27 November 1941, the brigade was redesignated as the 223rd Infantry Brigade. On 7 November 1942, the brigade was converted into the 3rd Parachute Brigade.	
224th Independent Infantry Brigade (Home)	10 October 1940	22 December 1941	UK	did not see combat	Regular Army	Durham and North Riding County	On 22 December 1941, the brigade was disbanded.	
225th Independent Infantry Brigade (Home)	14 November 1940	1 December 1941	UK	did not see combat	Regular Army	Northumberland County	On 1 December 1941, the brigade was converted into the 35th Army Tank Brigade.	
226th Independent Infantry Brigade (Home)	11 January 1941	1 December 1941	UK	did not see combat	Regular Army	Dorset County	On 1 December 1941, the brigade was converted into the 36th Army Tank Brigade.	
227th Independent Infantry Brigade (Home)	15 February 1941	N/A	UK, France, Belgium, Netherlands, Germany	Normandy, Allied advance from Paris to the Rhine, Western Allied invasion of Germany	Regular Army	15th (Scottish)	On 1 December 1941, the brigade was redesignated as the 227th Independent Infantry Brigade. On 14 July 1943, the brigade was redesignated as the 227th Infantry Brigade. It was also known as the 227th (Highland) Infantry Brigade. It ended the war in Germany.	
228th Independent Infantry Brigade	12 October 1942	16 September 1943	UK	did not see combat	Regular Army	N/A	The brigade was formed when Headquarters Shetland Defences was redesignated. On 16 September 1943, the brigade was disbanded.	
231st Infantry Brigade	1 April 1943	N/A	Egypt, Italy, UK, France, Belgium, Netherlands	Allied invasion of Sicily, Italy, Normandy, Allied advance from Paris to the Rhine, Western Allied invasion of Germany	Regular Army	50th (Northumbrian)	The brigade was formed, as a brigade group, when the 1st (Malta) Infantry Brigade was redesignated. On 24 September 1943, it ceased operating as a brigade group. During December 1944, the brigade arrived in the UK and became a training unit, where it ended the war.	
232nd Infantry Brigade	1 April 1943	13 November 1943	Malta, Egypt	did not see combat	Regular Army	N/A	Formed when the 2nd (Malta) Infantry Brigade was redesignated. On 13 November 1943, the brigade was disbanded in Egypt.	
233rd Infantry Brigade	1 April 1943	N/A	Malta	did not see combat	Regular Army	N/A	Formed when the 3rd (Malta) Infantry Brigade was redesignated, and after the Siege of Malta had ended. The brigade remained on the island for the duration of the war.	
234th Infantry Brigade	1 April 1943	16 January 1944	Malta, Egypt, Palestine, Greece	Dodecanese	Regular Army	N/A	Formed when the 4th (Malta) Infantry Brigade was redesignated. Most of the brigade was captured during the Dodecanese campaign on 16 November 1943; and the remnants of the brigade was disbanded in Egypt on 16 January 1944.	
301st Infantry Brigade	15 January 1945	N/A	UK, Netherlands, Germany	Western Allied invasion of Germany	Regular Army	N/A	Ended the war in Germany.	
302nd Infantry Brigade	15 January 1945	7 March 1945	UK	did not see combat	Regular Army	N/A	On 7 March 1945, the brigade was disbanded in the UK.	
303rd Infantry Brigade	22 January 1945	N/A	UK, Norway	did not see combat	Regular Army	61st Infantry	The brigade was formed when the 27th Anti-Aircraft Brigade was redesignated. The brigade ended the war in Norway.	
304th Infantry Brigade	22 January 1945	N/A	UK, Norway	did not see combat	Regular Army	55th (West Lancashire)	The brigade was formed when the 38th Anti-Aircraft Brigade was redesignated. The brigade ended the war in Norway.	
305th Infantry Brigade	22 January 1945	N/A	UK, Germany	did not see combat	Regular Army	55th (West Lancashire)	The brigade was formed when the 49th Anti-Aircraft Brigade was redesignated. The brigade ended the war in Germany.	
306th Infantry Brigade	22 January 1945	N/A	UK, Germany	did not see combat	Regular Army	N/A	The brigade was formed when the 55th Anti-Aircraft Brigade was redesignated. The brigade ended the war in Germany.	
307th Infantry Brigade	22 January 1945	N/A	UK, Germany	did not see combat	Regular Army	N/A	The brigade was formed when the 59th Anti-Aircraft Brigade was redesignated. The brigade ended the war in Germany.	
308th Infantry Brigade	22 January 1945	N/A	UK, Netherlands, Germany	did not see combat	Regular Army	N/A	The brigade was formed when the 61st Anti-Aircraft Brigade was redesignated. The brigade ended the war in Germany.	

== Named infantry brigades ==
Named infantry brigades
Formation name	Existing or date created	Date ceased to exist	Location(s) served	Notable campaign(s)	Branch	Division(s) mostly associated with	Notes	Source(s)
Adriatic Brigade	10 November 1944	8 April 1945	Yugoslavia	did not see combat	Regular Army	N/A	The brigade was formed when the Vis Brigade was redesignated. The brigade was disbanded on 8 April 1945.	
Cairo Brigade	Existing	20 September 1939	Egypt	did not see combat	Regular Army	N/A	On 20 September 1939, the brigade was redesignated as the 29th Infantry Brigade.	
Canal Brigade	Existing	20 September 1939	Egypt	did not see combat	Regular Army	N/A	On 20 September 1939, it was redesignated as the 23rd Infantry Brigade.	
Central Infantry Brigade	27 July 1941	14 July 1942	Malta	Siege of Malta	Regular Army	N/A	The brigade was formed in Malta from troops that had just arrived from the UK. On 14 July 1942, the brigade was redesignated as the 3rd (Malta) Infantry Brigade.	
Hong Kong Infantry Brigade	Existing	25 December 1941	Hong Kong	Battle of Hong Kong	Regular Army	N/A	The brigade consisted of British regular forces based in Hong Kong, and locally recruited forces. It was joined by British Indian Army units and a Canadian contingent prior to the Battle of Hong Kong. Following the conclusion of the battle, it was captured by Japan.	
Jewish Infantry Brigade Group	28 September 1944	N/A	Egypt, Italy, Germany	Italy	Regular Army	N/A	Formed from Jewish troops of the Palestine Regiment. In July 1945, the brigade travelled by road, from Italy, to join the 21st Army Group in Germany.	
Kowloon Infantry Brigade	16 November 1941	25 December 1941	Hong Kong	Battle of Hong Kong	Regular Army	N/A	The brigade was formed with a mixture of British regular forces based in Hong Kong, and British Indian Army battalions. Following the conclusion of the Battle of Hong Kong, it was captured by Japan.	
Malta Infantry Brigade	Existing	7 August 1940	Malta	Siege of Malta	Regular Army	N/A	On 7 August 1940, the brigade was redesignated as the Southern Infantry Brigade and remained based in Malta.	
Northern Infantry Brigade	7 August 1940	14 July 1942	Malta	Siege of Malta	Regular Army	N/A	The brigade was formed in Malta from British battalions based on the island. On 14 July 1942, the brigade was redesignated as the 2nd (Malta) Infantry Brigade	
Southern Infantry Brigade	7 August 1940	14 July 1942	Malta	Siege of Malta	Regular Army	N/A	The brigade was formed when the Malta Infantry Brigade was redesignated. On 14 July 1942, the brigade was redesignated as the 1st (Malta) Infantry Brigade	
Vis Brigade	16 August 1944	10 November 1944	Yugoslavia	did not see combat	Regular Army	N/A	The brigade was formed to defend the island of Vis, in the Adriatic Sea, so that the island could be used to support the Yugoslav partisans. On 10 November 1944, the brigade was redesignated as the Adriatic Brigade.	
Western Infantry Brigade	13 May 1942	14 July 1942	Malta	Siege of Malta	Regular Army	N/A	The brigade was formed in Malta from British battalions based on the island. On 14 July 1942, the brigade was redesignated as the 4th (Malta) Infantry Brigade	

== See also ==
- British Army during the Second World War
- British deception formations in World War II
- British infantry brigades of the First World War
- List of British infantry brigades of the Second World War (1–100)

== Notes ==
Footnotes

Citations
