= 21st (East Africa) Infantry Brigade =

1st (East Africa) Infantry Brigade 21st (East Africa) Infantry Brigade
- Active: 31 August 1939–?
- Country: United Kingdom
- Type: Infantry
- Size: Brigade; Brigade group

The 21st (East Africa) Infantry Brigade was a brigade sized formation of the British Army, which was founded on 31 August 1939 in British East Africa. The brigade was initially called the 1st (East Africa) Infantry Brigade, but was redesignated on 18 October 1940 as the 21st (East Africa) Infantry Brigade. The brigade was composed of units from the King's African Rifles and the Northern Rhodesia Regiment.

During the Second World War, the brigade formed part of the 1st, 11th, and the 2nd (African) Division. The division also spent time attached to the 1st South African and the 34th Indian Infantry Divisions. The brigade took part in the East African, and the Burma Campaigns. It ended the war based inside British India.

== General officers commanding ==
The brigade had the following commanders, during the Second World War.

Appointed	Brigadier
31 August 1939	Brigadier J. A. Campbell
19 October 1939	Brigadier D. M. Barchard
27 January 1941	Lieutenant-Colonel P. R. M. Mundy (acting)
6 February 1941	Brigadier Alan MacDougall Ritchie
4 September 1941	Lieutenant-Colonel P. R. M. Mundy (acting)
5 October 1941	Lieutenant-Colonel B. C. Lynn-Allen (acting)
7 November 1941	Brigadier Alan MacDougall Ritchie
16 June 1943	Lieutenant-Colonel H. M. Ingledew (acting)
26 June 1943	Lieutenant-Colonel H. N. Drake (acting)
10 August 1943	Brigadier William Dimoline
30 October 1943	Lieutenant-Colonel H. P. L. Glass (acting)
11 November 1943	Lieutenant-Colonel P. E. D. Watson (acting)
8 January 1944	Brigadier J. F. MacNab
8 March 1945	Lieutenant-Colonel P. A. Morcombe (acting)
12 April 1945	Brigadier J. F. MacNab
5 June 1945	Lieutenant-Colonel R. C. H. Miers (acting)
5 July 1945	Brigadier J. F. MacNab

== Order of battle ==
1st (East Africa) Brigade (until 18 October 1940)

- 3rd Battalion, King's African Rifles (KAR) (until 17 December 1939)
- 4th Battalion, KAR (until 2 May 1940)
- 5th Battalion, KAR (until 11 October 1939)
- 2nd Battalion, KAR (from 28 October 1939, until 29 June 1940)
- 1st Battalion, Northern Rhodesia Regiment (from 9 February 1940, until 9 May 1940)
- 2/4th Battalion, KAR (from 26 June 1940, until 30 September 1940)
- 1/4th Battalion, KAR (from 24 July 1940)
- 4th Battalion (Uganda), KAR (from 24 July 1940)
- 2/6th Battalion, KAR (from 17 August 1940, until 1 October 1940)
- 1/2nd Battalion, KAR (from 9 October 1940)

21st (East Africa) Brigade (from 18 October 1940)

- 1/4th Battalion, KAR
- 1st Battalion, Northern Rhodesia Regiment (from 21 November 1940)
- 1/4th Battalion, KAR (until 31 May 1943)
- 4th Battalion (Uganda), KAR
- 1/2nd Battalion, KAR (until 31 May 1943)
- 2nd Battalion (Tanganyika), KAR (from 1 June 1943)

Between January 1942 and July 1943, the brigade operated as a brigade group and commanded the following units:

- 54th (East Africa) Field Battery, East African Artillery (until 30 April 1942 until 30 April 1942)
- 53rd (East Africa) Field Battery, East African Artillery (from 9 March 1942 until 30 April 1942)
- 162nd (East Africa) Field Regiment, East African Artillery (from 1 May 1942)
- 303rd (East Africa) Field Regiment, East African Artillery (from 1 May 1942)
- 58th (East Africa) Field Company, East African Engineers (from 9 March 1942)
- 21st (East Africa) Infantry Brigade Group Company, East Africa Army Service Corps
- 2nd (Zanzibar) Field Ambulance, Royal Medical Corps
