= 25th (East Africa) Infantry Brigade =

5th (East Africa) Infantry Brigade 25th (East Africa) Infantry Brigade
- Active: 11 October 1940–?
- Country: United Kingdom
- Type: Infantry
- Size: Brigade; Brigade group

The 25th (East Africa) Infantry Brigade was a brigade sized formation of the British Army, which was founded on 11 October 1940 in British East Africa. The brigade was initially called the 5th (East Africa) Infantry Brigade, but was redesignated on 18 October 1940 as the 25th (East Africa) Infantry Brigade. The brigade was composed of units from the King's African Rifles.

During the Second World War, the brigade formed part of the 11th (African), the 12th (African), and the 11th (East Africa) Divisions. The division also spent time attached various corps-level formations. The brigade took part in the Burma Campaign, and ended the war based in British India.

== General officers commanding ==
The brigade had the following commanders, during the Second World War.

Appointed	Brigadier
11 October 1940	Brigadier W. Owen
3 September 1941	Brigadier W. A. L. James
6 May 1943	Brigadier J. B. Bettington
13 May 1944	Brigadier N. C. Hendriks
30 November 1944	Lieutenant-Colonel Thomas Henry Scott Galletly (acting)
7 December 1944	Brigadier G. H. Cree

== Order of battle ==
25th (East Africa) Infantry Brigade

- 2/3rd Battalion, King's African Rifles (KAR) (until 4 July 1942)
- 3/4th Battalion, KAR (until 2 January 1941, then from 18 June 1941 until 22 July 1942, then from 7 January 1943)
- 34th Battalion (Uganda), KAR (from 1 June 1943)
- 4/4th Battalion, KAR (until 3 January 1941)
- 3/6th Battalion, KAR (until 3 January 1941)
- 2/4th Battalion, KAR (until 29 June 1942)
- 2/6th Battalion, KAR (from 5 July 1942 until 18 September 1942, then from 20 February 1943 until 31 May 1943)
- 26th Battalion (Tanganyika Territory), KAR (from 1 June 1943)
- 11th Battalion, KAR (from 16 December 1942 until 31 May 1943)
- 11th Battalion (Kenya), KAR (from 1 June 1943)
- 13th Battalion (Nyasaland), KAR (from 3 April 1945)
