= 302nd Brigade =

302nd Brigade may refer to:

- 302nd Anti-aircraft Missile Brigade, Ukraine
- 302nd Brigade, Royal Field Artillery, United Kingdom
- 302nd Infantry Brigade, United Kingdom
- 302nd Maneuver Enhancement Brigade, United States

== See also ==
- 302nd Regiment (disambiguation)
