= 22nd (East Africa) Infantry Brigade =

2nd (East Africa) Infantry Brigade 22nd (East Africa) Infantry Brigade
- Active: 19 September 1939–?
- Country: United Kingdom
- Type: Infantry
- Size: Brigade; Brigade group

The 22nd (East Africa) Infantry Brigade was a brigade sized formation of the British Army, which was founded on 19 September 1939 at Colito Barracks in Dar es Salaam in British East Africa. The brigade was initially called the 2nd (East Africa) Infantry Brigade, but was redesignated on 18 October 1940 as the 22nd (East Africa) Infantry Brigade. The brigade was composed of units from the King's African Rifles, the Northern Rhodesia Regiment and the Rhodesian African Rifles.

During the Second World War, the brigade formed part of the 2nd, the 11th, the 12th (African) Divisions, and the 82nd (West Africa) Division. The division also spent time attached various Indian Army divisions and corps-level formations. The brigade took part in the East African, and the Burma Campaigns. It ended the war based in Burma.

== General officers commanding ==
The brigade had the following commanders, during the Second World War.

Appointed	Brigadier
19 September 1939	Brigadier Charles Christopher Fowkes
17 July 1940	Lieutenant-Colonel Colin Frederick Blackden (acting)
17 August 1940	Lieutenant-Colonel W. Owen (acting)
28 September 1939	Brigadier Charles Christopher Fowkes
3 March 1941	Lieutenant-Colonel Colin Frederick Blackden (acting)
10 March 1941	Brigadier Charles Christopher Fowkes
12 September 1941	Brigadier W. A. Ebsworth
1 April 1942	Brigadier William Dimoline
17 June 1942	Lieutenant-Colonel J. F. MacNab (acting)
8 July 1942	Brigadier William Dimoline
31 July 1942	Lieutenant-Colonel J. F. MacNab (acting)
7 August 1942	Brigadier William Dimoline
13 August 1942	Lieutenant-Colonel J. F. MacNab (acting)
20 August 1942	Brigadier William Dimoline
27 November 1942	Lieutenant-Colonel R. G. T. Collins (acting)
7 January 1943	Brigadier William Dimoline
8 June 1943	Lieutenant-Colonel P. A. Morcombe (acting)
10 July 1943	Brigadier William Dimoline
28 July 1943	Lieutenant-Colonel R. G. T. Collins (acting)
28 August 1943	Brigadier William N. C. Hendriks
19 April 1944	Lieutenant-Colonel R. Francis Jones (acting)
13 June 1944	Brigadier R. F. Johnstone
5 January 1945	Lieutenant-Colonel R. Francis Jones (acting)
14 January 1945	Brigadier R. F. Johnstone

== Order of battle ==
2nd (East Africa) Brigade (until 17 October 1940)

- 1st Battalion, King's African Rifles (KAR) (from 2 October 1939)
- 6th Battalion, KAR (from 6 October 1939)
- 5th Battalion, KAR (from 13 October 1939)

22nd (East Africa) Brigade (from 18 October 1940)

- 5th Battalion, KAR (until 31 May 1943)
- 5th Battalion (Kenya), KAR (from 1 June 1943, until 9 August 1944)
- 1/1st Battalion, KAR (until 31 May 1943)
- 1st Battalion (Nyasaland), KAR (from 1 June 1943)
- 1/6th Battalion, KAR (until 31 May 1943)
- 6th Battalion (Tanganyika Territory), KAR (from 1 June 1943 until 20 July 1943)
- 3rd Battalion, Northern Rhodesia Regiment (from 21 July 1943)
- 1st Battalion, Rhodesian African Rifles (from 14 September 1944)

From December 1941, the brigade operated as a brigade group and commanded the following units:

- 56th (Uganda) Field Battery, East African Artillery (from 27 April 1942 until 26 December 1942)
- 9th Field Regiment, Royal Artillery (from 9 June 1942 until 14 November 1942)
- 60th (East Africa) Field Company, East African Engineers (from 12 May 1942 until 1 July 1943)
- 59th (East Africa) Field Company, East African Engineers (from 8 July 1944)
- 22nd (East Africa) Infantry Brigade Group Company, East Africa Army Service Corps
- 2nd (Northern Rhodesia) Field Ambulance, Royal Medical Corps (until 17 February 1942)
- 5th (Kenya) Field Ambulance, Royal Medical Corps (from 9 March 1942 until 30 April 1944)
- 110th Camp Reception Station, Royal Medical Corps (from 10 July 1944 until 12 March 1945)
- 6th (East Africa) Infantry Brigade Workshop, East Africa Army Electrical Mechanical Engineers (from 7 December 1944)
- 22nd (East Africa) Infantry Brigade Provost Section
