= Thomas Henry Scott Galletly =

British Army officer

Brigadier Thomas Henry Scott Galletly DSO* MC
- Born: 23 August 1905; Hendon, Middlesex
- Died: 5 April 1972 (aged 66); Christchurch, Hampshire
- Military career
- Allegiance: United Kingdom
- Branch: British Army
- Rank: Brigadier
- Service number: 38636
- Unit: South Wales Borderers
- Awards: DSO&bar; Military Cross

Brigadier Thomas Henry Scott Galletly DSO & Bar MC (23 August 1905 – 5 April 1972) was a senior officer in the British Army during the Second World War. He was Commanding Officer of the 28th (East Africa) Infantry Brigade in Burma between 21 February 1945 and 1 June 1945, the 27th (East Africa) Infantry Brigade between 30 May 1945 and 14 June 1945 and, from 18 July 1945, was Commanding Officer of the 27th (East Africa) Infantry Brigade.

== Career ==
Thomas Henry Scott Galletly was born on 23 August 1905 in Hendon, Middlesex, the son of Thomas Galletly of Normanton, Rutland and Edith Galletly of Sharnbrook, Bedfordshire. He was educated at Bedford Modern School and Sandhurst.

During the Second World War, he served in Abyssinia (1941) and Madagascar (1942). He served as Acting Commanding Officer of the 27th (N Rhodesia) Infantry Brigade in Madagascar (1943), the 25th (East Africa) Infantry Brigade in Burma (1944) and the 26th (East Africa) Infantry Brigade in Burma (16 January 1945 to 15 February 1945). He was Commanding Officer of the 28th (East Africa) Infantry Brigade in Burma between 21 February 1945 and 1 June 1945, the 27th (East Africa) Infantry Brigade between 30 May 1945 and 14 June 1945 and, from 18 July 1945, he was Commanding Officer of the 27th (East Africa) Infantry Brigade. He was a Commander of the 1st Brigade, Arab League under Lieutenant-General Sir John Bagot Glubb.

During the East African Campaign he was awarded the Military Cross. In March 1945 he was awarded an immediate Distinguished Service Order (DSO) for action in Burma. Later the same year he added a bar to the DSO for the following action: 'While in command of a detached column with orders to cut the enemy's lines of communication in the Myitha Gorge, he carried out his mission in the face of determined opposition, and by maintaining an isolated position for three days, materially contributed to the liquidation of the enemy's defences at Kalewa'.

Galletly was a rugby union player, and scored 19 tries in 27 matches for Bedford between 1923 and 1927. He died in Christchurch, Hampshire on 5 April 1972.
