= Charles Fowkes =

British Army general (1894–1966)

Major-General Charles Fowkes CBE DSO MC CPM
- Born: 4 December 1894; Lewisham, Kent, England
- Died: 1 July 1966 (aged 71); Malindi, Kenya
- Military career
- Allegiance: United Kingdom
- Branch: British Army
- Service years: 1914–1946
- Rank: Major-General
- Nickname: "Fluffy"
- Unit: South Wales Borderers
- Commands: 11th (East Africa) Division (1943–44); 12th African Division (1942–43); 12th African Division (1941–42); 22nd (East Africa) Infantry Brigade (1940–41); 2nd (East Africa) Infantry Brigade (1939–40); Southern Brigade (1936–39)
- Conflicts: First World War; Second World War
- Awards: Commander of the Order of the British Empire; Distinguished Service Order; Military Cross; Colonial Police Medal; Mentioned in Despatches (4)

Major-General Charles Christopher Fowkes, CBE, DSO, MC, CPM (4 December 1894 – 1 July 1966) was an officer in the British Army during the Second World War. His nickname was "Fluffy."

== Military career ==
Fowkes was born in Lewisham, Kent, England, on 4 December 1894. He was educated at Dulwich College and the Royal Military College, Sandhurst. He was commissioned in the South Wales Borderers, at the start of the First World War. He was awarded the Military Cross in 1918 and was wounded four times throughout the war. The citation for his Military Cross, appearing in The London Gazette in September 1918, reads as follows:

For conspicuous gallantry and devotion to duty. Under a heavy enemy attack on his company he stuck to his work after being early wounded, and under very trying circumstances set splendid example to his men.

Fowkes then served in the North Russia intervention during the Russian Civil War.

Fowkes was highly critical of fascism; during the 1930s he criticised both Hitler's Nazi government and Mussolini's Fascist regime in Italy. Brigadier Fowkes participated in the East African Campaign, commanding the 22nd (East Africa) Infantry Brigade, part of Lieutenant-General Alan Cunningham's force based in Kenya. In August 1941 he was placed in temporary command of the 12th African Division and was confirmed in the role the following month. In November he led his division, supported by Ethiopian patriot forces in the final action of the East African campaign, the capture of Gondar on 27 November.

After the campaign Fowkes remained in East Africa on garrison duties until April 1943 when he was appointed to command 11th (East Africa) Division. It had been felt by the British authorities that African soldiers would be well suited to jungle warfare and so the division was sent in June 1943 to Ceylon for training and then in June 1944 to Burma to join Indian XXXIII Corps and take part in the Burma Campaign. From then until December, fighting in horrendous terrain through the monsoon (because African soldiers were thought to be less susceptible to malaria – which proved to be the case), the division fought in the notorious Kabaw Valley and cleared the west bank of the Chindwin river establishing three bridgeheads for Fourteenth Army on the other side. The division was then withdrawn to India to regroup and rest. Fowkes fell ill and was sent on leave at the end of 1944 to recuperate. Neither the division nor Fowkes saw any further action during the war and Fowkes retired from the army shortly after the war ended.

Fowkes was promoted to major-general in 1941. He received the Distinguished Service Order for his efforts in the East African Campaign.

Fowkes retired to Britain's Kenya Colony in December 1945. He lived on a ranch just outside of what has since become Amboseli National Park; he could see Mount Kilimanjaro from his property and he was said to be particularly fond of "watching the elephants". In the 1954 Birthday Honours, as inspector general of the Kenya Police Reserve, he received the Colonial Police Medal. He died in 1966 in Malindi, Kenya, aged 71.

== Bibliography ==
- Mead, Richard (2007). Churchill's Lions: a biographical guide to the key British generals of World War II. Stroud (UK): Spellmount. ISBN 978-1-86227-431-0.
- Smart, Nick (2005). Biographical Dictionary of British Generals of the Second World War. Barnsley, South Yorkshire: Pen and Sword Books. ISBN 1844150496.
