= 27th (N Rhodesia) Infantry Brigade =

7th (N Rhodesia) Infantry Brigade 27th (N Rhodesia) Infantry Brigade 27th (East Africa) Infantry Brigade
- Active: 18 September 1940–?
- Country: United Kingdom
- Type: Infantry
- Size: Brigade; Brigade group

The 27th (N Rhodesia) Infantry Brigade was a brigade-sized formation of the British Army, which was founded on 18 September 1940 in Northern Rhodesia. (Note: The brigade name is as displayed in Joslen's work on British Army formations, which does not use "north" or "northern" within the title.) The brigade was initially called the 7th (N Rhodesia) Infantry Brigade, but was redesignated on 3 October 1940 as the 27th (N Rhodesia) Infantry Brigade. In April 1945, the brigade was redesignated as the 27th (East Africa) Infantry Brigade.

The brigade was composed of units, initially, from the Northern Rhodesia Regiment. The brigade later included units from the King's African Rifles and the Mauritius Regiment. During the Second World War, the brigade formed part of various corps-sized commands and was deployed to East Africa and the Union of South Africa in a non-combat role. The brigade also took part in the Battle of Madagascar.

== General officers commanding ==
The brigade had the following commanders, during the Second World War.

Appointed	Brigadier
18 September 1940	Brigadier G. Dawes
27 October 1941	Brigadier J. S. Hewick
27 May 1942	Lieutenant-Colonel H. G. Veasey (acting)
2 June 1942	Colonel G. G. Johnson (acting)
19 June 1942	Brigadier Colin Frederick Blackden
28 June 1942	Brigadier R. E. Hobday
10 February 1943	Lieutenant-Colonel Thomas Henry Scott Galletly (acting)
2 March 1943	Brigadier R. E. Hobday
17 November 1943	Lieutenant-Colonel P. A. Morcombe (acting)
3 January 1944	Brigadier William Fox-Pitt
28 August 1944	Lieutenant-Colonel J. G. Mileham (acting)
11 September 1944	Brigadier William Fox-Pitt
18 May 1945	Lieutenant-Colonel V. K. H. Channer (acting)
21 May 1945	Lieutenant-Colonel A. F. G. Monro (acting)
30 May 1945	Brigadier Thomas Henry Scott Galletly
14 June 1945	Lieutenant-Colonel J. E. D. Watson (acting)
18 July 1945	Brigadier Thomas Henry Scott Galletly

== Order of battle ==
The brigade was composed of the following units:

- 2nd Battalion, Northern Rhodesia Regiment (NRR)
- 3rd Battalion, NRR (until 20 July 1943)
- 4th Battalion, NRR (from 26 November 1940 until 26 February 1943)
- 2/3rd Battalion, King's African Rifles (KAR; from 26 February 1943 until 31 May 1943)
- 3rd Battalion (Kenya), KAR (from 1 June 1945)
- 6th Battalion (Tanganyika Territory), KAR (from 21 July 1943)
- 1st Battalion, Mauritius Regiment (from 20 December 1943 until 28 June 1944)
- 21st Battalion (Nyasaland), KAR (from 1 December 1944)
- 27th (Northern Rhodesia) Infantry Brigade Group Company, East Africa Army Service Corps (remained with the brigade after it ceased being a brigade group)
- 4th Infantry Brigade Workshop, East Africa Army Electrical Mechanical Engineers (remained with the brigade after it ceased being a brigade group)

Between April 1942 and April 1945, the brigade operated as a brigade group and commanded the following units:

- 4th East Africa Armoured Car Regiment (from 15 November 1944)
- 55th (Tanganyika) Light Battery, East African Artillery (until 23 November 1942)
- 57th (East Africa) Field Battery, East African Artillery (from 19 December 1942, until 26 December 1942)
- 59th (East Africa) Field Company, East African Engineers (until 7 June 1943)
- 31st (Nyasaland) Independent Machine Gun Company, KAR (from 24 July 1944 until 31 October 1944)
- 31st Battalion (Nyasaland), KAR (from 20 November 1944)
- 41st Battalion (Nyasaland), KAR (from 20 November 1944)
- 27th (Northern Rhodesia) Infantry Brigade Group Company, East Africa Army Service Corps (until 23 July 1944)
- 7th (Northern Rhodesia) Field Ambulance, Royal Medical Corps
- 4th Infantry Brigade Workshop, East Africa Army Electrical Mechanical Engineers (from 16 September 1944)

== See also ==
- Bibliography of the history of Zambia § Colonial Rhodesia era

== Notes ==
Footnotes

Citations
