= 2nd Gibraltar Brigade =

The 2nd Gibraltar Brigade was a British Army garrison brigade during the Second World War.

== History ==
After serving as part of the Garrison of Gibraltar from 24 April 1941 to 1 December 1943, it was redesignated as the 28th Infantry Brigade and as such saw action in and Italy as part of the 4th Infantry Division with the British Eighth Army. From December 1944 through to August 1945 the 28th Infantry Brigade served in Greece during the Greek Civil War with Lieutenant General Ronald Scobie's III Corps.

== Formation ==
=== As 2nd Gibraltar Brigade ===
- 2nd Battalion, Somerset Light Infantry
- 4th Battalion, Devonshire Regiment
- 7th Battalion, King's Own Royal Regiment (Lancaster)
- 1st Battalion, Bedfordshire and Hertfordshire Regiment
- 2nd Battalion, King's Regiment (Liverpool)

=== As 28th Infantry Brigade ===
- 2nd Battalion, King's Regiment (Liverpool)
- 2nd Battalion, Somerset Light Infantry
- 1st Battalion, Argyll and Sutherland Highlanders
- 2/4th Battalion, Hampshire Regiment
