= 11th (East Africa) Division =

- Formation sign of the 11th (East Africa) Division (second pattern)
- Active: 1943–1945
- Country: United Kingdom
- Branch: British Colonial Auxiliary Forces
- Type: Infantry
- Size: Division
- Part of: Fourteenth Army
- Engagements: Second World War: Burma Campaign

The 11th (East Africa) Infantry Division was a British infantry division consisting of troops from the British Colonial Auxiliary Forces which was formed in February 1943 during World War II. Consisting of East African troops, the division fought in the Burma campaign.

== Formation ==
In 1943, the 11th (East Africa) Division was formed primarily of troops from British East Africa. The division should not be confused with the earlier 11th (African) Division which was composed of brigades both from British East Africa and from Nigeria in British West Africa, fought in the East African Campaign and was disbanded in late 1941.

== Combat history ==
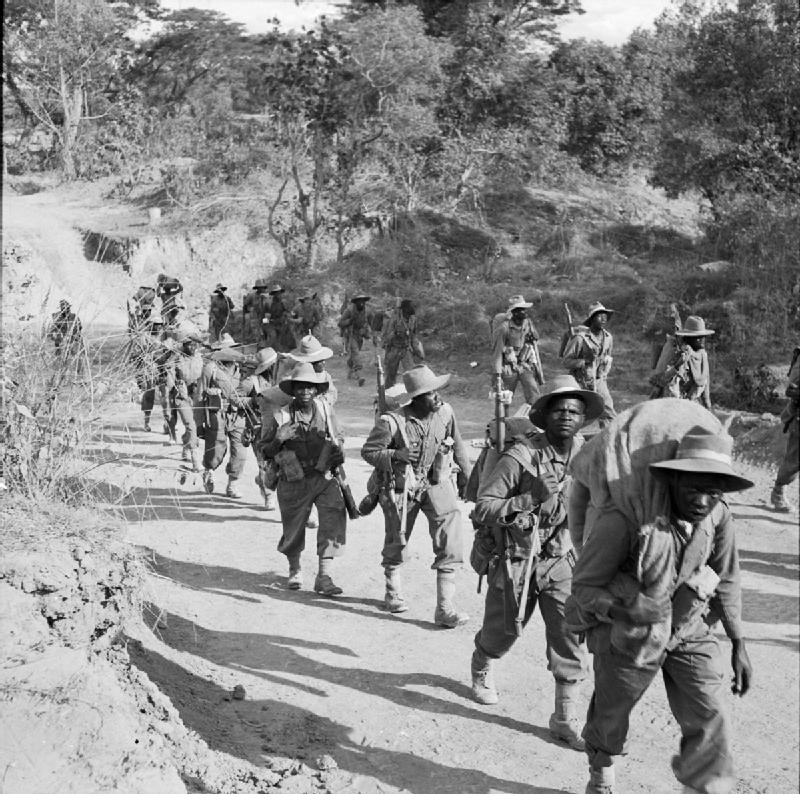
Men of the 11th Division on the road to Kalewa, Burma after crossing the Chindwin River, 1945

The Division was composed of troops from Kenya, Uganda, Nyasaland, Tanganyika, Southern Rhodesia, Northern Rhodesia, and from Belgian Congo. The 11th (East Africa) Division fought with the Fourteenth Army in Burma during the Burma Campaign. In the later part of 1944, the division pursued the Japanese retreating from Imphal down the Kabaw valley and established bridgeheads over the Chindwin River. In 1945, elements of the division played a part in the Battle of Meiktila and Mandalay.

== Commanding officers ==
- Major-General Charles Christopher Fowkes (February 1943 – December 1944)
- Major-General Robert Mansergh (January 1945 – February 1945)
- Major-General William Dimoline (March 1945 – August 1945)

== Order of battle ==
=== 21st East African Brigade ===
Under Brig. J. F. Macnab:

- 2nd (Nyasaland) Battalion, King's African Rifles
- 4th (Uganda) Battalion, King's African Rifles
- 1st Battalion, Nigeria Regiment
- 1st Battalion, Northern Rhodesia Regiment

=== 25th East African Brigade ===
Under Brig. N. C. Hendricks:

- 11th (Kenya) Battalion, King's African Rifles
- 26th (Tanganyika) Battalion, King's African Rifles
- 34th (Uganda) Battalion, King's African Rifles
- 1st Battalion, Rhodesia Regiment

=== 26th East African Brigade ===
Under Brig. V. K. H. Channer (to 18 November 1944), and Brig. A. P. Walsh (from 18 November 1944):

- 22nd (Nyasaland) Battalion, King's African Rifles
- 36th (Tanganyika) Battalion, King's African Rifles
- 44th (Uganda) Battalion, King's African Rifles
- 1st Battalion, Rhodesian African Rifles (later 22nd East African Brigade, XV Indian Corps)

=== Divisional units ===
- 5th Battalion, King's African Rifles (divisional reconnaissance unit)
- 13th Battalion, King's African Rifles (HQ defence unit)
- 10th (Belgian Congo) Casualty Clearing Station

=== Divisional artillery ===
Under CRA Brig. J. V. D. Radford:

- 302nd East African Field Regiment
- 303rd East African Field Regiment
- 304th East African Field Regiment

=== Divisional engineers ===
- 34th East African Field Company
- 58th East African Field Company
- 64th East African Field Company
- 62nd East African Field Park Company

=== Divisional signals ===
- 11th East African Divisional Signals

== See also ==
- List of British Empire divisions in the Second World War
- Battle of Meiktila and Mandalay
- 1st SA Infantry Division
