= 1st (African) Division =

1st (African) Division 11th (African) Division
- Formation sign of the 11th (Africa) Division.
- Active: 24 July 1940 –
- Disbanded: 23 November 1941
- Part of: East Africa Command
- Engagements: East African Campaign

Commanders
- 24 July 1940 – 13 August 1940: Brigadier G. R. Smallwood (acting Commanding Officer)
- 1940 – 23 November 1941: Major-General H. E. de R. Wetherall 13 August

The 1st (African) Division was a British Empire colonial unit during the Second World War. The division was formed on 24 July 1940 in East Africa. On 24 November of that year, the division was re-designated as the British Army's 11th (African) Division. The division were composed primarily of West African and East African troops. It was disbanded on 23 November 1941 and its component units reassigned.

The division should not be confused with 11th (East Africa) Division which was raised in 1943 using solely East African units and which fought in Burma.

== Background ==
In 1938, the King's African Rifles (KAR) in Kenya had been composed of 2 brigade-strength units organized as a Northern Brigade and a Southern Brigade. The combined strength of both units amounted to 94 officers, 60 non-commissioned officers, and 2,821 African other ranks. After the outbreak of war, these units provided the trained nucleus for the rapid expansion of the KAR.

By March 1940, the strength of the KAR had reached 883 officers, 1,374 non-commissioned officers, and 20,026 African other ranks. The size of a KAR battalion was established at 36 officers, 44 non-commissioned officers and other ranks, and 1,050 African other ranks.

Initially the KAR deployed as the 1st East African Infantry Brigade and the 2nd East African Infantry Brigade. The first brigade was responsible for coastal defence and the second was responsible for the defence of the interior.

By the end of July, 2 additional East African brigades were formed, the 3rd East African Infantry Brigade and the 6th East African Infantry Brigade. Initially a Coastal Division and a Northern Frontier District Division were planned. But, instead, on 19 July, the 1st (African) Division and the 2nd (African) Division were formed. On 24 November, these divisions became the 11th African Division and the 12th African Division.

By July 1940, under the terms of a war contingency plan, the Royal West African Frontier Force provided 2 brigades for service in Kenya. One brigade was from the Gold Coast (Ghana) and one brigade was from Nigeria. The 1st (West Africa) Infantry Brigade, together with 2 East African brigades (KAR brigades) and some South Africans, formed 11th African Division. The 12th African Division had a similar formation with a Ghanaian brigade taking the place of a Nigerian brigade.

== Combat history ==
The 1st (African) Division fought in East Africa. Between 4 February to 26 February, during the East African Campaign, the division fought its only battle on the Juba. On 28 July 1941 the headquarters closed in Ethiopia, transferring to Nairobi, where it opened again on 20 August. It took command of new formations upon the transfer to Kenya. On 23 November 1941 the division headquarters ceased to exist.

== Commanding officers ==
- Brigadier G. R. Smallwood (acting Commanding Officer) 24 July 1940 to 13 August 1940
- Major-General H. E. de R. Wetherall 13 August 1940 to 23 November 1941

== Order of battle ==
=== On formation ===
On formation, as 1st (African) Division, 24 July to 24 November 1940.

- 1st (East African) Brigade
  - 1/4th Battalion, King's African Rifles
  - 2/6th Battalion, King's African Rifles (left 1 October 1940)
  - 1/2nd Battalion, King's African Rifles (from 9 October 1940)
  - 1st Battalion, Northern Rhodesia Regiment (from 21 November 1940)

Renamed the 21st (East Africa) Infantry Brigade on 18 November 1940.

- 23rd (Nigeria) Infantry Brigade
  - 1st Battalion, Nigeria Regiment
  - 2nd Battalion, Nigeria Regiment
  - 3rd Battalion, Nigeria Regiment
- Artillery
  - 1st (Nigeria) Light Battery, West African Artillery
- Engineers
  - 1st (Nigeria) Field Company, West African Engineers
  - 3rd (Gold Coast) Field Company, West African Engineers

Renamed the 51st and 53rd Field Companies, West African Engineers, respectively on 18 October 1940.

- Division Troops
  - 1st (African) Divisional Signals

Renamed 11th (African) Divisional Signals on 18 November 1940.

=== As 11th (African) Division ===
As the 11th (African) Division, in East Africa and, from 15 February to 16 March 1941, Italian Somaliland.

- 21st (East African) Brigade (left 27 February 1941)
  - 1/4th Battalion, King's African Rifles
  - 1/2nd Battalion, King's African Rifles
  - 1st Battalion, Northern Rhodesia Regiment
- 22nd (East Africa) Infantry Brigade(from 3 December 1940 to 8 January 1941; 23 February to 1 March 1941; 12 March 1941)
  - 5th Battalion, King's African Rifles
  - 1/1st Battalion, King's African Rifles
  - 1/6th Battalion, King's African Rifles

The brigade brought, and took, with it the 22nd Indian Mountain Battery and 54th (East African) Field Company, East African Engineers, see below

- 23rd (Nigeria) Infantry Brigade
  - 1st Battalion, Nigeria Regiment
  - 2nd Battalion, Nigeria Regiment
  - 3rd Battalion, Nigeria Regiment (left 12 March 1941)
- Artillery
  - 52nd (Nigeria) Light Battery, West African Artillery
  - 22nd Indian Mountain Battery (from 3 December 1940 to 8 January 1941; 23 February to 1 March 1941; 12 March 1941)
  - 53rd (East Africa) Light Battery, East African Artillery (from 6 February to 23 February 1941)
- Engineers
  - 51st (Nigeria) Field Company, West African Engineers
  - 53rd (Gold Coast) Field Company, West African Engineers (left 23 February 1941)
  - 54th (East Africa) Field Company, East African Engineers (from 3 December 1940 to 8 January 1941; 23 February to 1 March 1941; 12 March 1941)
- Division Troops
  - 11th (Africa) Divisional Signals

=== Abyssinia and after ===
From deployment in Abyssinia to the division's disbanding in East Africa on 23 November 1941.

- 21st (East African) Brigade (from 20 August 1941)
  - 1/4th Battalion, King's African Rifles
  - 1/2nd Battalion, King's African Rifles
  - 1st Battalion, Northern Rhodesia Regiment
- 22nd (East Africa) Infantry Brigade (left 26 July 1941)
  - 5th Battalion, King's African Rifles
  - 1/1st Battalion, King's African Rifles
  - 1/6th Battalion, King's African Rifles
- 23rd (Nigeria) Infantry Brigade (left 20 July 1941)
  - 1st Battalion, Nigeria Regiment
  - 2nd Battalion, Nigeria Regiment
- 28th (East Africa) Infantry Brigade (from 20 August to 2 October 1941)
  - 4/6th Battalion, King's African Rifles
  - 2/1st Battalion, King's African Rifles
  - 7th Battalion, King's African Rifles
- Artillery
  - 52nd (Nigeria) Light Battery, West African Artillery (left 20 July 1941)
  - 22nd Indian Mountain Battery (left 26 July 1941)
  - 18th Indian Mountain Battery (from 3 April to 26 July 1941)
- Engineers
  - 51st (Nigeria) Field Company, West African Engineers (left 20 July 1941)
  - 53rd (Gold Coast) Field Company, West African Engineers (from 20 August 1941)
  - 54th (East African) Field Company, East African Engineers (left 26 July 1941)
- Division Troops
  - 11th (African) Divisional Signals

== Headquarters ==
This is a list of higher formations British 1st (African) Division served under.

- Headquarters East Africa Force 24/07/40-14/09/41
- Headquarters East Africa Command 15/09/41-22/11/41

== See also ==
- King's African Rifles
- East African Campaign (World War II)
- 2nd (African) Division (United Kingdom)
- Order of Battle, East African Campaign (World War II)
- List of British Empire divisions in the Second World War
