= 117th Infantry Brigade Royal Marines =

- Formation sign of the 117th Infantry Brigade.
- Active: January to July 1945
- Country: United Kingdom
- Branch: Royal Navy
- Type: Infantry brigade
- Engagements: Second World War

The 117th Infantry Brigade Royal Marines was an infantry brigade formation of the Royal Marines created in the final stages of the Second World War.

== Unit history ==
The unit was one of two created to address the manpower shortage of 21st Army Group in early 1945. The brigade was created on 15 January 1945 from former members of the Royal Marines Division, which had been broken up in 1943 and the troops distributed to Marine Commandos, or retrained as landing craft crew. They were quickly re-mustered as regular infantry, organised as a standard Army brigade.

The Brigade was stationed in England until after the German surrender when it was moved forward to occupy the naval port of Kiel as part of VIII Corps, releasing 46th Highland Brigade for occupation duties elsewhere. The Brigade was tasked with guarding naval installations and overseeing the capitulation of German naval ships and personnel. It also had to deal with the arrival of ships carrying troops returning from the Eastern front, and also civilian refugees from Soviet-occupied Germany. On one particularly busy night this involved taking command of 21 destroyers and removing 14,000 soldiers from shipping. The Brigade returned to the UK in July 1945 to be disbanded.

== See also ==
- British brigades of the Second World War
