= 2nd (African) Division =

Division of the British Colonial Auxiliary Forces

2nd (African) Division; 12th (African) Division; 12th (East African) Division
- Formation sign of the 12th (African) Division
- Active: 19 July 1940 – 18 April 1943
- Country: Kenya; Nyasaland; Tanganyika; Uganda; Gold Coast
- Allegiance: British Empire
- Branch: British Colonial Auxiliary Forces
- Type: Infantry
- Size: Division
- Part of: East Africa Command
- Engagements: World War II; East African campaign

Commanders
- 19 September 1940: Major-general Alfred Reade Godwin-Austen
- 28 August 1941: Major-general Charles Christopher Fowkes

The 2nd (African) Division was a division of the British Colonial Auxiliary Forces which served in the Second World War. Raised on 19 July 1940 in the Kenya Colony, the division was redesignated as the 12th (African) Division on 24 November. In October 1941 the division began also being referred to as the 12th (East African) Division when the 24th (Gold Coast) Infantry Brigade was removed from the division and replaced with another East African brigade. The division served in the East African campaign before being disbanded in East Africa on 18 April 1943.

== Background ==
In 1938, the King's African Rifles (KAR) in Kenya had been composed of two brigade-strength units organized as a Northern Brigade and a Southern Brigade. The combined strength of both units amounted to 94 officers, 60 non-commissioned officers, and 2,821 African other ranks. After the outbreak of war, these units provided the trained nucleus for the rapid expansion of the KAR. By March 1940, the strength of the KAR had reached 883 officers, 1,374 non-commissioned officers, and 20,026 African other ranks. The size of a KAR battalion was established at 36 officers, 44 non-commissioned officers and other ranks, and 1,050 African other ranks.

Initially the KAR deployed as the 1st East African Infantry Brigade and the 2nd East African Infantry Brigade. The first brigade was responsible for coastal defense and the second was responsible for the defense of the interior. By the end of July, two additional East African brigades were formed, the 3rd East African Infantry Brigade and the 6th East African Infantry Brigade. Initially a Coastal Division and a Northern Frontier District Division were planned. But, instead, on 19 July, the 1st (African) Division and the 2nd (African) Division were formed. On 24 November, these divisions became the 11th African Division and the 12th African Division.

By July 1940, under the terms of a war contingency plan, the Royal West African Frontier Force provided two brigades for service in Kenya. One brigade was from the Gold Coast (Ghana) and one brigade was from Nigeria. The Nigerian brigade, together with two East African brigades (KAR brigades) and some South Africans, formed 11th African Division. The 12th African Division had a similar formation with a Ghanaian brigade taking the place of a Nigerian brigade.

== History ==
The 12th African Division was one of the three divisions under Lieutenant-general Alan Gordon Cunningham in Kenya. During the East African campaign, the 12th African Division attacked from Kenya into Italian Somaliland and then advanced into Ethiopia.

== Order of battle ==
=== On formation ===
On formation as 2nd (African) Division 19 July to 24 November 1940. The division was renamed as the 12th (African) Division on 18 October 1940.

- 2nd (East Africa) Infantry Brigade
  - 1st Battalion, King's African Rifles (as the 1/1st battalion after 17 October 1940)
  - 5th Battalion, King's African Rifles
  - 6th Battalion, King's African Rifles (as the 1/6th battalion after 17 October 1940)

Renamed the 22nd (East Africa) Infantry Brigade on 18 October 1940

- 4th (Gold Coast) Infantry Brigade
  - 1st Battalion, Gold Coast Regiment
  - 2nd Battalion, Gold Coast Regiment
  - 3rd Battalion, Gold Coast Regiment

Renamed the 24th (Gold Coast) Infantry Brigade on 18 October 1940.

- Artillery
  - 1st (Gold Coast) Light Battery, West African Artillery
  - 22nd Indian Mountain Battery

The 1st (Gold Coast) Light Battery was renamed the 51st (Gold Coast) Light Battery on 18 October 1940.

- Engineers
  - 1st (East Africa) Field Company, East African Engineers
  - 2nd (Gold Coast) Field Company, West African Engineers

Renamed the 54th (East Africa) Field Company, East African Engineers and 52nd (Gold Coast) Field Company, West African Engineers respectively on 18 October 1940.

- Division troops
  - 2nd (African) Division Signals

Renamed the 12th (African) Division Signals on 18 October 1940.

=== As 12th (African) Division ===
As the 12th (African) Division in East Africa and, from 10 February to 6 April 1941, Italian Somaliland, fighting in the Juba in February 1941.

- 22nd (East Africa) Infantry Brigade (left 12 December 1940, rejoined 6 January 1941, left 23 February, rejoined 2 March 1941, left 11 March, swapping with 11th (African) Division)
  - 1/1st Battalion, King's African Rifles
  - 5th Battalion, King's African Rifles
  - 1/6th Battalion, King's African Rifles
- 24th (Gold Coast) Infantry Brigade
  - 1st Battalion, Gold Coast Regiment
  - 2nd Battalion, Gold Coast Regiment
  - 3rd Battalion, Gold Coast Regiment
- Artillery
  - 51st (Gold Coast) Light Battery, West African Artillery
  - 53rd (East Africa )Light Battery, East African Artillery
  - 22nd Indian Mountain Battery (left 2 December 1940, rejoined 8 January to 22 February 1941)
- Engineers
  - 52nd (Gold Coast) Field Company, West African Engineers
  - 54th (East Africa) Field Company, East African Engineers (left 2 December 1940, rejoined 8 January to 23 February 1941)
  - 53rd (Gold Coast) Field Company, West African Engineers (joined 23 to 27 February 1941)
- Division troops
  - 12th (African) Division Signals

=== Abyssinia and after ===
From the division's deployment to Abyssinia to its disbanding on 17 April 1943, fighting at Gondar in October and November 1941.

- 22nd (East Africa) Infantry Brigade (rejoined 27 July 1941 left 22 December 1941)
  - 1/1st Battalion, King's African Rifles
  - 5th Battalion, King's African Rifles
  - 1/6th Battalion, King's African Rifles
- 24th (Gold Coast) Infantry Brigade (left 11 October 1941)
  - 1st Battalion, Gold Coast Regiment
  - 2nd Battalion, Gold Coast Regiment
  - 3rd Battalion, Gold Coast Regiment
- 25th (East Africa) Infantry Brigade (from 7 April to 13 July 1941: from 19 September 1941 to 12 March 1942)
  - 2/3rd Battalion, King's African Rifles
  - 2/4th Battalion, King's African Rifles
  - 3/4th Battalion, King's African Rifles (from 18 June)
  - 6th (Uganda) Field Ambulance
- 26th (East Africa) Infantry Brigade (from 20 October 1941 to 18 December 1942)
  - 2/2nd Battalion, King's African Rifles
  - 4/4th Battalion, King's African Rifles
  - 3/6th Battalion, King's African Rifles
- 28th (East Africa) Infantry Brigade (from 8 March 1942)
  - 4/6th Battalion, King's African Rifles
  - 2/1st Battalion, King's African Rifles
  - 7th Battalion, King's African Rifles
  - 28th (East Africa) Infantry Brigade Group Company East African Army Service Corps (from 1 January 1942)
  - 8th (East Africa) Field Ambulance (from 18 March 1943)
- 29th (East Africa) Infantry Brigade (from 21 January 1943)
  - 2/4th Battalion, King's African Rifles
  - 5/6th Battalion, King's African Rifles
  - 5th Battalion Northern Rhodesia Regiment
  - 29th (East Africa) Infantry Brigade Group Company East African Army Service Corps
- Artillery
  - 51st (Gold Coast) Light Battery, West African Artillery (left 6 December 1941)
  - 53rd (East Africa )Light Battery, East African Artillery (from 7 April to 13 July 1941; from 13 August to 7 December 1941)
  - 22nd Indian Mountain Battery (from 27 July to 5 December 1941)
  - 18th Indian Mountain Battery (from 27 July to 11 August 1941; from 9 October to 5 December 1941)
- Engineers
  - 52nd (Gold Coast) Field Company, West African Engineers (left 11 October 1941)
  - 54th (East Africa) Field Company, East African Engineers (from 27 July 1941)
  - 53rd (Gold Coast) Field Company, West African Engineers (from 7 April to 6 December 1941)
- Division troops
  - 12th (African) Division Signals (left 21 February 1943)

== Commanding officers ==
- Major-General Reade Godwin-Austen 1940–1941
- Major-General Charles Christopher Fowkes 1941–1943

== See also ==
- East African campaign (World War II)
- 1st (African) Division
- East African campaign (World War II) order of battle
- Nigel Leakey
