= 116th Infantry Brigade Royal Marines =

- Active: January to June 1945
- Country: United Kingdom
- Branch: Royal Navy
- Type: Infantry brigade
- Engagements: Second World War

Insignia
- Identification symbol: Neptune's trident, in yellow, upright on an inverted scarlet isosceles triangle with domed base.

The 116th Infantry Brigade Royal Marines was an infantry brigade formation of the Royal Marines created in the final stages of the Second World War.

== Unit history ==
The unit was one of two created to address the manpower shortage of 21st Army Group in early 1945. The brigade was created on 1 January 1945 from former members of the Royal Marines Division, which had been broken up in 1943 and the troops distributed to Marine Commandos, or retrained as landing craft crew. They were quickly re-mustered as regular infantry, organised as a standard Army brigade.

The 116th Brigade was sent into action in February 1945, serving under the First Canadian Army in the crossing of the Maas, and in the advance across the Rhine into north-west Germany to the naval ports, with the 28th Battalion particularly distinguishing itself in the fighting around Oldenburg, and 27th Battalion fighting with the 4th Canadian Armoured Division in their advance through Oldenburg towards Wilhelmshaven.

The brigade remained in northern Germany after the surrender as part of XXX Corps, with their headquarters at Buxtehude, but operating in the naval ports of Wilhelmshaven, Emden, Brunsbüttel, and Cuxhaven, overseeing the capitulation of German naval ships and personnel, until returning to the UK at the end of June 1945 to be disbanded.

== See also ==
- British brigades of the Second World War
