= 1st (West Africa) Infantry Brigade =

3rd (Nigeria) Infantry Brigade 23rd (Nigeria) Infantry Brigade 1st (West Africa) Infantry Brigade
- Active: 1940–1945
- Allegiance: British Crown
- Branch: British Empire
- Type: Infantry
- Size: Brigade
- Part of: 1st (African) Division; 11th (African) Division; 82nd (West Africa) Division
- Engagements: East African campaign Burma campaign

Commanders
- Notable commanders: Brigadier Gerald Smallwood

The 1st (West Africa) Infantry Brigade was an infantry brigade of the British Colonial Auxiliary Forces during World War II. It was formed in 1940 from battalions of the Royal West African Frontier Force and served in the East African and Burma campaigns.

== History ==
The 1st (West Africa) Infantry Brigade was originally raised in 1940 as the 3rd (Nigerian) Brigade. In this guise it was involved in the East African Campaign against the forces of the Italian Empire in Kenya under the command of Brigadier Gerald Smallwood. Later it was renamed the 23rd (Nigerian) Brigade and was attached to the 1st (African) Division. In February 1941, the 23rd (Nigerian) Brigade took Mogadishu the capital of Italian Somaliland. On 10 March 1941, the Brigade quickly advanced to Degehabur, about 160 km (100 mi) south of Jijiga, and captured the city days later without resistance, before it participated in the reoccupation of British Somaliland later in the year.

In 1944 the brigade was attached to the 82nd (West Africa) Division and renamed the 1st (West Africa) Infantry Brigade. In this same year it sailed for Ceylon, where the division was assembled on 20 July. The brigade then moved to Burma and took part in the third Arakan campaign in December 1944.

The brigade first advanced south along the Kalapanzin valley, then crossed a steep and jungle-covered mountain range to converge with the 81st (West Africa) Division on Myohaung at the mouth of the Kaladan River. This move forced the Japanese to evacuate the Mayu peninsula which they had held for almost four years and retreat south along the coast. They continued to advance, maintaining pressure on the Japanese, capturing the port of Gwa shortly before the Japanese abandoned Burma.

=== Formations ===
The 1st (West Africa) Infantry Brigade was made up of the following units

- 1st Bn., The Nigeria Regiment
- 2nd Bn., The Nigeria Regiment
- 3rd Bn., The Nigeria Regiment
- 52nd (Nigeria) Light Battery West African Artillery
- 51st (Nigeria) Field Company, West African Engineers
