= 28th Infantry Brigade (United Kingdom) =

28th Brigade 28th Infantry Brigade 28th Commonwealth Brigade 28th Commonwealth Infantry Brigade Group 28th ANZUK Infantry Brigade 28 (UK) Infantry Brigade
- Active: 1914–1976
- Country: United Kingdom
- Branch: British Army
- Type: Infantry
- Size: Brigade

The 28th Infantry Brigade was a British Army formation which served during the First World War, the Second World War, The Malayan Emergency and Indonesian Confrontation.

== History ==
=== 28th Brigade ===
==== First World War ====
The 28th Brigade was part of 9th (Scottish) Division during the early stages of the First World War, from civilians volunteering for Lord Kitchener's New Armies. It was initially composed of the 6th (Service) Battalion, King's Own Scottish Borderers, 9th (Service) Battalion, Cameronians (Scottish Rifles), and the 10th and 11th (Service) battalions of the Highland Light Infantry. The brigade trained, with the rest of the division, from August 1914 until May 1915 and arrived on the Western Front and were to remain there until being disbanded in May 1916, being replaced in the division by 1st South African Brigade.

The brigade was, however, briefly reformed in September 1918, during the Hundred Days Offensive in the final stages of the war. The 28th Brigade was composed as follows during the war:

- 6th (Service) Battalion, King's Own Scottish Borderers (left 6 May 1916)
- 9th (Service) Battalion, Cameronians (Scottish Rifles)
- 10th (Service) Battalion, Highland Light Infantry
- 11th (Service) Battalion, Highland Light Infantry
- 28th Machine Gun Company, Machine Gun Corps (formed 3 January 1916)

Upon being reformed in September 1918:

- 2nd Battalion, Royal Scots Fusiliers
- 1st Battalion, Royal Newfoundland Regiment
- 9th (Service) Battalion, Cameronians (Scottish Rifles)
- 28th Trench Mortar Battery

==== Second World War ====
Reformed in the Territorial Army in September 1939, the brigade was a 2nd Line Territorial Army formation and a duplicate of the 154 Infantry Brigade. Initially the 28th Brigade belonged to the 9th (Highland) Infantry Division from its creation in 1939 until August 1940. After the destruction of the 51st (Highland) Infantry Division during the Battle of France in May–June 1940, the 9th Division was redesignated the 51st (Highland) Division and the 28th Brigade HQ was absorbed by the HQ 154th Infantry Brigade.

The 28th Brigade came into being again when the 2nd Gibraltar Brigade was redesignated as the 28th Brigade at Gibraltar on 1 December 1943. The brigade was initially composed entirely of Regular Army battalions, the 2nd King's and 2nd Somersets had been in Gibraltar many years before the war. It served with the 4th Infantry Division in the Italian Campaign and later were involved in the Civil War in Greece, remaining there for the rest of the war.

The 28th Infantry Brigade was constituted as follows during the war:

- 7th Battalion, Black Watch (Royal Highland Regiment)
- 10th Battalion, Argyll and Sutherland Highlanders
- 11th Battalion, Argyll and Sutherland Highlanders

From December 1943 the 28th Infantry Brigade was constituted as follows:

- 2nd Battalion, King's Regiment (Liverpool)
- 2nd Battalion, Somerset Light Infantry
- 1st Battalion, Argyll and Sutherland Highlanders (from 5 December 1944)
- 2/4th Battalion, Hampshire Regiment (from 24 March 1944)

==== Post War ====
Mid 1949 Order of Battle

- 1st Battalion, King's Own Scottish Borderers
- 1st Battalion, South Staffordshire Regiment
- 1st Battalion, King's Shropshire Light Infantry

=== 28 Commonwealth Brigade ===
The Brigade arrived in Hong Kong from the United Kingdom in 1949, to join the 40th Infantry Division. It arrived in April 1951 in Korea, took the title '28th Commonwealth Brigade' and joined the 1st Commonwealth Division, and served right through the Korean War, until leaving in 1954. It comprised two British and two Australian infantry battalions and 16th Field Regiment, Royal New Zealand Artillery.

=== 28th Commonwealth Infantry Brigade Group ===
The Brigade was reformed on 16 September 1955 in Malaya, formed from a combination of forces from Australia, New Zealand and Britain. The formation was now air-portable and named the 28th Commonwealth Infantry Brigade Group. Its main elements were three infantry battalions from Australia, Britain and New Zealand and a British field artillery regiment with an Australian battery. The Brigade's operational role was as the 'Immediate Reaction Force' for the South East Asia Treaty Organisation.

Originally stationed at Taiping, it was then stationed in a new purpose built camp at Terandak, near Malacca in Malaysia. On 31 October 1971 the Brigade ceased to exist. However, its demise was painless and involved a mere change of name and location.

=== 28 ANZUK Infantry Brigade ===
On 1 November 1971 the Brigade became '28 ANZUK Infantry Brigade' and was located on the northern side of Singapore Island. The brigade consisted of the Royal Highland Fusiliers, 6 Royal Australian Regiment and 1 RNZIR together with supporting Artillery, Signals, Engineer and Logistic units. HQ ANZUK Force HQ was located in the old RN Naval based at what was HMS Terror. After a short period as 28 (UK) Infantry Brigade was disbanded in 1974.

=== 28 (UK) Infantry Brigade ===
After the demise of ANZUK Force in 1974, the remaining British units in Singapore regrouped as 28 (UK) Infantry Brigade, and with the withdrawal of the final British forces from Singapore, was finally disbanded in 1976.
