= 232nd Infantry Brigade =

Military unit

The 232nd Infantry Brigade was a formation of the British Army during both the First and the Second World Wars.

== First World War ==
It was assigned to the 75th Division and served in the Sinai and Palestine Campaign. Units included:

- 1/5th (Prince of Wales's) Battalion, Devonshire Regiment
- 2/5th Battalion, Hampshire Regiment
- 1/4th Battalion, Duke of Cornwall's Light Infantry
- 2nd Battalion, Loyal North Lancashire Regiment
- 2nd Battalion, 3rd Gurkha Rifles
- 2/4th Battalion, Somerset Light Infantry
- 1/4th Battalion, Duke of Edinburgh's (Wiltshire Regiment)
- 72nd Punjabis
- 2/4th Battalion, Dorsetshire Regiment
- 3rd Battalion, Kashmir Rifles
- 229th Machine Gun Company
- 232nd Trench Mortar Battery

== Second World War ==
The 232nd Infantry Brigade was formed from the 2nd (Malta) Infantry Brigade. It was based in Malta and Egypt.

Commander was Brigadier F.A.J.E. Marshall.

== Component Units ==
- 2nd Battalion, King's Own Malta Regiment
- 3rd Battalion, King's Own Malta Regiment
- 2nd Battalion, Royal Irish Fusiliers
- 8th Battalion, King's Own Royal Regiment (Lancaster)
- 8th Battalion, Manchester Regiment
