= 302nd Infantry Brigade =

The 302nd Infantry Brigade was a headquarters formed by the British Army towards the end of the Second World War.

By the end of 1944, 21st Army Group was suffering a severe manpower shortage, particularly among the infantry. In January 1945, the War Office began to reorganise surplus anti-aircraft and coastal artillery regiments in the UK into infantry battalions, primarily for line of communication and occupation duties in North West Europe, thereby releasing trained infantry for frontline service. The 302nd brigade was formed on 15 January 1945 as one of a proposed eight brigade headquarters organised to command these new units. However, no brigade commander was appointed and no units were posted to the brigade, which was disbanded on 7 March 1945.

== External sources ==
- The Royal Artillery 1939–45
