= Northern Rhodesia Regiment =

British colonial regiment

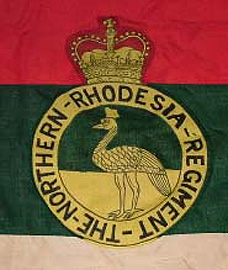
- Active: 1933–1964
- Disbanded: 1964
- Countries: (Northern Rhodesia) Northern Rhodesia; British Empire
- Branch: British Colonial Auxiliary Forces
- Type: infantry
- Role: Colonial infantry
- Mottos: "Different in Race, Equal in Fidelity"
- Colours: Red, white and green
- Engagements: Second World War

The Northern Rhodesia Regiment (NRR) was a British Colonial Auxiliary Forces regiment raised from the protectorate of Northern Rhodesia. It was formed in 1933 from elements of the Northern Rhodesia Police, which had been formed during Company rule in 1912. Made up of black other ranks and white officers, its motto was "Different in Race, Equal in Fidelity". This motto may have been adopted following native African porters during the First World War being recognised and compensated as couriers by the British.

The NRR fought in the Second World War in Somaliland, Madagascar, the Middle East, Ceylon and Burma. The 1st Battalion fought in the Kabaw Valley offensive in 1944, as part of the 11th East African Division, in late 1944. This was their last campaign and they returned to Africa in January 1946.

The 1st Battalion served with distinction in the Malayan Emergency from 1953 to 1955. Between 1953 and 1963, during federation with Southern Rhodesia and Nyasaland, it made up part of the Federal armed forces. On Northern Rhodesia's independence as Zambia in 1964, the NRR was renamed the Zambia Regiment and integrated into the new Zambian Defence Force.

== History ==
The Northern Rhodesia Regiment (NRR) was founded in 1933 when the military arm of the Northern Rhodesia Police were split off as an independent body. Unlike most black majority regiments for an unknown reason, it was kept independent from the King's African Rifles (KAR) similar to Southern Rhodesia's Rhodesian African Rifles. Though it was still run in a similar fashion to the King's African Rifles with officers being seconded from the British Army until 1938 when two reserve units for African and European soldiers were set up in preparation for local officers to eventually take over. Compared with many other colonial regiments in the British Empire, the black soldiers received more technical training. In 1935, the Northern Rhodesia Regiment were called up to support the Northern Rhodesia Police during the Copperbelt strike of 1935 along with members of the British South Africa Police from Southern Rhodesia. During the strike, the Northern Rhodesia Police lost control in the face of stones being thrown by black strikers and fired at them killing six which led to the strikers surrendering. However a report into the incident found no wrongdoing on the part of the NRR.

During the Second World War, though blacks were exempt from conscription as they were "British protected persons" in Northern Rhodesia, thousands of black Northern Rhodesians signed up as volunteers. The Regiment were then incorporated as a part of the 27th (N Rhodesia) Infantry Brigade but never fought as one unit during the war due to the risk of high casualties in the small regiment. In 1953, when Northern Rhodesia joined Southern Rhodesia and Nyasaland in the Federation of Rhodesia and Nyasaland, the Northern Rhodesia Regiment were amalgamated with the other constituent forces into the King's African Rifles. In 1963 following the breakup of the Federation, the Rhodesian Special Air Service (SAS) which was based in Northern Rhodesia, split and the regiment was given over to Southern Rhodesia. The soldiers were offered the chance to take a golden handshake, move to Southern Rhodesia or remain and join the Northern Rhodesia Regiment. In 1964, Northern Rhodesia gained independence as Zambia and the regiment was renamed the Zambia Regiment as a result.

== Uniform ==
The NRR's cap badge was based upon the badge of the Northern Rhodesian Police. The regiment retained the colours of red and white they inherited from the Northern Rhodesia Police but also added a green stripe to commemorate the predecessor North-Eastern Rhodesia Constabulary. Officers wore Wolseley helmets whilst the ranks wore field service caps, both of which had the regimental colours on as a tactical recognition flash. The regiment adopted a hackle of green and red ostrich feathers in 1941 though it is not recorded how they were worn.

== Battalions ==
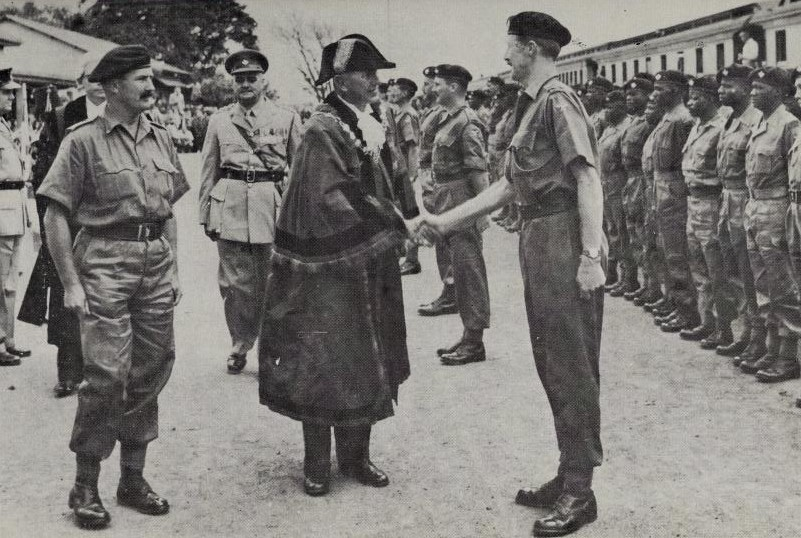
Troops of the 1st Battalion, 1956

The NRR were eventually separated into nine battalions. The 1st Battalion was raised in 1939 and were sent to guard the Northern Rhodesian border with the Belgian Congo following a false report there was an invasion force preparing to pass through Portuguese Angola. They then moved to fight against the Italian conquest of British Somaliland and then onto Ceylon and Burma via Aden. The 2nd Battalion was established in 1940 and shot 40 rioters during the 1940 Copperbelt strike. As a result, they were split and served out the rest of the war carrying out internal security and garrison duties. The 3rd, 4th and 5th Battalions were also raised for garrison duties. The 6th were sent to fight in Italian Somaliland in the East Africa campaign, the 7th served in French Madagascar and the 8th served in Somaliland and the Ethiopian Empire. There was also an Independent Company set up to protect the headquarters of the East Africa Command.

== Notable personnel ==
- William Alfred Dimoline, later a British Army general, served as Commandant of the NRR pre-Second World War
- Roger Hawkins, Rhodesian politician, served in the NRR during the Second World War
- Kennedy Trevaskis, later High Commissioner of Aden, served in the NRR during the Second World War
- Peter Walls, later head of the Armed Forces of Rhodesia, began his Rhodesian military career with the NRR post-Second World War
- Eric Charles Twelves Wilson, winner of the Victoria Cross, was seconded to the NRR in 1946
- Edward Makuka Nkoloso, served in the NRR during the Second World War, later he became a member of the Zambian resistance movement and was the founder of the Zambia National Academy of Science, Space Research and Philosophy.

== See also ==
- Bibliography of the history of Zambia § Colonial Rhodesia era
