= Brigade group =

Military unit size designation

A brigade group is a term used primarily in armies of the Commonwealth of Nations for an ad hoc arrangement of forces. It can be a temporary or permanent organisation.

It generally refers to a formation which includes three or four battlegroups, or an infantry brigade (three battalions), supported by armoured, artillery, field engineer, aviation and support units, and amounting to about 5,000 soldiers. A brigade group represents the smallest unit able to operate independently for extended periods on the battlefield. It is similar to the concept of a regimental combat team (RCT), which was once used by the United States Army, but which now uses the term brigade combat team (BCT). The United States Marine Corps continues to use the term regimental combat team.

== See also ==
- Combat team
