= Tactical recognition flash =

Patch to identify British military regiment or corps

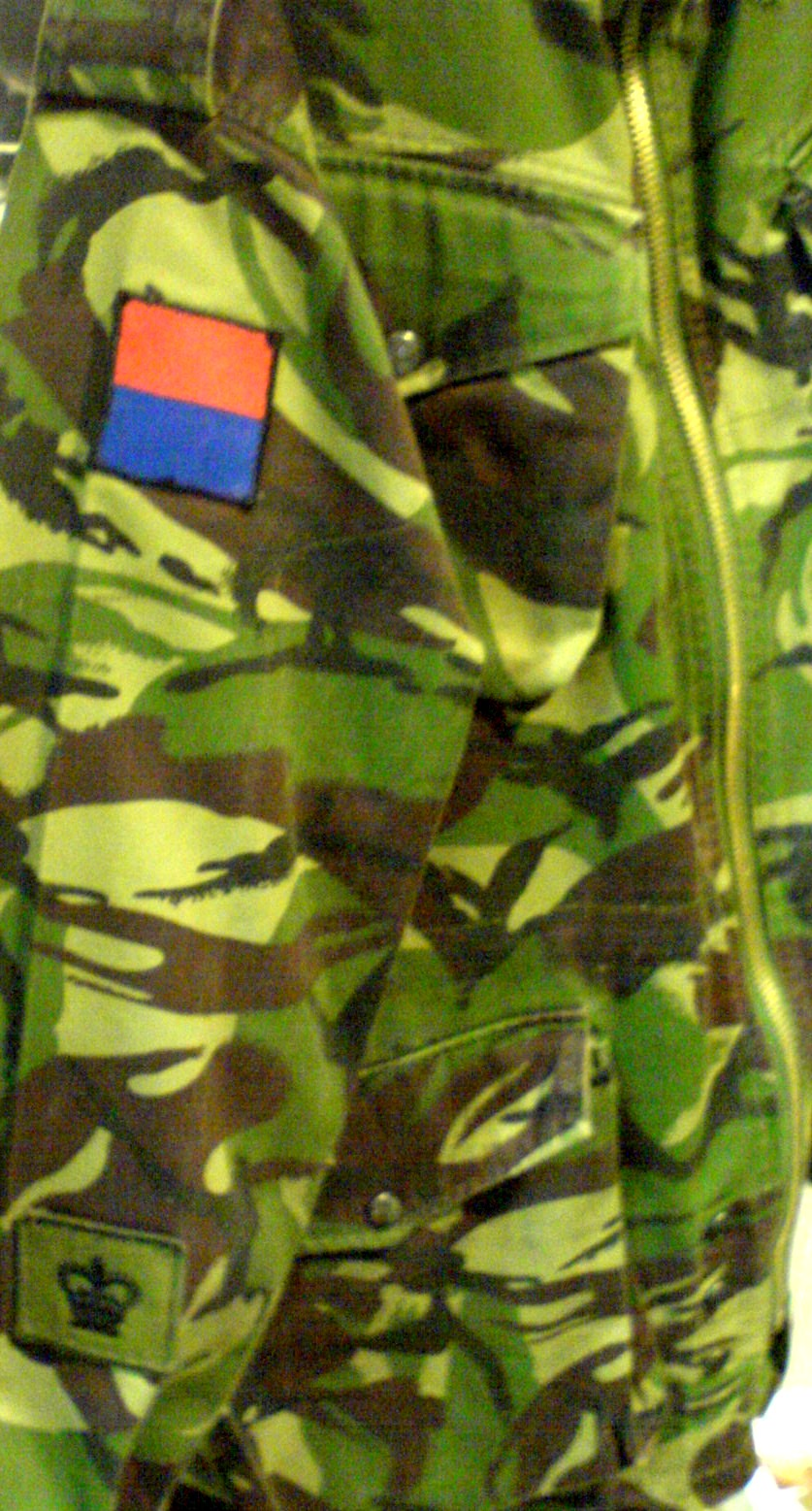
Red and blue tactical recognition flash of the Royal Artillery.

A tactical recognition flash (TRF) is a coloured patch worn on the right arm of combat clothing by members of the British Army, Royal Navy, and Royal Air Force. A TRF serves to quickly identify the regiment or corps of the wearer, in the absence of a cap badge. It is similar to, but distinct from, the DZ Flashes worn by members of Airborne Forces.

TRFs should not be confused with formation signs or insignia, which are used to denote the formation (usually brigade or division or a higher headquarters), and are worn in addition to TRFs by a member of any regiment or corps serving in that formation.

== Royal Navy ==
Royal Navy

== British Army ==
Royal Armoured Corps	Army Air Corps	Royal Regiment of Artillery	Royal Corps of Signals	Corps of Royal Engineers
see individual regiments				
Corps of Royal Electrical & Mechanical Engineers	Royal Logistic Corps	Intelligence Corps	Royal Army Chaplains' Department	Infantry
				see individual regiments
Adjutant General's Corps	Royal Army Medical Service	Royal Army Veterinary Corps		
see branches				
Special Air Service	Royal Corps of Army Music	Royal Army Physical Training Corps	Small Arms School Corps	
none	no data			
Honourable Artillery Company				
(Corps of Drums only, Special OP Sqns none)				

=== Royal Armoured Corps ===
Regular Regiments
Household Cavalry Regiment	1st The Queen's Dragoon Guards	Royal Scots Dragoon Guards	Royal Dragoon Guards	Queen's Royal Hussars
Royal Lancers	King's Royal Hussars	Light Dragoons	Royal Tank Regiment	
Yeomanry Regiments
Royal Yeomanry	Royal Wessex Yeomanry	Scottish and North Irish Yeomanry	Queen's Own Yeomanry	
		SNIY TRF		

=== Army Air Corps ===
1st Regiment, Army Air Corps	2nd Regiment, Army Air Corps	3rd Regiment, Army Air Corps	4th Regiment, Army Air Corps	5th Regiment, Army Air Corps
No data	No data			No data
6th Regiment, Army Air Corps	7th Regiment, Army Air Corps	9th Regiment, Army Air Corps		
No data				

=== Infantry ===
Infantry Regiments
Foot Guards	Royal Regiment of Scotland	Princess of Wales's Royal Regiment	Duke of Lancaster's Regiment (2014–Present)	Royal Regiment of Fusiliers
				RRF TRF Worn on helmet, for shoulder TRFs see individual battalions
Royal Anglian Regiment	Royal Yorkshire Regiment	Mercian Regiment	Royal Welsh	Royal Irish Regiment
None; See individual battalions				
Parachute Regiment	Royal Gurkha Rifles	The Rifles		
See drop zone flash				

Infantry Battalions and Sub-units
1st Battalion, Royal Regiment of Fusiliers	5th Battalion, Royal Regiment of Fusiliers	
1st Battalion, Royal Anglian Regiment	2nd Battalion, Royal Anglian Regiment	3rd Battalion, Royal Anglian Regiment

=== Adjutant General's Corps ===
Royal Military Police	Military Provost Staff	Military Provost Guard Service	Army Legal Services	Staff and Personnel Support	Educational and Training Services

=== Overseas forces ===
British Forces Brunei Brigade of Gurkhas	Royal Gibraltar Regiment	Cayman Islands Regiment	Turks and Caicos Islands Regiment

=== Historic ===
Historic
Royal Scots	Royal Highland Fusiliers	King's Own Scottish Borderers	Highlanders (Seaforth, Gordons and Camerons)	Argyll and Sutherland Highlanders
	Royal Highland Fusiliers TRF	King's Own Scottish Borderers tactical recognition flash	Highlanders TRF	
2nd Battalion, Royal Regiment of Fusiliers	King's Own Royal Border Regiment	King's Regiment	Queen's Lancashire Regiment	Lancastrian and Cumbrian Volunteers
			Queen's Lancashire Regiment tactical recognition flash	
Duke of Lancaster's Regiment (2006–14)	Prince of Wales's Own Regiment of Yorkshire	Green Howards	Duke of Wellington's Regiment	Tyne-Tees Regiment
LANCS TRF				
East and West Riding Regiment	1st Battalion, Mercian Regiment	2nd Battalion, Mercian Regiment	3rd Battalion, Mercian Regiment	Cheshire Regiment
East and West Riding Regiment tactical recognition flash				Cheshire Regiment tactical recognition flash
Worcestershire and Sherwood Foresters Regiment	Staffordshire Regiment	West Midlands Regiment	Royal Welch Fusiliers	Royal Regiment of Wales
Worcestershire and Sherwood Foresters Regiment (29th/45th Foot) tactical recognition flash	Staffordshire Regiment tactical recognition flash	West Midlands TRF		
1st Battalion, Royal Welsh	2nd Battalion, Royal Welsh	3rd Battalion, Royal Welsh	Devonshire and Dorset Regiment	Royal Gloucestershire, Berkshire and Wiltshire Regiment
			D&D TRF	
The Light Infantry	Royal Green Jackets	Royal Rifle Volunteers7th Battalion, The Rifles	Royal Mercian and Lancastrian Yeomanry	Royal Hong Kong Regiment
Light Infantry tactical recognition flash	Royal Green Jackets tactical recognition flash	Royal Rifle Volunteers tactical recognition flash		
Queen Alexandra's Royal Army Nursing Corps	Royal Army Dental Corps	Royal Army Medical Corps		

== Royal Air Force ==
Royal Air Force	Royal Air Force Police

== Cadet forces ==
Tactical recognition flashes are not to be worn by civilian Cadet Force Adult Volunteers (CFAVs), nor uniformed cadets of the Army Cadet Force (ACF) and army section of the Combined Cadet Force (CCF), irrespective of any affiliation to a Corps or Regiment. Army Cadet Force and Combined Cadet Force cadets and CFAVs do wear county and contingent flashes respectively.

All members of the RAF Air Cadets (Air Training Corps; ATC), staff and cadet, wear the RAFAC Cadet formation flash.

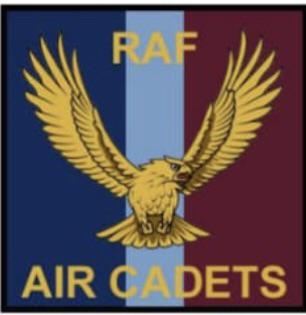
The Air Training Corps' tactical recognition flash, worn by all air cadet staff and cadets, introduced in 2023.

== See also ==
- Unit Colour Patch — Australian equivalent
- Shoulder sleeve insignia — American similar equivalent
- Drop zone flash
