= Formation patch =

A formation patch or formation badge is a military insignia that identifies a soldier's military formations.

== History ==
Previous to the 20th Century, tactical control of military units in the field - particularly in the "post-Cromwell era" - was aided by the use of distinctively coloured uniforms and colours, standards and guidons.

=== World War I ===
The unit colour patch worn by the 1st Battalion, 1st Brigade, 1st Division, AIF.

During World War I, as armies adopted drab coloured uniforms, the need to identify friendly troops in assaulting formations was made acute by the problems of intensive defensive firepower and the attendant problem of dispersion. The British Army, among others, developed a solution whereby individual divisions, brigades, battalions and even companies were identified by distinctive coloured cloth insignia, either sewn to the uniform jacket (on the sleeves, or the back of the tunic), or painted on the helmet. These marks became common after the Battle of the Somme in 1916. These distinguishing marks were also alternately known as "Battle Patches". Other armies continued to identify regiments through the use of numerals, but did not identify military divisions through the use of patches. The United States Army, however, did develop a system of shoulder sleeve insignia with distinctive badges identifying individual divisions.

=== World War II ===
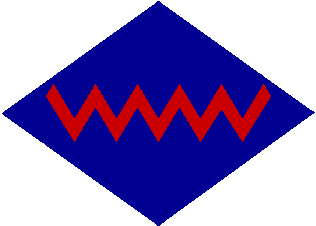
The formation patch worn by the 2nd Army Group Royal Canadian Artillery, a component of II Canadian Corps.

The formation patch worn by the 50th (Northumbrian) Infantry Division during World War II.

By the time of the Second World War, the various armies did not feel a perceived need to identify individual battalions on battledress uniforms. The German Army had a system of coloured bayonet knots that identified the wearer's company, number shoulder strap buttons that identified the wearer's company/battalion, and shoulder straps that identified the wearer's regiment, but had no distinguishing divisional insignia other than the cuff titles of the 'elite' formations. The British Army prohibited all identifying marks on its Battle Dress uniforms in 1939 save for drab regimental slip-on titles, but in 1941 introduced formation patches to identify the wearer's division. They were initially referred to by the British as "Divisional Signs", but this was soon changed to "Formation Badges". By the end of the war, Corps, Armies, and Army Groups had their own insignia.

The Canadian Army followed suit. The 2nd Canadian Infantry Division used a "battle patch" system of geometric shapes identifying individual brigades and battalions, similar to that used by the 2nd Canadian Division in the First World War, during the 1941-42 period, but abandoned this system after the Dieppe Raid. Other Canadian divisions used plain formation patches, and separate unit titles.

The United States continued its system as shoulder sleeve insignia with a regulation that prior combat service entitled the wearer to sew the formation patch of a former unit on the right sleeve of a uniform or field jacket, and the patch of the currently assigned formation on the left sleeve.

=== Modern usage ===
Formation patches are in use in the 21st Century in many modern militaries, though when in use on combat uniforms are generally rendered in subdued colours.

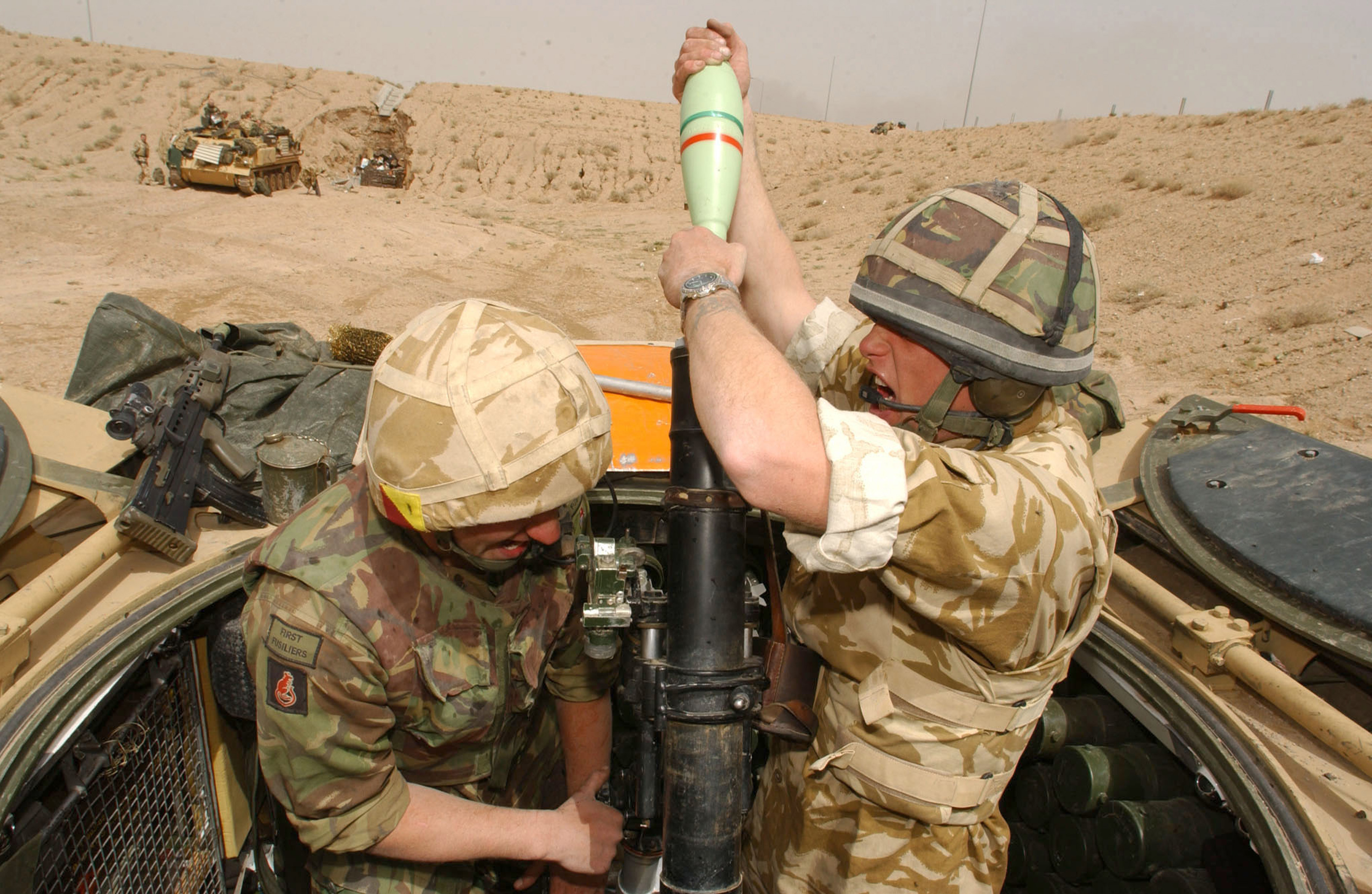
British infantry of the Royal Regiment of Fusiliers in action during the 2003 invasion of Iraq. The soldier on the left is wearing the famous "Desert Rat" insignia of the 7th Armoured Brigade.

See also Formation patches of the Canadian Army, Divisional insignia of the British Army, Brigade insignia of the British Army, and Unit Colour Patch for the Australian Army.
