= Brigade insignia of the British Army =

== World War I ==
During World War I the need to identify friendly troops in assaulting formations was made difficult by the new dispersion of troops across the battlefield. Beginning with the arrival of large number of Kitchener's Army troops in 1915, and widespread after the Battle of the Somme of 1916, each battalion of a division would have a particular sign of a distinctive coloured cloth patch, either sewn to the uniform jacket (on the sleeves, or the back of the tunic), or painted on the helmet. These distinguishing marks, known as "Battle Patches" were distinct from the Division signs, and were for the most part simple shapes and colours. The scheme for these Battle patches could be decided at division or brigade level or be based on regimental colours or insignia, and was in some cases continued down to company or even platoon level. This system did not prevent duplication across the divisions, a red square was worn by at least 14 battalions.
In most divisions the brigade could be deduced by the shape (for example 50th (Northumbrian)), colour (for example 55th (West Lancashire)) or design theme (for example 23rd) of the patch. Few divisions had a scheme of patches that had a specific brigade patch; those divisions which had such a scheme are shown below.

8th Division	23rd, 24th, and 25th Brigade patches. These patches were worn by brigade HQ staff only, others wore battalion specific patches.
20th (Light) Division	59th, 60th, and 61st Brigade patches. These patches were worn by all in the brigade on both sleeves with the infantry battalions wearing a number of bars under the sign to indicate seniority.
31st Division	92nd, 93rd and 94th Brigade patches. These patches were worn by all in the brigade on the back below the collar. Battalion signs were worn on the sleeves which could also be used to deduce the brigade.
32nd Division	14th, 96th and 97th Brigade patches. These patches were worn by all in the brigade on the sleeves, with the infantry battalions adding bars below it indicating seniority, the same in each brigade.
41st Division	122nd, 123rd and 124th Brigade signs. These were not worn in the uniform, but used on sign posts and vehicles. The infantry battalions used numbers (or letters) in the sign as further identification.
74th (Yeomanry) Division	229th, 230th, and 231st Brigade patches. These patches were worn on the right arm, battalion patches (when present) on the left.

More examples can be seen for the 38th (Welsh) divisions, the 146th, 147th and 148th brigades.

== World War II ==
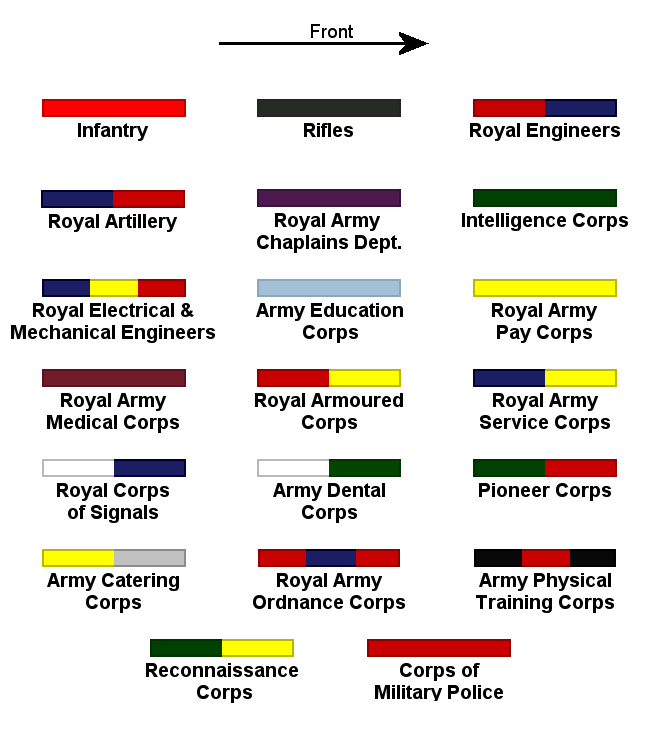
World War II British battledress arm of service (corps) colours

By the start of the Second World War, the British Army prohibited all identifying marks on its Battle Dress uniforms in 1939 save for drab (black or white on khaki) regimental or corps (branch) slip-on titles, and even these were not to be worn in the field. In May 1940 this was reinforced by Army Council Instruction (ACI) 419 prohibiting all formation marks on uniforms.

In September 1940 formation patches were authorized by ACI 1118 to identify the wearer's independent brigade or brigade group. A Brigade "Formation Badge" was sometimes worn when the formation was not attached to a division, as an Independent Infantry Brigade or brigade group (with attached other arms and services). When part of a division the infantry of a brigade wore one or more arm of service strips (2 inches (5.1 cm) by 1/4 inch (0.64 cm)), red for infantry, dark green for Rifle Regiments, indicating brigade seniority, one for the senior brigade, two for the intermediate and three for the junior. As an independent brigade or brigade group the infantry would only wear one strip, the other arms would also wear their arm of service strip. Battalion specific or general regimental patches, in addition to the shoulder title, could also be worn below the arm of service stripe, but the cost of these had to be borne from regimental funds, not the War Office.

In the British Army, ACI 1118 specified that the design for the formation sign should be approved by the general officer commanding the formation and reported to the War Office. A further order of December 1941 (ACI 2587) specified the material of the uniform patch as printed cotton (ordnance issue), this replaced the embroidered felt (or fulled wool) or metal badges used previously. In other theatres the uniform patch could be made from a variety of materials including printed or woven cotton, woven silk, leather or metal embroidered felt (or fulled wool).

=== Infantry ===
1st Independent Guards Brigade Group

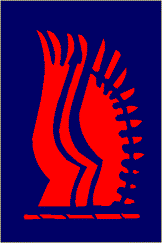
24th Infantry Brigade (Guards)

29th Infantry Brigade

31st Independent Infantry Brigade

32nd Infantry Brigade (Guards)

33rd Independent Infantry Brigade (Guards)

36th Independent Infantry Brigade

37th Independent Infantry Brigade

38th (Irish) Infantry Brigade

56th Independent Infantry Brigade

73rd Independent Infantry Brigade

115th Infantry Brigade

116th Infantry Brigade Royal Marines

117th Infantry Brigade Royal Marines

148th Independent Infantry Brigade

162nd Independent Infantry Brigade

204th Independent Infantry Brigade (Home)

206th Independent Infantry Brigade (United Kingdom)

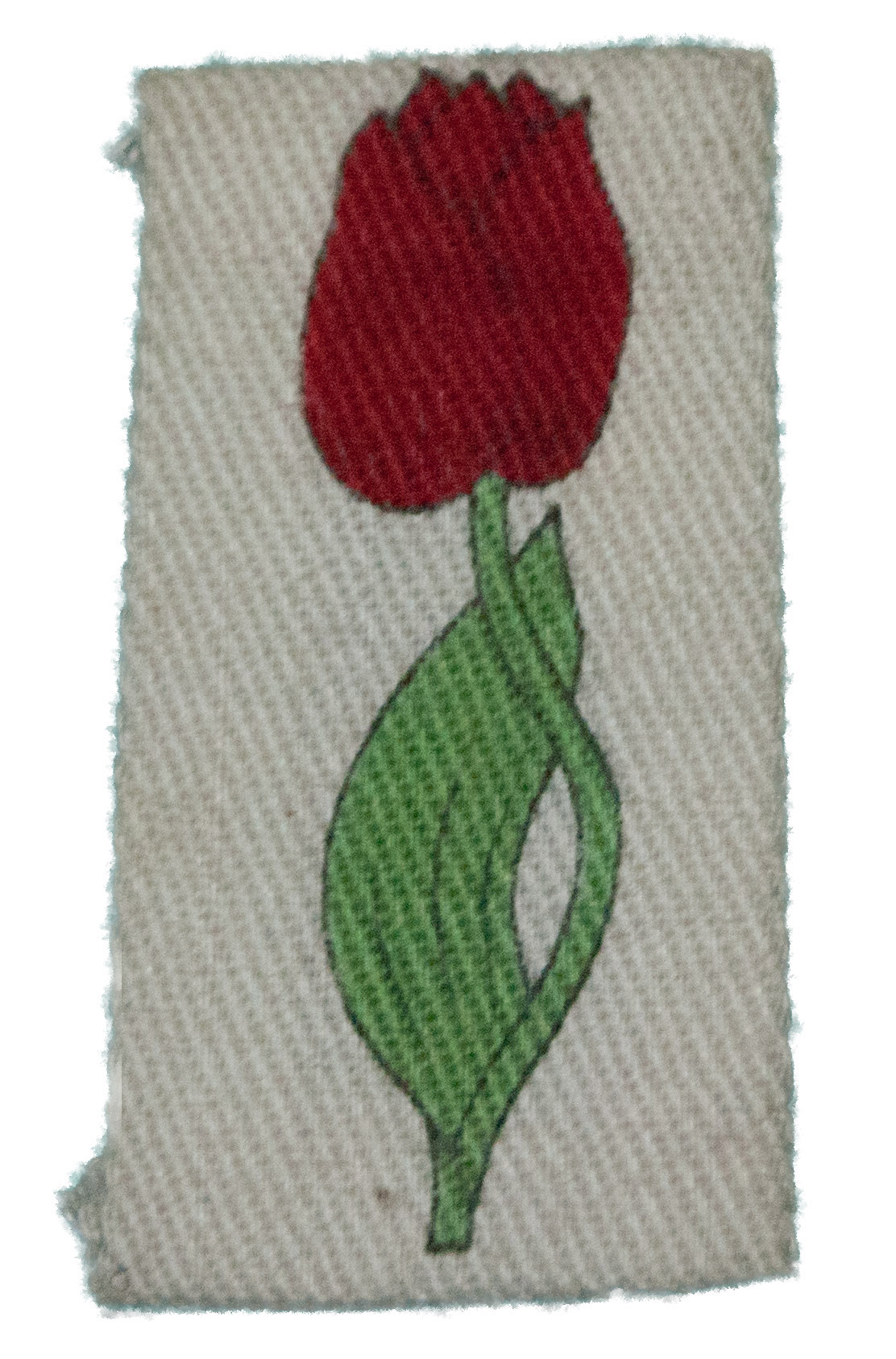
212th Independent Infantry Brigade

214th Independent Infantry Brigade

218th Independent Infantry Brigade

219th Independent Infantry Brigade

223rd Independent Infantry Brigade

231st Independent Infantry Brigade

301st Infantry Brigade

304th Infantry Brigade

Jewish Brigade

=== Armoured and Tank ===
2nd Armoured brigade

4th Armoured Brigade

6th Guards Tank Brigade

7th Armoured Brigade

8th Armoured Brigade

9th Armoured Brigade

20th Armoured Brigade

21st Army Tank Brigade

21st Army Tank brigade, second pattern from 1944.

22nd Armoured Brigade
1st pattern, white background

23rd Army Tank Brigade

23rd Armoured Brigade

24th Army Tank Brigade

25th Army Tank Brigade

27th Armoured Brigade

31st Army Tank Brigade

32nd Army Tank Brigade

33rd Tank Brigade

33rd Armoured Brigade

34th Armoured Brigade

35th Army Tank Brigade

36th Army Tank Brigade

== Post War ==
Aside from the deployment to Germany in the British Army of the Rhine, the employment of divisions has been rare since the Second World War, with Brigades often being the primary field formation.

=== Infantry ===
1st Guards Infantry Brigade

2nd Infantry Brigade

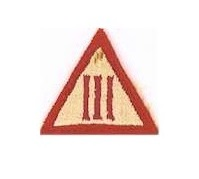
3rd Infantry Brigade

4th Guards Infantry Brigade

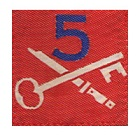
5th Infantry Brigade
also 5th Airborne Brigade

6th Infantry Brigade

12th Infantry Brigade

17th Infantry Brigade

23rd Brigade Group, in India 1946–1947.

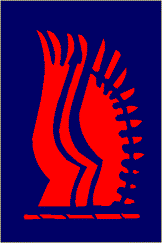
24th Infantry Brigade

27th Infantry Brigade

29th Infantry Brigade Group, in India 1945–1947.

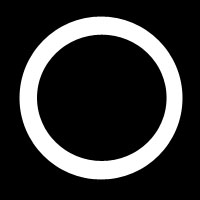
29th Infantry Brigade

31st Independent Infantry Brigade.

39th Independent Infantry Brigade

72nd Infantry Brigade Group, in India 1946–1947.

107th (Ulster) Independent Brigade Group
Territorial Army
Worn from 1950 to 1967.

161st Independent Infantry Brigade
Territorial Army

162nd Independent Infantry Brigade
Territorial Army

=== Armoured ===
9th Independent Armoured Brigade (T.A.)

23rd Independent Armoured Brigade (T.A.)

30th (Lowland) Independent Armoured Brigade (T.A.)

== Modern ==
Brigades consisting of supporting units maintain their own insignia as well. For use in the field the patches are also issued in subdued colours, green-black, sand shades or tan-black.

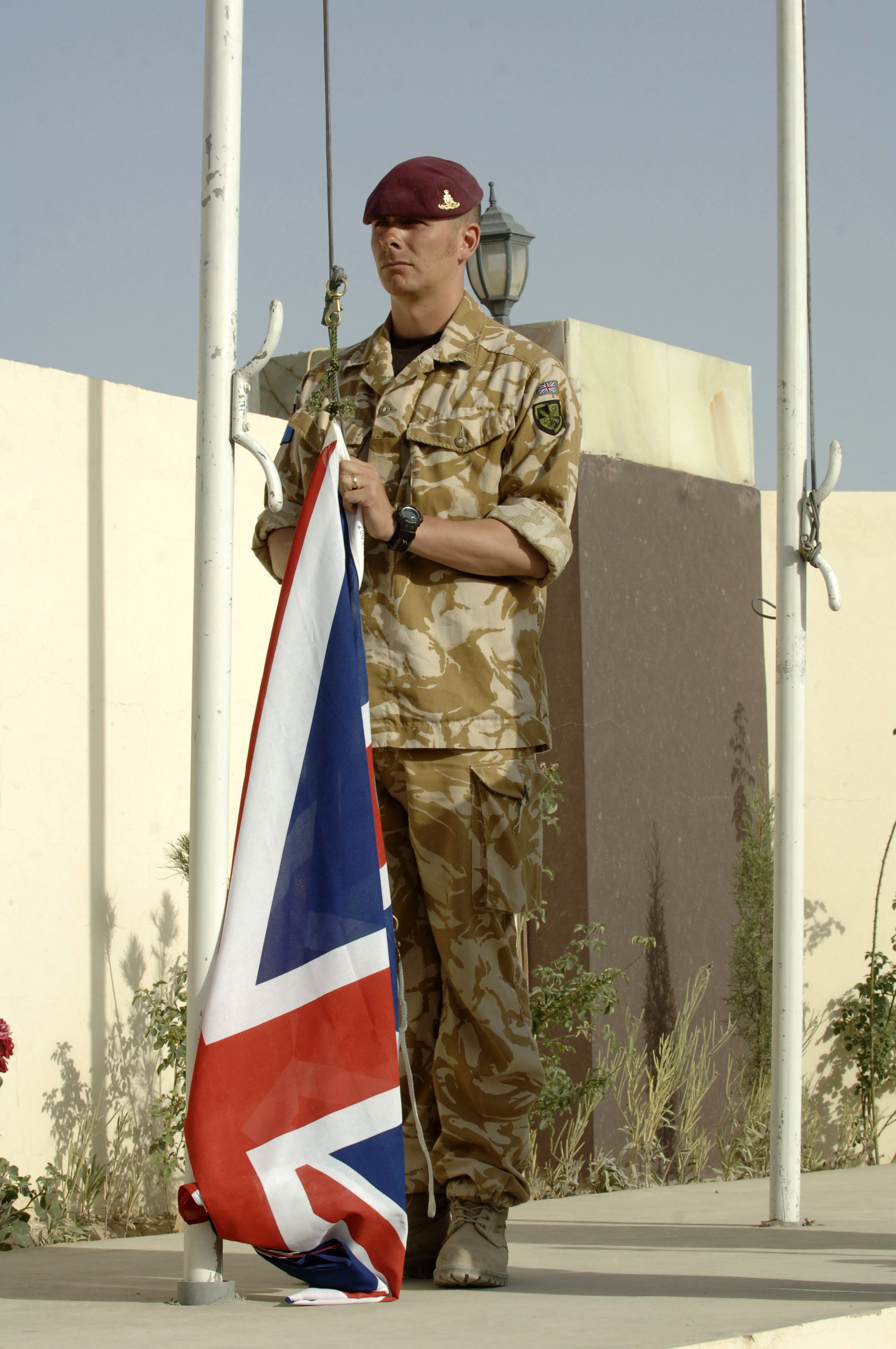
Soldier from the 16th Air Assault Brigade prepares to raise the Union Flag

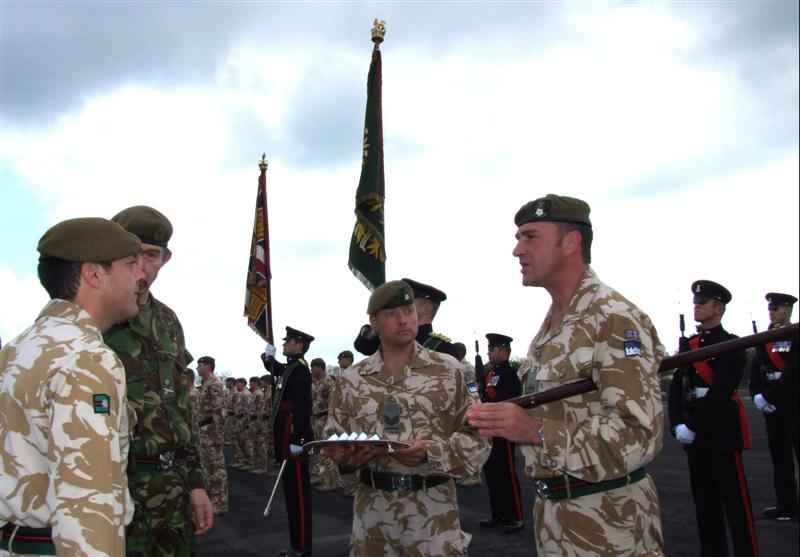
Afghanistan Service Medal Parade, note 52nd Infantry Brigade insignia

=== Armoured and Mechanised ===
1st Armoured Infantry Brigade

4th Mechanized Brigade

7th Armoured Brigade

12th Armoured Infantry Brigade

20th Armoured Infantry Brigade

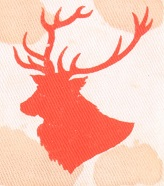
22nd Armoured Brigade

33rd Armoured Brigade

=== Infantry ===
15th Infantry Brigade

16 Air Assault Brigade
Obsolete

16 Air Assault Brigade

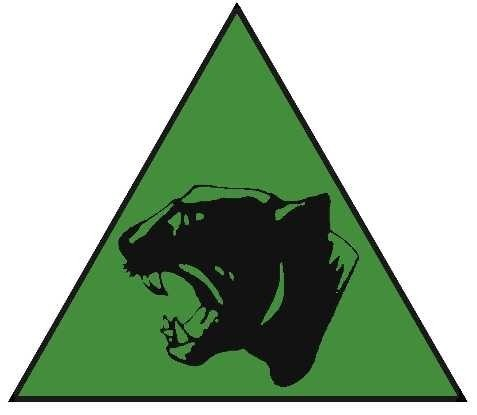
19th Light Brigade

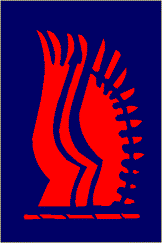
24th Infantry Brigade
also 24th Airportable Brigade

39th Infantry Brigade

42nd Infantry Brigade
42nd (North West) Brigade (used from 2003)

43rd (Wessex) Brigade (used from 1994)

49th Infantry Brigade
49th (East) Brigade (used from 1995)

51st Infantry Brigade

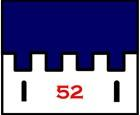
52nd Infantry Brigade

107th (Ulster) Brigade
Territorial Army.
Worn from 1988 to 2002.

160th Infantry Brigade and Headquarters Wales

=== Supporting Arms ===
1st Signal Brigade

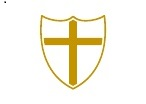
8th Engineer Brigade

11th Signal Brigade

101st Logistic Brigade

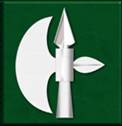
102nd Logistic Brigade

1st Intelligence, Surveillance and Reconnaissance Brigade

== Bibliography ==
- Boulanger, Bruno (2015). WW2 British Formation Badges, A Collectors Guide. ISBN 9782960180206.
- Chappell, Mike (1986). British Battle Insignia (1). 1914-18. Oxford: Osprey Publishing. ISBN 9780850457278.
- Cole, Howard (1973). Formation Badges of World War 2. Britain, Commonwealth and Empire. London: Arms and Armour Press.
- Cole (2), Howard, N (1953). Badges on Battledress, Post-War Formation Signs; Rank and Regimental Insignia. Aldershot: Gale and Polden.
- Davis, Brian L (1983). British Army Uniforms & Insignia of World War Two. London: Arms and Armour Press. ISBN 0853686092.
- Davis (2), Brian L (1985). British Army Cloth Insignia. 1940 to the present. An illustrated reference guide for collectors. London: Arms and Armour Press. ISBN 0853687099.
- Hibbard, Mike; Gibbs, Gary (2016). Infantry Divisions, Identification Schemes 1917 (1 ed.). Wokingham: The Military History Society.
- Hodges, Lt. Col Robin (2005). British Army Badges. Butler and Tanner Ltd. ISBN 9780955146305.
- Watson, Graham E; Rinaldi, Richard A (2005). The British in Germany (BAOR and After): An Organizatinal History. Tiger Lily Publications. ISBN 9780972029698.
