= 131 AD Regiment =

131 Air Defence Regiment
- Active: 1968 – present
- Country: India
- Allegiance: India
- Branch: Indian Army
- Type: Corps of Army Air Defence
- Size: Regiment
- Nickname(s): “The Only Ones”
- Motto(s): Sanskrit: आकाशे शत्रुन् जहि English: Defeat the Enemy in the Sky
- Colors: Sky Blue and Red
- Equipment: 40 mm L/70

Insignia
- Abbreviation: 131 AD Regt

131 Air Defence Regiment is an Air Defence regiment of the Indian Army.

== Formation ==
The regiment was raised on 24 September 1968 as a territorial army regiment at Siliguri, West Bengal.

== History ==
At the time of its formation, the Regiment was equipped with Bofors 40 mm L-60 anti-aircraft guns, it had inherited from 106 Heavy Anti Aircraft Territorial Army. On 15 September 1973, the regiment was converted into a regular air defence regiment. In due course, it was equipped with the 40 mm L/70 gun and the Super Fledermaus radar. It presently also has the Flycatcher (KL/MSS-6720) radar system and the Tactical Control Radar (TCR).

== Operations ==
The regiment has taken part in the following operations-

- Indo-Pakistani War of 1971: It provided air defence protection to 16 Field Ammunition Depot, Bagdogra Airfield, 33 Corps Signal Centre, Shahbad signal unit and other locations.
- Operation Trident: It provided cover to Ammunition Supply Depot and Mirthal bridge between January and May 1987.
- Operation Rakshak: Between June 1990 and March 1991 at Baroda and Jamnagar.
- Bombay riots: The regiment aided civil authority during the Mumbai riots (Operation Vyavastha) in December 1992.
- Operation Vijay: Various subunits provided air defence protection from May 1999. The unit was repositioned in the order of battle with 785 (Independent) Air Defence Brigade from July 1999 in the 2 Corps zone.
- Operation Parakram: Subunits provided air defence protection between December 2001 to December 2002 to Headquarters 10 Corps, Corps Logistics Node North, Corps Logistics Node South, Bhatinda railway station and Ammunition Depots.
- 2008 Mumbai attacks: One column of the unit was mobilised to cordon Hotel Taj at Mumbai, after the terrorists stuck and took people hostage.
- Indian Army operations in Jammu and Kashmir: Subunits of the regiment were deployed in counter insurgency operation in Jammu and Kashmir between August 1993 and December 1995 and again between August 2015 and July 2017.

== Honours and awards ==
- 131 AD Regiment was awarded the General Officer Commanding in Chief (Southern Command)’s Unit Citation in 2015
- The Regiment has been awarded the Director General Army Air Defence’s (DGAAD) unit appreciation award three times (2005, 2008 and 2013).
- In addition, it has won 5 Sena Medals, 1 mentioned in dispatches, 5 COAS Commendation Cards, 2 C-in-C Strategic Forces Commendation Cards, 1 Chief of Air Staff Commendation Card and 48 GOC-in-C Commendation Cards.

== Notable Officers ==
- Lieutenant General PK Pahwa, PVSM – 5th Commanding Officer and 1st Director General, Corps of Army Air Defence
- Lieutenant General Ashwini Kumar, PVSM, AVSM, VSM, ADC – Adjutant-General
