= General Leslie (disambiguation) =

David Leslie, 1st Lord Newark (c. 1600–1682) was a Scottish Royalists general, General Leslie may refer to:

- Alexander Leslie (British Army officer) (1731–1794), British Army major general
- Alexander Leslie, 1st Earl of Leven (1580–1661), Scottish Lord General in command of the Army of the Covenanters
- Andrew Leslie (general) (born 1957), Canadian Forces lieutenant general
- John Leslie, 10th Earl of Rothes (1698–1767), British Army general
- Walter Leslie (field marshal) (1607–1667), Scottish-born Holy Roman Empire general
- Walter Leslie (Indian Army officer) (1876–1947), British Indian Army general
