= Herbert Watts =

British Army officer during the First World War

Lieutenant-General Sir Herbert Watts KCB KCMG
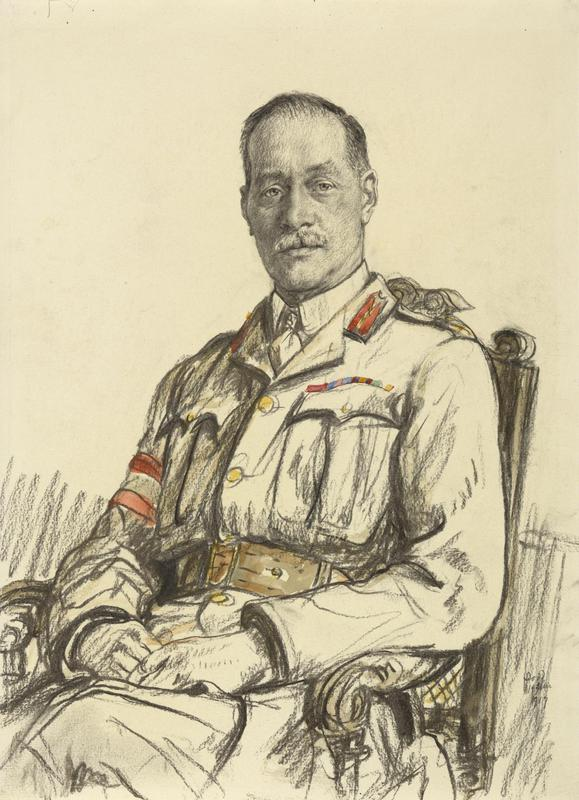
- Portrait by Francis Dodd, 1917
- Born: 14 February 1858
- Died: 15 October 1934 (aged 76)
- Military career
- Allegiance: United Kingdom
- Branch: British Army
- Rank: Lieutenant-General
- Commands: 7th Division; 38th (Welsh) Division; XIX Corps
- Conflicts: First World War
- Awards: Knight Commander of the Order of the Bath; Knight Commander of the Order of St Michael and St George; Legion of Honour

Lieutenant-General Sir Herbert Edward Watts KCB KCMG (14 February 1858 – 15 October 1934) was a British Army officer who commanded 7th Division and later XIX Corps during the First World War.

== Early military career ==
Watts was born on 14 February 1858, the son of R.E.R. Watts, the vicar of Wisbech. He was educated at The King's School, Peterborough and at Tours, and was commissioned as a second lieutenant into a Militia unit, the Royal North Down Militia, in November 1877 He was promoted to lieutenant in August 1879. He transferred as a second lieutenant to the 20th Regiment of Foot in April 1880. In May he transferred again, to the 14th Regiment of Foot (the regiment changed name to become the Prince of Wales's Own West Yorkshire Regiment later the same year). He served with the regiment for 30 years, during which he was promoted to lieutenant on 1 July 1881, captain on 6 March 1889, and major on 20 March 1899.

Following the outbreak of the Second Boer War in October 1899, he served with the 2nd Battalion of his regiment in South Africa 1899–1902. He took part in operations in Natal, including the battles of Vaal Krantz (6-7 February 1900) and the Tugela Heights and Pieter's Hill (14-27 February 1900) leading to the Relief of Ladysmith. In the following months he served in the Natal, and from July to November 1900 in the Transvaal. During the war he was mentioned in dispatches five times and received the brevet promotion to lieutenant colonel on 29 November 1900. He was appointed second-in-command of his battalion on 7 March 1902, and after peace was declared the following month, left South Africa on board the SS Bavarian to arrive in the United Kingdom in June 1902.

He was promoted to substantive lieutenant colonel in February 1904 and commanded a battalion for the next four years, during which time he was promoted again, this time to brevet colonel, in July 1905, before going on half-pay in February 1908 after relinquishing command of the battalion. He was promoted to substantive colonel that month, and, after coming off the half-pay list, finished his military career as the commander of No. 9 District in Eastern Command, holding this post from May 1910 until he retired from the army in May 1914. While holding that post he had been created a Companion of the Order of the Bath (CB) in June 1912.

== First World War ==
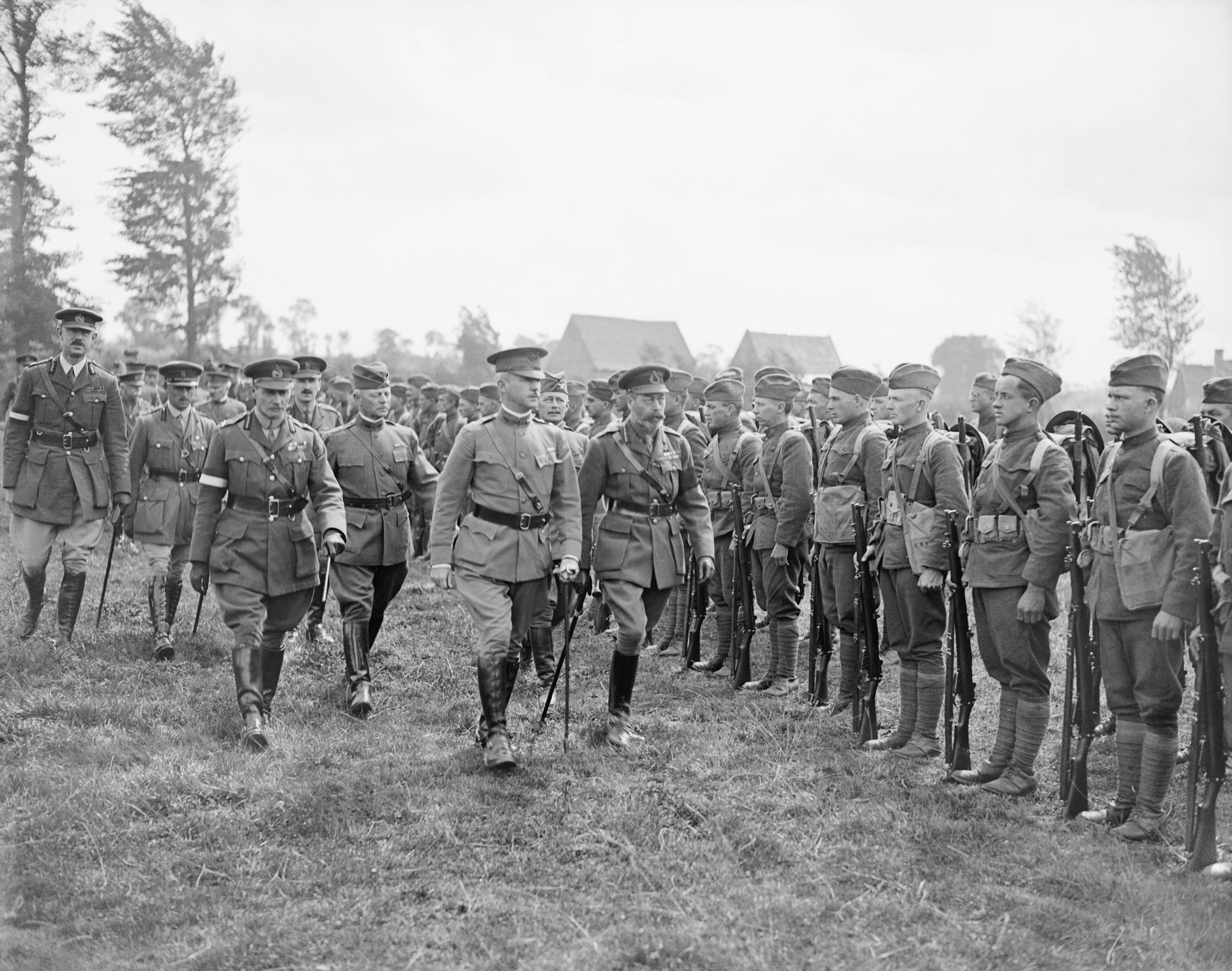
King George V inspects American soldiers of the 108th Regiment, with the 27th Division, 6 August 1918. From left to right: Brigadier General Norman MacMullen, Chief of Staff, XIX British Corps; aide-de-camp to Lieutenant General Sir Herbert Watt GOC XIX Corps; Lieutenant General Sir Herbert Watts; Brigadier General Palmer E. Pierce, commanding 51st Brigade, 27th Division; Major General John F. O'Ryan, the 27th Division commander, and King George V.

Shortly after Watts's retirement, the outbreak of the First World War meant that he returned almost immediately to the army. He was promoted to the temporary rank of brigadier general in August and given command of the recently raised 21st Infantry Brigade in the 7th Division; the division was composed of battalions of the Regular Army recalled from overseas service on the outbreak of war and formed into a new division in England.

Watts remained with the brigade until the Battle of Loos in September 1915, when Major-General Thompson Capper, commanding the division, was killed in action and Watts, promoted to temporary major general, took over as general officer commanding (GOC) of the 7th Division. With the brief exception of a few days in July 1916 as GOC 38th (Welsh) Division - under Watts, the division took its objective, Mametz Wood, though with severe losses - he would remain with the division for the next year and a half.

In January 1917 he was promoted to major general on the active list and later to the temporary rank of lieutenant general in February and became GOC of the XIX Corps, which he led for the rest of the war. He was awarded the Companion of the Order of St Michael and St George in February 1915, as well as the French Legion of Honour in 1919.

Watts was regarded by Field-Marshal Sir Douglas Haig, commander-in-chief (C-in-C) of the British Expeditionary Force (BEF), as "a plucky hard little man" and "a fine leader" but also "a distinctly stupid man [who] lacks imagination". While his courage and fighting spirit were well-regarded, planning and organisation were left to his divisional staff. His personality impressed regimental officers; he required Territorial Force (TF) officers of the 61st (2nd South Midland) Division to repeat after him in chorus a salutary maxim: “The natural corollary of delegation of authority is intelligent supervision”. Watts had never attended the Staff College, Camberley, spending his earlier career entirely on regimental service.

Watts unveiled the War Memorial at Mitcham in Surrey in 1920.

He retired from the army on 14 February 1920 and was granted the honorary rank of lieutenant general.

== Family ==
In 1896 he married Elizabeth Daly.

== Sources ==
- Becke, Archibald F. (1935). Order of Battle of Divisions Part 1–The Regular British Divisions. London: HMSO. OCLC 4405016.
- Farr, Don (2007). The Silent General: Horne of the First Army, A Biography of Haig's Trusted Great War Comrade-in-Arms. Helion. ISBN 978-1-874622-99-4.
- Kennedy, E.J. (1916). With the immortal seventh division. London: Hodder & Stoughton.
- Stack, Capt H. FitzM. (1921). The Worcestershire Regiment in the Great War. Kidderminster: G.T. Cheshire & Sons Ltd. ISBN 978-1843423782.

Military offices
| Preceded by Thompson Capper | GOC 7th Division; 1915–1917 | Succeeded by George Barrow |
| Preceded by New post | GOC XIX Corps; 1917−1918 | Succeeded by Corps disbanded |
