= 8th Infantry Division (United Kingdom) =

Infantry division of the British Army during the First and Second World Wars

8th Division 8th Infantry Division
- Insignia of the 8th Division, First World War
- Active: 1914–19; 1938–40
- Country: United Kingdom
- Branch: British Army
- Type: Infantry
- Size: Division
- Engagements: Battle of Neuve Chapelle; Battle of Aubers Ridge; Battle of the Somme; Battle of Passchendaele

Commanders
- Notable commanders: Bernard Montgomery; Reade Godwin-Austen; William Heneker

The 8th Infantry Division was an infantry division of the British Army that was active in both the First and Second World Wars. The division was first formed in October 1914 during the First World War, initially consisting mainly of soldiers of the Regular Army and served on the Western Front throughout the war, sustaining many casualties, before disbandment in 1919. The division was reactivated in Palestine, under the command of Major-General Bernard Montgomery, in the late 1930s in the years running up to the Second World War before being disbanded in late February 1940. It was briefly reformed in Syria in an administrative role during 1942–43.

== History ==
=== Second Boer War ===
During the Second Boer War, an 8th division was active in South Africa from early 1900 until the war ended in 1902. It was under the command of Lieutenant-General Sir Leslie Rundle, and included a brigade division of Royal Artillery, one squadron of cavalry, one company of Royal Engineers, one company of Army Service Corps, a field hospital, and the following infantry brigades and battalions:

- 16th Brigade (2nd Battalion Grenadier Guards, 2nd Battalion Scots Guards, 2nd Battalion East Yorkshire Regiment, 1st Battalion Leinster Regiment) (commanded by Major-General Barrington Campbell)
- 17th Brigade (2nd Battalion Manchester Regiment, 1st Battalion South Staffordshire Regiment, 1st Battalion Worcestershire Regiment, 2nd Battalion West Kent Regiment) (commanded by Major-General John Edward Boyes)

=== First World War ===
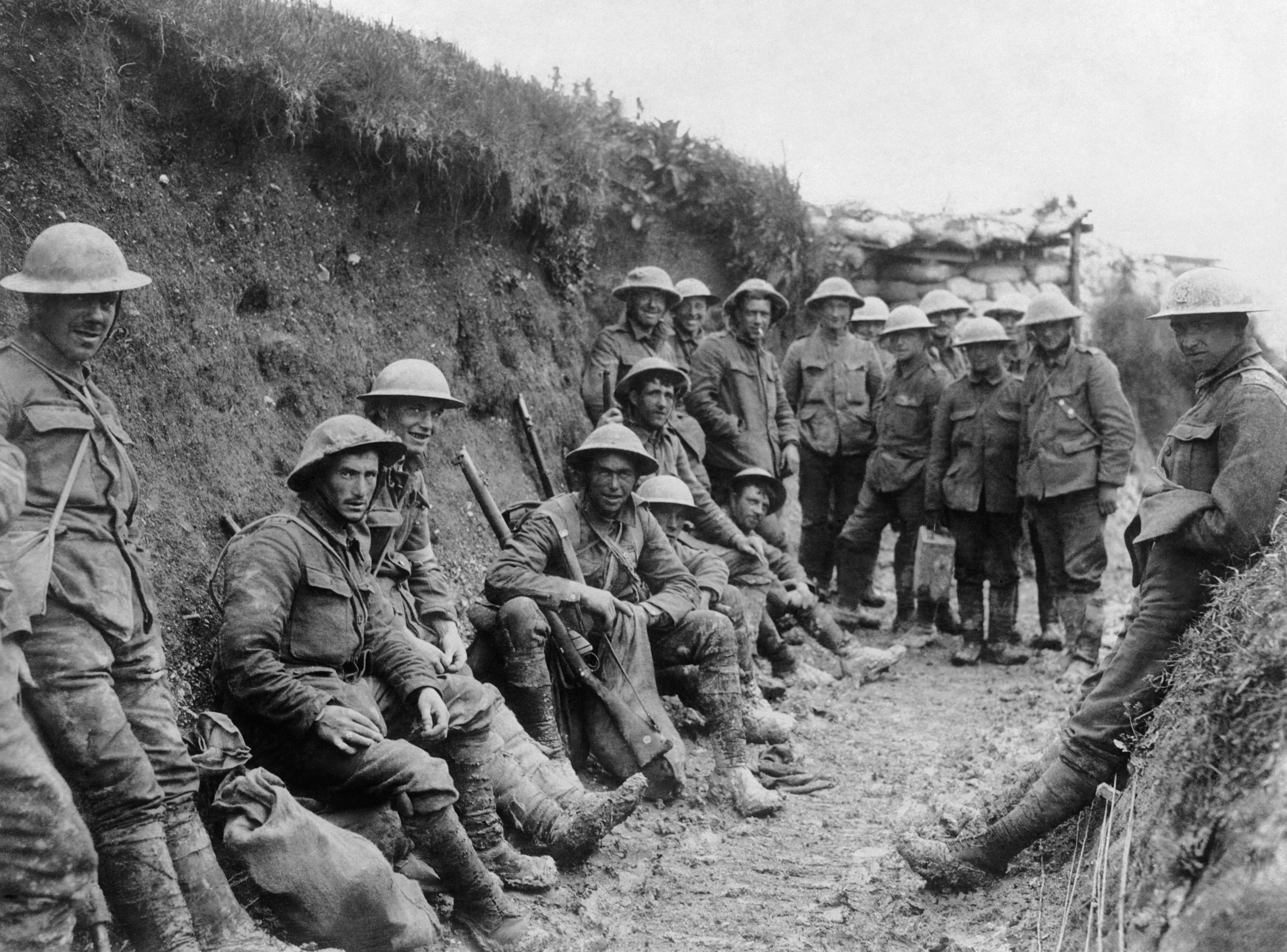
Infantrymen of the Royal Irish Rifles, 25th Brigade during the Battle of the Somme, 1916.

The 8th Division was a Regular Army division that was formed by combining battalions returning from outposts in the British Empire at the outbreak of the First World War. Major-General Francis Davies took command on 19 September 1914. The division moved to France in November 1914, following the First Battle of Ypres. The division fought on the Western Front for the duration of the war, taking part in the Battle of Neuve Chapelle, the Battle of Aubers Ridge, both in 1915, the Battle of the Somme, in 1916, and the Battle of Passchendaele in 1917.

==== Order of battle ====
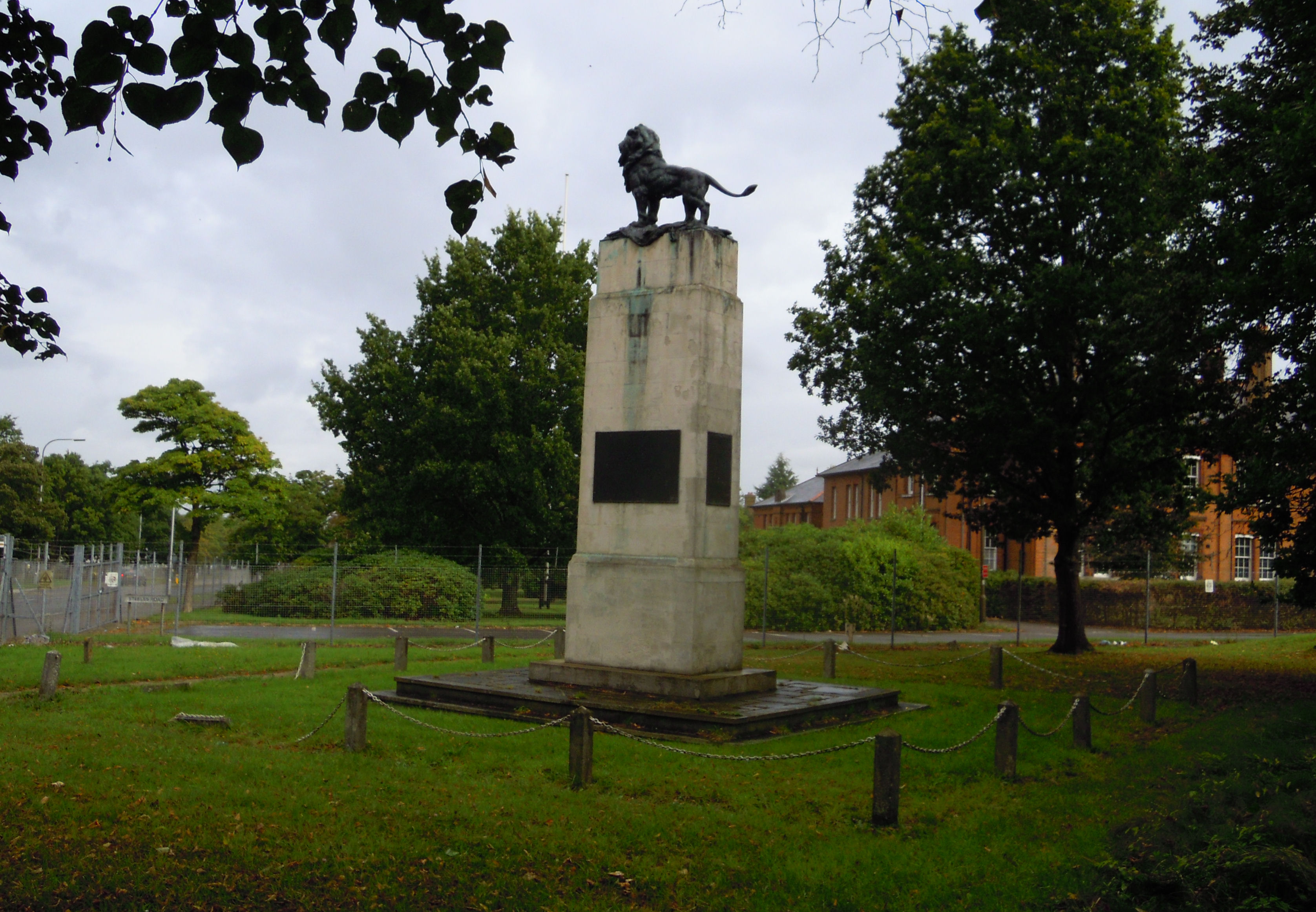
Memorial to the 8th Infantry Division in Aldershot dedicated in 1924

The division had the following organisation:

23rd Brigade

- 2nd Battalion, Devonshire Regiment
- 2nd Battalion, Prince of Wales's Own (West Yorkshire Regiment)
- 2nd Battalion, Cameronians (Scottish Rifles) (until February 1918)
- 1/6th Battalion, Cameronians (Scottish Rifles) (from March 1915 until June 1915)
- 2nd Battalion, Middlesex Regiment
- 1/7th Battalion, Middlesex Regiment (from March 1915 until February 1916)

24th Brigade

- 1st Battalion, Worcestershire Regiment
- 1st Battalion, Sherwood Foresters
- 2nd Battalion, Northamptonshire Regiment
- 1/5th Battalion, the Black Watch (until October 1915)
- 2nd Battalion, East Lancashire Regiment (to 25th Bde. February 1918)
- 1/4th Battalion, Queen's Own Cameron Highlanders (from February 1915 until April 1915)

Between October 1915 and July 1916, the 24th Brigade swapped with the 70th Brigade from the 23rd Division.

25th Brigade

- 2nd Battalion, Princess Charlotte of Wales's (Royal Berkshire Regiment)
- 2nd Battalion, Rifle Brigade
- 1st Battalion, Royal Irish Rifles (until February 1918)
- 2nd Battalion, Lincolnshire Regiment (until February 1918)
- 2nd Battalion, East Lancashire Regiment (from 24th Bde. February 1918)
- 1/8th Battalion, Middlesex Regiment (from August 1915 until October 1915)
- 1/13th (Princess Louise) Kensington Battalion, London Regiment (until May 1915)
- 1/1st (City of London) Battalion, London Regiment (from May 1915 until February 1916)

70th Brigade

The 70th Brigade was from the 23rd Division and was attached to the 8th Division between 18 October 1915, and 15 July 1916, swapping with the 24th Brigade.

Artillery

- V Brigade, Royal Horse Artillery (left 13 January 1917)
- XXXIII Brigade, Royal Field Artillery
- XLV Brigade, Royal Field Artillery
- VIII Heavy Brigade, Royal Garrison Artillery (left 5 March 1915)

Engineers

- 2nd Field Company, Royal Engineers
- 15th Field Company, Royal Engineers
- 1/1st Home Counties Field Company, Royal Engineers (from 2 February 1915; became 490th (Home Counties) Field Company February 1917)

Pioneers

- 22nd (Service) Bn (3rd County Pioneers) Durham Light Infantry (joined 2 July 1916, until 3 July 1918)
- 1/7th Bn, Durham Light Infantry (joined from 50th (Northumbrian) Division 20 June 1918; absorbed 22nd Bn DLI 3 July 1918)

=== Second World War ===
The 8th Infantry Division formation sign in the Second World War

The 8th Infantry Division was never a full-strength formation during the Second World War. In 1939, it was based in Palestine and consisted of two infantry brigades (14th and 16th Brigades). Due to the needs of defence against German and Italian forces, these units were sent to places of need and reformed as different formations. Although the division had infantry, it had no divisional troops due to the shortage of artillery and engineers in the Middle East. Its units were dispersed and the division was disbanded on 28 February 1940.

On 2 June 1942, the division headquarters was reformed as the 8th Division (Syria) following the redesignation of the 5th Cavalry Brigade. The division, in name only, was composed of administration units and intended to provide internal security within Syria, under the command of the Ninth Army. On 3 September, the divisional headquarters role was taken by the headquarters of 89 Sub-Area, Ninth Army (Lines of Communications). In this second incarnation, R.A.C. units from Ninth Army were attached. The division Headquarters were disbanded on 31 October 1943.

==== Order of battle 1939 ====
The division had the following order of battle in 1939:

- 14th Infantry Brigade
  - Brigadier G. Dawes
  - 2nd Battalion, Queen's Royal Regiment (West Surrey)
  - 1st Battalion, Argyll and Sutherland Highlanders
  - 2nd Battalion, Rifle Brigade
- 16th Infantry Brigade
  - Brigadier C.E.N. Lomax
  - 2nd Battalion, Leicestershire Regiment
  - 1st Battalion, South Staffordshire Regiment
  - 1st Battalion, Welch Regiment
  - 1st Battalion, Sherwood Foresters
- 12th Field Company, Royal Engineers
- A divisional reconnaissance regiment of the Royal Armoured Corps

== General Officers Commanding ==
Commanders included:

- 1902–1903 Major-General Sir Hugh McCalmont
- 1903–1905 Major-General Sir Reginald Pole-Carew
- 1905–1906 Major-General Sir William Knox
- 1906–1907 Major-General Lawrence Parsons

First World War

- 19 September 1914 Major-General F.J. Davies
- 27 July 1915 Brigadier-General R. S. Oxley (acting)
- 1 August 1915 Major-General H. Hudson
- 10 December 1916 Major-General W. C. G. Heneker

Second World War

- 1938–1939 Major-General Bernard Montgomery
- 1939–1940 Major-General Reade Godwin-Austen
- 2 June 1942 – 2 September 1942 Brigadier C. E. L. Harris
- 3 September 1942 – 31 October 1943 Colonel (Brigadier, December 1942) R. K. Jago

== See also ==
- List of British divisions in World War I
- List of British divisions in World War II
- British Army Order of Battle (September 1939)

== Bibliography ==
- Becke, Archibald F. (1935). Order of Battle of Divisions Part 1–The Regular British Divisions. London: HMSO. OCLC 4405016.
- Chappel M 1986 British Battle Insignia (1). 1914-18 Osprey Publishing ISBN 9780850457278
- Cole, Howard (1973). Formation Badges of World War 2. Britain, Commonwealth and Empire. London: Arms and Armour Press.
- Joslen, Lt-Col H.F. (2003) [1960]. Orders of Battle, United Kingdom and Colonial Formations and Units in the Second World War, 1939–1945 (Naval & Military Press ed.). London: HMSO. ISBN 9781843424741.
