= 11th Indian Cavalry Brigade =

- Active: 14 November 1917 – March 1919
- Country: British India
- Allegiance: British Crown
- Branch: British Indian Army
- Type: Cavalry
- Size: Brigade
- Engagements: First World War Mesopotamian Campaign Action of Khan Baghdadi Battle of Sharqat

Commanders
- Notable commanders: Br.-Gen. R.A. Cassels

The 11th Indian Cavalry Brigade was a cavalry brigade of the British Indian Army that saw active service in the Indian Army during the First World War. It took part in the Mesopotamian campaign and was broken up soon after the end of the war.

== History ==
The 11th Indian Cavalry Brigade was formed in Mesopotamia in November 1917 with two cavalry regiments and a horse artillery battery from India. The third regiment joined from Corps Troops, and its machine gun squadron and other support units were assembled in Mesopotamia. It did not join the Cavalry Division (Mesopotamia) but served as an independent formation.

The brigade remained in Mesopotamia for the rest of the First World War, taking part in the action of Khan Baghdadi (26–27 Match 1918), the action at Fat-ha Gorge on the Little Zab (23–26 October 1918) and the Battle of Sharqat (28–30 October 1918) under the command of I Corps.

After the Armistice of Mudros, the brigade was not selected to form part of the occupation forces for Mesopotamia. By the end of March 1919 the brigade was broken up.

== Order of battle ==
The brigade commanded the following units in the First World War:

- 7th (Queen's Own) Hussars (joined from 4th (Meerut) Cavalry Brigade, 7th Meerut Divisional Area)
- Guides Cavalry (joined from 1st (Peshawar) Division)
- 23rd Cavalry (Frontier Force) (arrived in Mesopotamia on 10 June 1915 from 3rd Lahore Divisional Area; attached to the 6th Indian Cavalry Brigade in August 1915 before joined Corps Troops)
- 25th Machine Gun Squadron (joined in March 1918)
- W Battery, Royal Horse Artillery (joined from 4th (Meerut) Cavalry Brigade, 7th Meerut Divisional Area)
- 5th Troop, 1st King George's Own Sappers and Miners
- 11th Cavalry Brigade Signal Troop
- 152nd Combined Cavalry Field Ambulance
- 8th Mobile Veterinary Section
- 11th Cavalry Brigade Supply and Transport Company

== Commander ==
The brigade was commanded from 14 November 1917 by Brigadier-General R.A. Cassels.

== See also ==
- 11th Cavalry Brigade (British Indian Army) existed at the same time but was unrelated other than having the same number

== Bibliography ==
- Moberly, Frederick James (1927) [1923]. The Campaign in Mesopotamia 1914–1918. History of the Great War Based on Official Documents. Vol. I. London: HMSO. OCLC 772784341.
- Perry, F.W. (1993). Order of Battle of Divisions Part 5B. Indian Army Divisions. Newport: Ray Westlake Military Books. ISBN 1-871167-23-X.
