= George Barrow (Indian Army officer) =

British general (1864–1959)

Sir George Barrow GCB KCMG
- Sir George Barrow in 1936
- Born: 25 October 1864; Nainital, India
- Died: 28 December 1959 (aged 95)
- Military career
- Allegiance: United Kingdom
- Branch: Indian Army
- Service years: 1884–1929
- Rank: General
- Commands: 35th Scinde Horse; 5th (Mhow) Cavalry Brigade; Yeomanry Mounted Division; 4th Cavalry Division; Eastern Command, India
- Conflicts: Boxer Rebellion; World War I; Third Anglo-Afghan War; World War II
- Awards: Knight Grand Cross of the Order of the Bath; Knight Commander of the Order of St Michael and St George

General Sir George de Symons Barrow, GCB, KCMG (25 October 1864 – 28 December 1959) was a British Indian Army officer who became General Officer Commanding Yeomanry Mounted Division and the 4th Cavalry Division.

== Military career ==
Barrow's military career began when he was commissioned as a lieutenant into the Connaught Rangers in August 1884. Having transferred to the 35th Scinde Horse, British Indian Army in 1886, he served in Waziristan on the North West Frontier of India in 1895 and was promoted to captain on 23 August 1895. He attended the Staff College, Camberley, from 1897 to 1898.

He became aide-de-camp (ADC) to General Sir William Lockhart, Commander-in-Chief in India, in September 1899, then served in China during the Boxer Rebellion the following year. In December 1901 he was appointed ADC to General Sir Arthur Palmer, who had succeeded as Commander-in-Chief in India,. and the following March he also tok the position of Interpreter to the C-in-C. Promotion to major followed on 23 August 1902.

He was appointed Deputy Adjutant and Quartermaster General in India in 1903, Deputy Assistant Adjutant General at the Staff College, Camberley in 1908 and then became a staff officer at the Staff College, Quetta in 1911.

He served in World War I as a staff officer, with the temporary rank of colonel, promoted to that rank in October 1914, and to temporary brigadier general in the same month, while serving with the British Expeditionary Force. In January 1915 he was appointed to the command of a brigade. For his wartime leadership, he was appointed a Companion of the Order of the Bath (CB) in the 1915 Birthday Honours. Promoted to temporary major general and substantive colonel in August 1915, he was, in December, Major General Richard Butler's successor as major general, general staff (MGGS) of the First Army of the BEF, with his major general's rank being made substantive in June. He held this post until January 1917 when he became Herbert Watts's successor as general officer commanding (GOC) of the 7th Division on the Western Front. This only lasted until April, however, as he was then GOC of the Yeomanry Mounted Division and the 4th Cavalry Division in 1917-18, being present at the fall of Jerusalem in Palestine in 1917.

He was appointed a Knight Commander of the Order of St Michael and St George on 9 April 1918.

He served in the Third Anglo-Afghan War in 1919 and became GOC Peshawar District of India in 1919, was promoted to lieutenant general in August 1920, Adjutant-General, India, in 1923 and General Officer Commanding Eastern Command, India, later that year before retiring from the Indian Army in 1929. He was promoted to general, dated March 1925 and relinquished Eastern Command on 1 April 1928. He was promoted to Knight Grand Cross of the Order of the Bath (GCB) in the 1928 Birthday Honours.

== Family ==
Barrow came from a Jewish family and was born on 25 October 1864 at Naini Tal in British India. He had three brothers, two of whom were also soldiers. His father, Lyon de Symons Barrow, was a major-general in the service of the Indian Army then Inspector-General of Police in the United Provinces, and himself had several brothers who were military officers. In 1902 he married Sybilla Way, daughter of Colonel G. Way; their son died in 1944 on active service.

Military offices
Preceded by Herbert Watts	General Officer Commanding the Yeomanry Mounted Division; January 1917 – April 1917	Succeeded by Herbert Shoubridge
Preceded by Sir Walter Delamain	Adjutant-General, India; 1923–1924	Succeeded by Sir John Shea
Preceded by Sir Havelock Hudson	GOC-in-C, Eastern Command, India; 1924–1928	Succeeded by Sir John Shea
