= John Brind =

British Army general (1878–1954)

General Sir John Brind KCB KBE CMG DSO
- Brind in 1936
- Born: 9 February 1878
- Died: 14 October 1954 (aged 76)
- Military career
- Allegiance: United Kingdom
- Branch: British Army
- Service years: 1897–1941
- Rank: General
- Service number: 18615
- Unit: Royal Artillery
- Commands: Southern Command, India; International Force in the Saar; 4th Division
- Conflicts: Second Boer War; First World War; Second World War
- Awards: Knight Commander of the Order of the Bath; Knight Commander of the Order of the British Empire; Companion of the Order of St Michael and St George; Distinguished Service Order; Mentioned in Despatches

General Sir John Edward Spencer Brind, KCB, KBE, CMG, DSO (9 February 1878 – 14 October 1954) was a British Army officer who commanded the 4th Division.

== Military career ==
Educated at Wellington College, Berkshire, and the Royal Military Academy, Woolwich, Brind was commissioned as a second lieutenant in the Royal Artillery in December 1897. He served in the Second Boer War in South Africa from 1899 to 1900, where he took part in operations in the Orange Free State, including engagements near Vet River and Sand River, and was promoted to the rank of lieutenant on 23 December 1900. After the war, he was promoted to the rank of captain on 11 April 1902, and from February 1903 was division adjutant stationed at Malta.

Following the outbreak of the First World War, which saw him attending the Staff College, Camberley as a student, Brind was sent to France as a captain with the Royal Garrison Artillery on 16 August 1914. He then served as a general staff officer, grade 1 with the 56th (London) Division from 6 February 1916 to 31 October 1916, for which he received the temporary rank of lieutenant colonel while employed in this role. He then became a brigadier on the general staff of XI Corps, part of the Fifth Army.

After the war, Brind, who in January 1919 was promoted to brevet colonel, became Deputy Director at the War Office in 1923, colonel Royal Artillery at Aldershot Command in 1925 and brigadier on the general staff at Aldershot Command in 1927.

After becoming major general, Royal Artillery in India in 1930, he went on to be Deputy Chief of the General Staff at Army Headquarters, India in 1931 and then, on 21 July 1933, became general officer commanding (GOC) of the 4th Division, taking over from Major General Charles Bonham-Carter. His final appointments were as Commander-in-Chief, International Force in the Saar in 1934, an appointment he relinquished on 1 March 1935, Adjutant-General, India in 1936, after being promoted to lieutenant general in March 1935, and General Officer Commanding-in-Chief Southern Command in October 1937, serving in that role in the early years of the Second World War before retiring in April 1941. In August 1936 he succeeded Major General Sir George Forestier-Walker as colonel commandant of the Royal Artillery. He relinquished command of the 4th Division and was placed on half-pay on 1 June 1935.

== Honours and awards ==
By 1929, Brind held the Croix de Guerre (France), Legion of Honour (France), the Order of Saints Maurice and Lazarus (Italy), and the Military Order of Aviz (Portugal).

== Retirement ==
In retirement Brind became Civil Defence Deputy Regional Commissioner for the North Eastern Region of England for the latter years of the Second World War. He also wrote a Brind family history.

== Sources ==
- Official History 1918: Brigadier-General Sir James E. Edmonds, Military Operations France and Belgium, 1918 Volume V: 26 September – 11 November: The Advance to Victory 1947 (reprint Imperial War Museum, 1992) (ISBN 1-870423-06-2).
- Smart, Nick (2005). Biographical Dictionary of British Generals of the Second World War. Barnsley, U.K.: Pen & Sword Military. ISBN 1-84415-049-6.

Military offices
Preceded by Charles Bonham-Carter	GOC 4th Division; 1933−1935	Succeeded by James Dick-Cunyngham
Preceded by Sir Walter Leslie	Adjutant-General, India; 1936–1937	Succeeded by Sir Roger Wilson
Preceded by Sir Ivo Vesey	GOC-in-C Southern Command, India; 1937–1941	Succeeded by Thomas Riddell-Webster
