= John Walter (Indian Army officer) =

British Indian Army officer

Major General John Walter CB CSI DSO
- Walter in 1920
- Born: John McNeill Walter; 10 June 1861
- Died: 1951 (aged 89–90)
- Military career
- Branch: British Army
- Service years: 1880–1918
- Rank: Major General
- Unit: Devonshire Regiment
- Conflicts: Second Boer War; First World War
- Awards: Companion of the Order of the Bath; Companion of the Order of the Star of India; Distinguished Service Order

Major General John McNeill Walter CB CSI DSO (10 June 1861 – 1951) was a British Army officer.

== Military career ==
Educated at Cheltenham College, Walter was commissioned as asecond lieutenant into the 12th Regiment of Foot, later the Suffolk Regiment, on 14 January 1880. He was promoted to lieutenant in November 1880 and transferred in 1886 to the Devonshire Regiment as a captain.

He became Deputy Assistant Adjutant-General in India in May 1896, and saw action with the Tochi Field Force and then at the Relief of Ladysmith in October 1899 during the Second Boer War. For his services there he was awarded the Distinguished Service Order (DSO) in the South Africa Honours list, published on 26 June 1902.

He was promoted on 2 October 1906 to lieutenant colonel and became commanding officer (CO) of a battalion of the Devonshire Regiment. He was promoted to brevet colonel on 1 October 1909.

He became an assistant adjutant general in October 1910 and Deputy Adjutant-General at GHQ India in September 1913.

Walter served in World War I as Adjutant-General, India from November 1915 and as Major General in charge of Administration at Northern Command, India from 1917 before retiring at the end of the War. He was promoted to major general on 16 June 1918.

Military offices
Preceded by Fenton Aylmer	Adjutant-General, India; 1915–1917	Succeeded by Sir Havelock Hudson
