= Baron Chetwode =

Barony in the Peerage of the United Kingdom

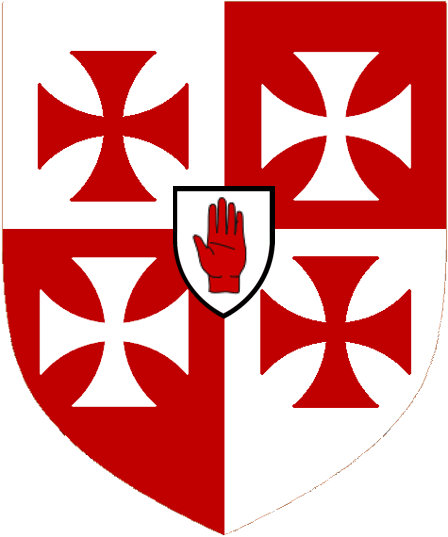
Quarterly Argent and Gules four Crosses patty counterchanged

Baron Chetwode, of Chetwode in the County of Buckingham, is a title in the Peerage of the United Kingdom. It was created in 1945 for the noted military commander Field Marshal Sir Philip Chetwode, 7th Baronet. As of 2014 the titles are held by his grandson, the second Baron, who succeeded in 1950. He is the eldest son of Captain Roger Charles George Chetwode, who was killed in the Second World War.

The Baronetcy, of Oakley in the County of Stafford, was created in the Baronetage of England on 6 April 1700 for the first Baron's ancestor, John Chetwode of Oakley Hall, Staffordshire. He was High Sheriff of Staffordshire in 1698. His grandson, the third Baronet also High Sheriff of Staffordshire in 1756. The fourth Baronet, represented Newcastle-under-Lyme and Buckingham in the House of Commons and was High Sheriff of Cheshire in 1789. His son, the fifth Baronet, High Sheriff of Warwickshire in 1852, married Elizabeth Juliana Newdigate-Ludford, daughter of John Newdigate-Ludford, and in 1826 he assumed by Royal licence the additional surnames of Newdigate-Ludford. He was succeeded by his nephew, the sixth Baronet. He was a Colonel in the Army. On the latter's death in 1905 the title passed to his son, the aforementioned seventh Baronet, who was elevated to the peerage in 1945.

== Chetwode Baronets, of Oakley (1700) ==
- Sir John Chetwode, 1st Baronet (1666–1733)
- Sir Philip Touchet Chetwode, 2nd Baronet (1700–1764)
- Sir John Touchet Chetwode, 3rd Baronet (1732–1779)
- Sir John Chetwode, 4th Baronet (1764–1845)
- Sir John Newdigate-Ludford-Chetwode, 5th Baronet (1788–1873).
- Sir George Chetwode, 6th Baronet (1823–1905)
- Sir Philip Walhouse Chetwode, 7th Baronet (1869–1950) (created Baron Chetwode in 1945)

== Barons Chetwode (1945) ==
- Philip Walhouse Chetwode, 1st Baron Chetwode (1869–1950)
- Philip Chetwode, 2nd Baron Chetwode (b. 1937)

The heir apparent is the present holder's son Hon. Roger Chetwode (b. 1968).
The heir apparent's heir apparent is his son Philip Rowan Chetwode (b. 2002).
