= Philip Chetwode, 1st Baron Chetwode =

British Army officer (1869–1950)

Field Marshal The Right Honourable The Lord Chetwode GCB OM GCSI KCMG DSO
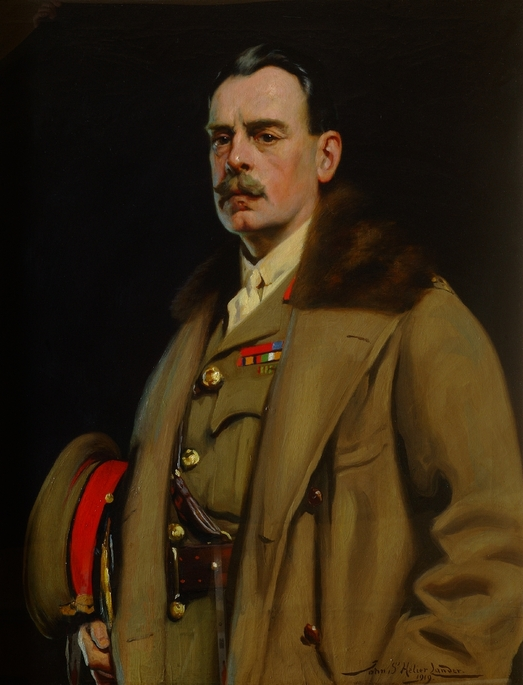
- Portrait by John St Helier Lander, 1919
- Born: 21 September 1869; Westminster, England
- Died: 6 July 1950 (aged 80); Marylebone, England
- Military career
- Allegiance: United Kingdom
- Branch: British Army
- Service years: 1889–1935
- Rank: Field Marshal
- Units: Oxfordshire and Buckinghamshire Light Infantry; 19th Royal Hussars
- Commands: 19th Royal Hussars; London Mounted Brigade; 5th Cavalry Brigade; 2nd Cavalry Division; Desert Column; XX Corps; Aldershot Command; Commander-in-Chief, India
- Conflicts: Second Boer War; Siege of Ladysmith; World War I; Western Front; First Battle of Ypres; Battle of Rafa; First Battle of Gaza; Battle of Beersheba; Battle of Jerusalem
- Awards: Knight Grand Cross of the Order of the Bath; Member of the Order of Merit; Knight Grand Cross of the Order of the Star of India; Knight Commander of the Order of St Michael and St George; Distinguished Service Order
- Other work: Constable of the Tower; President of the Royal Geographical Society

Field Marshal Philip Walhouse Chetwode, 1st Baron Chetwode, GCB, OM, GCSI, KCMG, DSO (21 September 1869 – 6 July 1950), was a senior British Army officer. He saw action during the Second Boer War, during which he was present at the Siege of Ladysmith in December 1899. He saw action again during World War I on the Western Front, taking part in the First Battle of Ypres, and then in the Sinai and Palestine campaign during which he led his corps at the First Battle of Gaza in March 1917, at the Battle of Beersheba in October 1917 and the Battle of Jerusalem in November 1917.

After the War he held a series of senior military appointments including Adjutant-General to the Forces and then Commander in Chief Aldershot Command. He went on to be Chief of the General Staff in India in 1928 and Commander in Chief in India in 1930 and was much concerned with the modernisation and "Indianisation" of the army in India.

== Early life and education ==
Born the son of Sir George Chetwode, 6th Baronet, and Alice Jane Bass (daughter of Michael Thomas Bass the brewer), Chetwode was educated at Eton, where he was an athlete of some distinction, and entered the British Army through the Militia with his first commission being as a second lieutenant in the 3rd (Royal Bucks Militia) Battalion, Oxfordshire Light Infantry (later the Oxfordshire and Buckinghamshire Light Infantry) on 11 April 1888. He then received a commission in the Regular Army, still holding a second lieutenant's rank, with the 19th Hussars on 20 November 1889.

== Early military career ==
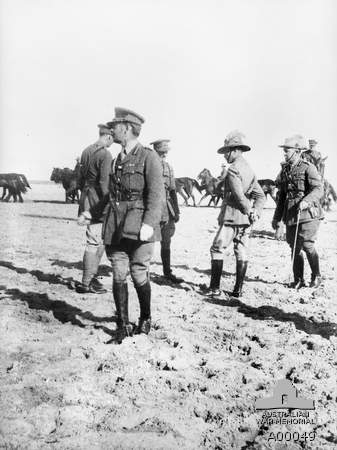
Chetwode (foreground) at El Arish, Egypt, January 1917

Promoted to lieutenant on 6 August 1890, Chetwode first saw active service in the Chin Hills expedition in Burma from 1892 to 1893 and was promoted to captain on 7 February 1897. He served in the Second Boer War where he took part in the actions at Reitfontein in October 1899, Ladysmith in December 1899, Laing's Nek in June 1900 and Belfast in August 1900: he was twice mentioned in despatches and was awarded the Distinguished Service Order. Promoted to major on 21 December 1901, he stayed in South Africa until the end of hostilities. The war ended in late May 1902, and the following month Chetwode returned home in the SS Tagus, arriving at Southampton in July.

He succeeded as 7th Baronet in 1905. In 1906, Chetwode became assistant military secretary to Lieutenant General Sir John French and on 3 January 1908 he was promoted to lieutenant colonel on appointment as commanding officer (CO) of the 19th Hussars.

He commanded the regiment for the next four years, during which time he was promoted to colonel, backdated to 4 October 1911, and was placed on the half-pay list from 3 January 1912. On 1 April he reverted to normal pay and succeeded Colonel Thomas Calley as commander of the London Mounted Brigade, a Territorial Force (TF) formation.

During the Curragh incident in March 1914 Chetwode was offered command of the 3rd Cavalry Brigade when Brigadier General Hubert Gough threatened to resign. He knew that he would be "looked upon by all his brother officers as a scab” but thought it "his duty as a soldier to do as he was ordered & not to meddle in politics". In the event Gough kept his command and Chetwode remained with the London Mounted Brigade, but his willingness to replace Gough caused some ill feeling. Promoted to the temporary rank of brigadier general on 15 May, he was given command of the 5th Cavalry Brigade in August 1914, the same month of the British entry into World War I.

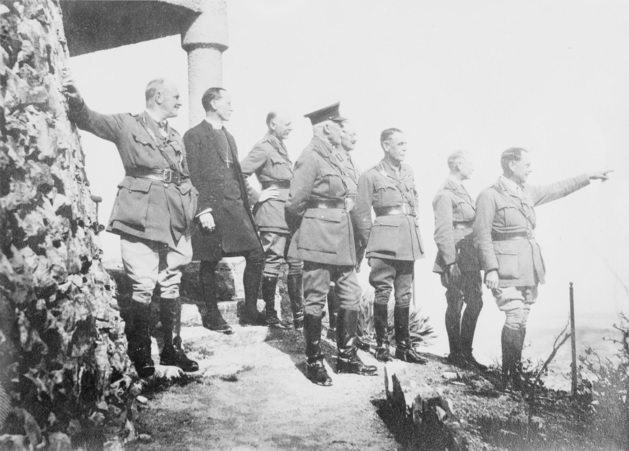
Generals in Jerusalem in March 1918. From left to right are, Sir Edmund Allenby, Rennie MacInnes, Malcolm Donald Murray, the Duke of Connaught, Major General J S M Shea, Sir E S Bulfin, General Sir Harry Chauvel, and Chetwode.

== First World War ==
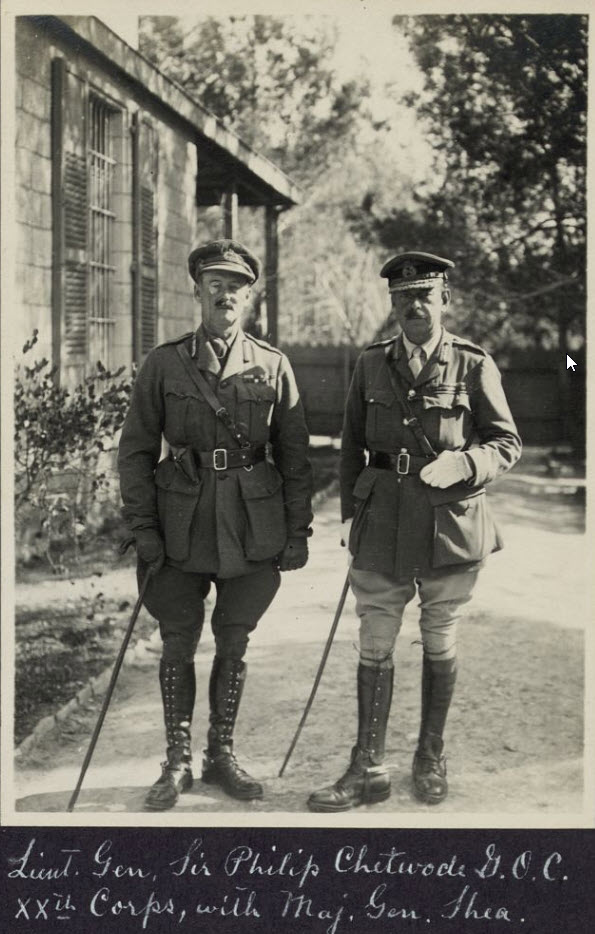
Lieutenant General Philip Chetwode (right), GOC XX Corps, and Major General John Shea, GOC 60th (2/2nd London) Division, June 1917.

During the war, Chetwode served initially on the Western Front: his 5th Cavalry Brigade helped cover the retreat of the British Expeditionary Force (BEF) from the frontier, and checked the pursuing Germans at Cerizy on 29 August 1914. He led the brigade in the First Battle of Ypres in October 1914.

He was appointed to succeed Major General Charles Kavanagh as general officer commanding (GOC) of the 2nd Cavalry Division, and along with it came a temporary promotion to major general on 15 July 1915 and to substantive major general on 1 January 1916 "for distinguished service in the Field".

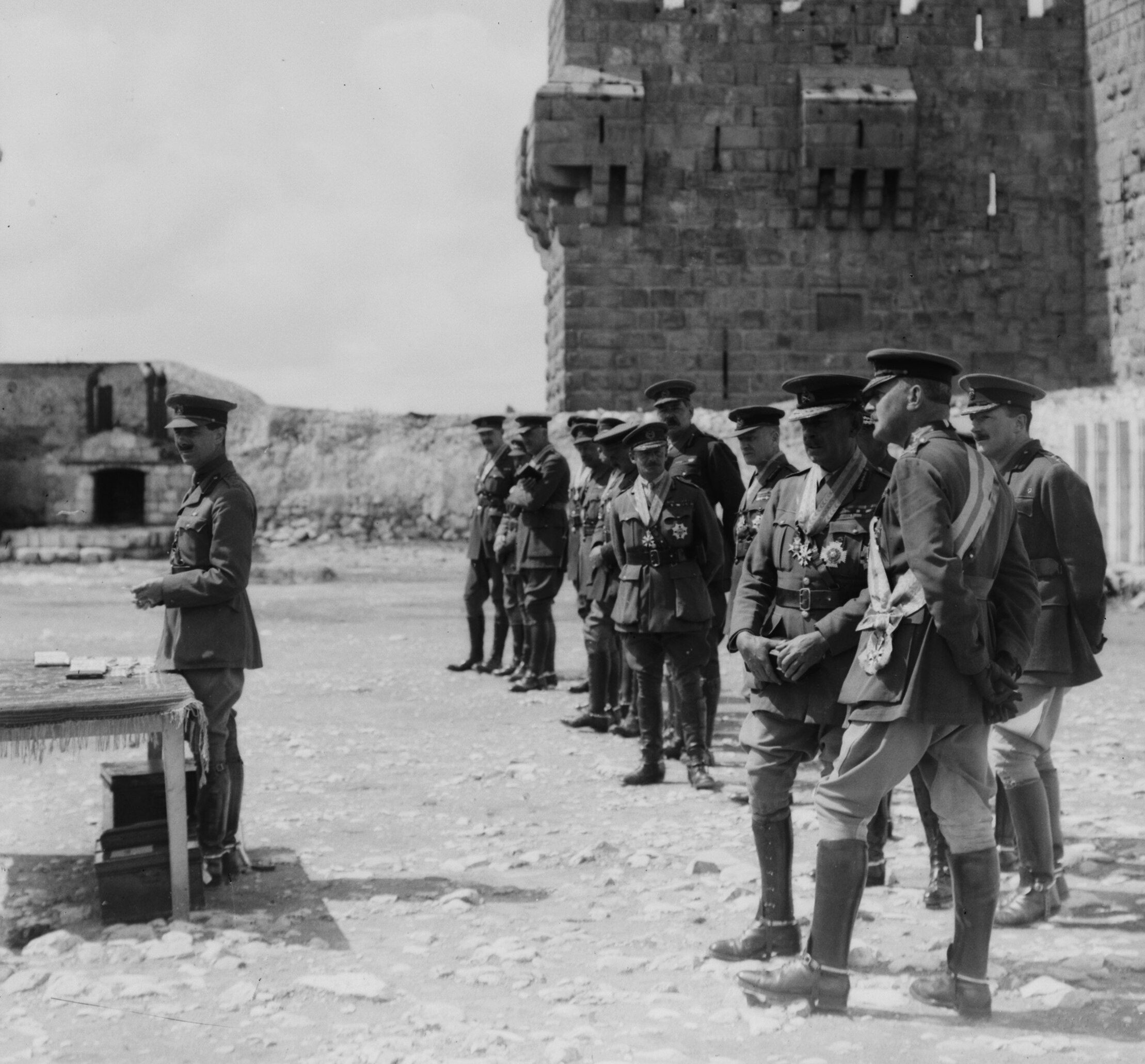
The Duke of Connaught holding an investiture in Jerusalem in February 1918. General Sir Edmund Allenby is conversing with Chetwode in the foreground.

With the war on the Western Front bogged down in trench warfare, Chetwode was transferred to Palestine where he was given command of the Desert Column and promoted to temporary lieutenant general with effect from 22 November 1916. He led the corps at Rafa in January 1917 and at the Third Battle of Gaza in March 1917.

When General Sir Edmund Allenby, a fellow cavalryman, took command of the Egyptian Expeditionary Force (EEF) in Palestine in June 1917, in succession to Lieutenant General Sir Archibald Murray, Chetwode was promoted to command of the newly formed XX Corps. He led his corps to military success at the Battle of Beersheba in October 1917 and at the Battle of Jerusalem in November 1917.

During the Sinai and Palestine campaign he was mentioned in despatches eight times.

== Service in India and after ==
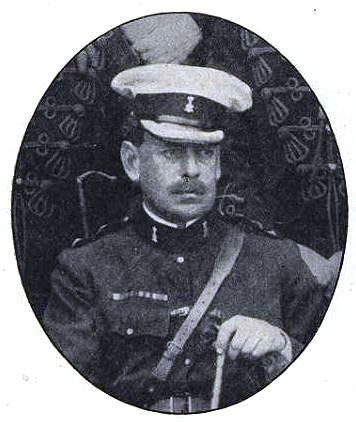
Philip Chetwode c. 1900s

After the war, and following promotion to the permanent rank of lieutenant-general on 1 January 1919, Chetwode was appointed to a number of senior military appointments serving as military secretary from June 1919, deputy chief of the Imperial General Staff from October 1920, succeeding Lieutenant General Sir George Macdonogh as Adjutant-General to the Forces from September 1922 and Commander in Chief Aldershot Command from March 1923. He was appointed colonel of the Royal Scots Greys in September 1925, in succession to Field Marshal Sir William "Wully" Robertson, and promoted to full general on 1 June 1926.

Chetwode became Chief of the General Staff in India in 1928. He relinquished this assignment and was placed on half-pay on 3 July 1930 before being made Commander-in-Chief, India, in November. He was promoted to field marshal on 13 February 1933. In his tenure as Commander-in-Chief, India, Chetwode was an opponent of replacing horses with tanks; he "made the surprising pronouncement that the Army in India would be unlikely to adopt tanks for a very long time, and then only to keep up the momentum of horsed cavalry." He was much concerned with the modernisation and "Indianisation" of the army in India. The main building and its central hall at the Indian Military Academy is named after him. The credo of the academy, engraved on the entrance to the central hall, is a passage from his address delivered at the formal inauguration of the academy in 1932:

The safety, honour and welfare of your country come first, always and every time.

The honour, welfare and comfort of the men you command come next.

Your own ease, comfort and safety come last, always and every time.

This is known as the "Chetwode Motto" and is the motto of the officers passing out from the academy.

Chetwode returned from India in May 1934. In 1937 he declared that as an old soldier he knew what he was talking about when he stated that Britain would not be fighting another war with Germany. He was Constable of the Tower from 1943 to 1948 and also President of the Royal Geographical Society as well as the recipient of an Honorary DCL from Oxford University. He had been appointed a deputy lieutenant of Buckinghamshire on 6 March 1919. He was created Baron Chetwode, of Chetwode in the County of Buckingham, on 10 July 1945 and died at the age of 81 in London on 6 July 1950.

== Family ==
Chetwode married Hester (Star) Alice Camilla Stapleton Cotton and had a son Roger and a daughter Penelope.

- Roger Chetwode married Honourable Molly Berry, daughter of the 1st Viscount Camrose. He was killed on active service on 14 August 1940 at age 34, leaving two sons: Philip, the 2nd Baron Chetwode, and Christopher.
- Honourable Penelope Chetwode married John Betjeman the poet (later Poet Laureate) and had a son Paul and daughter Candida Lycett Green.

Chetwode's sister Florence was married to General Noel Birch.

== Honours and awards ==
=== British ===
- DSO : Companion of the Distinguished Service Order – 20 November 1900 – for services during the operations in South Africa (Second Boer War)
- KCMG : Knight Commander of the Order of St. Michael and St. George – 4 June 1917
- GCB : Knight Grand Cross of the Order of the Bath (GCB) – 3 June 1929
  - KCB : Knight Commander of the Order of the Bath – 11 January 1918
  - CB : Companion of the Order of the Bath – 18 February 1915
- Knight of Justice of the Venerable Order of St. John – 23 December 1930
- GCSI : Knight Grand Commander of the Order of the Star of India – 4 June 1934
- OM : Member of the Order of Merit – 1 January 1936

=== Foreign ===
- Croix de guerre 1914–1918 (France) – 21 May 1917
- Order of the Nile, 2nd Class (Egypt) – 9 November 1918

== Notes ==
Military offices
Preceded by Sir Francis Davies	Military Secretary; 1919–1920	Succeeded by Sir Alexander Godley
Preceded by Sir Charles Harington	Deputy Chief of the Imperial General Staff; 1920–1922	Post abolished
Preceded by Sir George Macdonogh	Adjutant General; 1922–1923	Succeeded by Sir Robert Whigham
Preceded by Sir Thomas Morland	GOC-in-C Aldershot Command; 1923–1927	Succeeded by Sir David Campbell
Preceded by Sir Andrew Skeen	Chief of the General Staff (India); 1928–1930	Succeeded by Sir Cyril Deverell
Preceded by The Lord Birdwood	Commander-in-Chief, India; 1930–1935	Succeeded by Sir Robert Cassels
Honorary titles
Preceded by Sir William Robertson	Colonel of the Royal Scots Greys; 1925–1947	Succeeded by George Todd
Preceded by Sir Claude Jacob	Constable of the Tower of London; 1943–1948	Succeeded by The Earl Wavell
Peerage of the United Kingdom
New creation	Baron Chetwode; 1945–1950	Succeeded by Philip Chetwode
Baronetage of England
Preceded by George Chetwode	Baronet (of Oakley); 1905–1950	Succeeded by Philip Chetwode
