= Robert Cassels =

British Indian Army general

General Sir Robert Cassels GCB GCSI DSO
- Born: 15 March 1876; Bombay, Bombay Presidency, British India
- Died: 23 December 1959 (aged 83); Battle, England, United Kingdom
- Relatives: Field Marshal Sir James Cassels (son)
- Military career
- Allegiance: United Kingdom
- Branch: British Indian Army
- Service years: 1896–1941
- Rank: General
- Commands: Commander-in-Chief, India; Northern Command, India; Peshawar District; 18th Indian Division; 11th Indian Cavalry Brigade
- Conflicts: First World War; Second World War
- Awards: Knight Grand Cross of the Order of the Bath; Knight Grand Commander of the Order of the Star of India; Distinguished Service Order; Officer of the Legion of Honour (France)

General Sir Robert Archibald Cassels, GCB, GCSI, DSO (15 March 1876 – 23 December 1959) was a British Indian Army officer. He was the father of Field Marshal Sir James Cassels.

== Military career ==
Educated at Sedbergh School and the Royal Military College, Sandhurst, Cassels was commissioned into the Indian Staff Corps as a second lieutenant on 22 January 1896. He received promotion to lieutenant on 22 April 1898, to captain on 22 January 1905 and to major on 22 January 1914. Whilst serving in India, Cassels made a single appearance in first-class cricket for the Europeans cricket team against the Parsees at Bombay in the 1902–03 Bombay Presidency Match. Batting twice in the match, he was dismissed for 2 runs in the Europeans first innings by Ardeshir Mehta, whilst in their second innings he was dismissed without scoring by Maneksha Bulsara.

He went on to serve in the First World War, receiving rapid and successive promotion to temporary lieutenant colonel on 19 January 1916, brevet lieutenant colonel on 3 June 1916, brevet colonel in June 1917, and to temporary brigadier general on 6 August 1917. In November 1917 he was appointed Commander of 11th Indian Cavalry Brigade and took his brigade on a great turning movement up the left bank of the River Tigris, outflanking the Turks and helping to bring the Mesopotamian Campaign to an end. Following the war, he briefly commanded the 18th Indian Division while it was stationed in the Middle East.

Cassels was promoted to major general on 1 January 1919 in the Cavalry in India when he was appointed Commander of Peshawar District. He became Adjutant-General, India in 1928, and was promoted to lieutenant general on 14 April (back-dated to 1 May 1927). He was promoted to general on 15 October 1929 and appointed General Officer Commanding-in-Chief of Northern Command, India in 1930. He was next made Commander-in-Chief, India and a Member of the Executive Council of the Governor-General of India in 1935. He continued in that post into the Second World War and retired in 1941.

== Honours ==
- Knight Grand Cross of the Order of the Bath – 1933 Birthday Honours (KCB – 1927 Birthday Honours; CB – c.1918)
- Knight Grand Commander of the Order of the Star of India – 11 July 1940 (CSI – 1920, in recognition of meritorious service in military operations in Kurdistan,)
- Distinguished Service Order – 1918
- Officer of the Legion of Honour – 7 June 1919
- Order of the White Eagle 4th class, with swords - 1917

== Bibliography ==
- Mead, Richard (2007). Churchill's Lions: a biographical guide to the key British generals of World War II. Stroud (UK): Spellmount. ISBN 978-1-86227-431-0.
- Smart, Nick (2005). Biographical Dictionary of British Generals of the Second World War. Barnesley: Pen & Sword. ISBN 1844150496.

Military offices
Preceded by Sir John Shea	Adjutant-General, India; 1928–1930	Succeeded by Sir Norman MacMullen
Preceded by Sir Alexander Cobbe	GOC-in-C, Northern Command, India; 1930–1934	Succeeded by Sir Kenneth Wigram
Preceded by Sir Philip Chetwode	Commander-in-Chief, India; 1935–1941	Succeeded by Sir Claude Auchinleck
