= Walter Delamain =

British Indian Army general (1862–1932)

Lieutenant-General Sir Walter Delamain KCB KCMG DSO
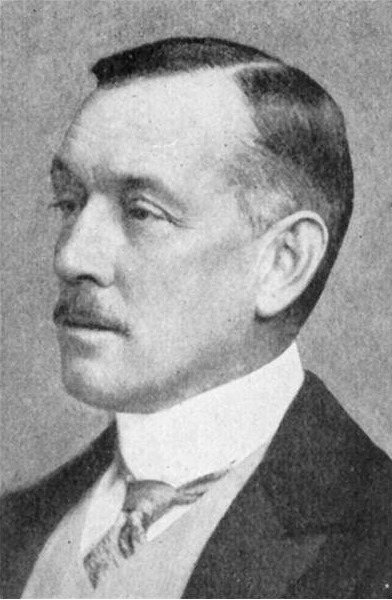
- Born: Walter Sinclair Delamain; 18 February 1862; Saint Helier, Jersey, Channel Islands
- Died: 6 March 1932 (aged 70); Brockenhurst, Hampshire, England
- Military career
- Allegiance: United Kingdom
- Branch: Indian Army
- Service years: 1881–1923
- Rank: Lieutenant-General
- Conflicts: Boxer Rebellion; World War I
- Awards: Knight Commander of the Order of the Bath; Knight Commander of the Order of St Michael and St George; Distinguished Service Order

Lieutenant-General Sir Walter Sinclair Delamain KCB KCMG DSO (18 February 1862 – 6 March 1932) was an officer of the British Indian Army.

== Early service ==
Delamain was born in Saint Helier, the son of Charles Henry Delamain and Susan Sarah Christina Gun. He attended the Royal Military College and was commissioned as a lieutenant in the Princess Charlotte of Wales's (Berkshire Regiment) on 22 October 1881. On 13 January 1885 he was seconded for service with the Indian Staff Corps, and was commissioned as a lieutenant in the Bombay Staff Corps on 1 February 1885, with seniority of 22 October 1881.

He was promoted to captain, 22 October 1892, and given the temporary rank of Major, 4 November 1898.

As Commandant of the Native Military Base Depot during the Boxer Rebellion he was mentioned in despatches. On 26 May 1901 he was appointed a Special Service Officer on the staff of the China Field Force, and his rank of major was made substantive on 10 July 1901. In October 1902 he was in command of a detachment from the 23rd Bombay Rifles (renamed as the 123rd Outram's Rifles the following year) sent via Aden to British Somaliland as reinforcement during the Dervish War. In 1905 he was again mentioned in despatches for his service with the Outram's Rifles, commanding the escort to the Aden Boundary Commission for eight months, was awarded the Distinguished Service Order on 14 April, and promoted to lieutenant-colonel, with seniority of 12 January 1905. On 12 January 1908 he was made brevet colonel, and substantive colonel on 1 January 1911.

He was appointed assistant adjutant-general on 17 November 1912 and made a CB in January 1914 in the 1914 New Year Honours.

== First World War ==
Delamain was appointed temporary brigadier-general, 27 September 1914. He commanded the 16th (Poona) and 17th (Ahmednagar) Brigades at the Battle of Es Sinn. His conduct was described as "admirable" in General Nixon's despatch, and Delamain was promoted to major-general, 29 October 1915, for distinguished service in the field. He became a prisoner of war on 29 April 1916.

== Post-war ==
On 14 November 1919 Delamain was given command of a division, and he was promoted to lieutenant-general on 1 April 1920, with seniority later backdated to 21 December 1919. He served as Adjutant-General, India from 10 November 1920 to 28 March 1923, when he retired from the Indian Army.

Delamain was also colonel of the 117th Mahrattas from 28 October 1921 until he reached the age limit, being replaced by Major-General R.C. Wilson on 18 February 1932.

== Bibliography ==
- Davies, Frank; Maddocks, Graham (2014) [1995]. Bloody Red Tabs: General Officer Casualties of the Great War 1914–1918. Pen and Sword Books. ISBN 978-1-78346-237-7.

Military offices
Preceded by Sir Havelock Hudson	Adjutant-General, India; 1920–1923	Succeeded by Sir George Barrow
