= XIX Corps (United Kingdom) =

- XIX Corps formation badge.
- Active: World War I
- Country: United Kingdom
- Branch: British Army
- Type: Field corps
- Part of: Second Army
- Engagements: World War I: Battle of Passchendaele; Battle of the Somme 1918; Advance in Flanders; Final Advance in Flanders

The British XIX Corps was a British infantry corps during World War I.

== History ==
British XIX Corps was formed in France in February 1917 and fought at the Battle of Passchendaele in Autumn 1917. In Spring 1918 it was driven back 20 miles in five days and found itself in disarray. By November 1918 the Corps, as an element of Second Army, was one of the most northerly British military formations in France.

=== Order of battle on 11 November 1918 ===
Prior to the armistice, the corps was on the Second Army's left, with the 41st Division on the left, 35th in the centre and 31st on the right. It was composed of the following units, the 35th Division having been transferred from the II Corps on 3 November 1918:

- 41st Division (Major General Lawford)
- 31st Division (Major General Campbell)
- 35th Division (Major General Marinden)
- Corps Troops
  - V/XIX Heavy Trench Mortar Battery
  - 19 Cyclist Battalion
  - XIX Corps Signal Company

== General Officers Commanding ==
Commanders included:

- February 1917 – November 1918 Lieutenant General Herbert Watts
