= Francis Davies (British Army officer) =

British Army general

General Sir Francis Davies KCB KCMG KCVO
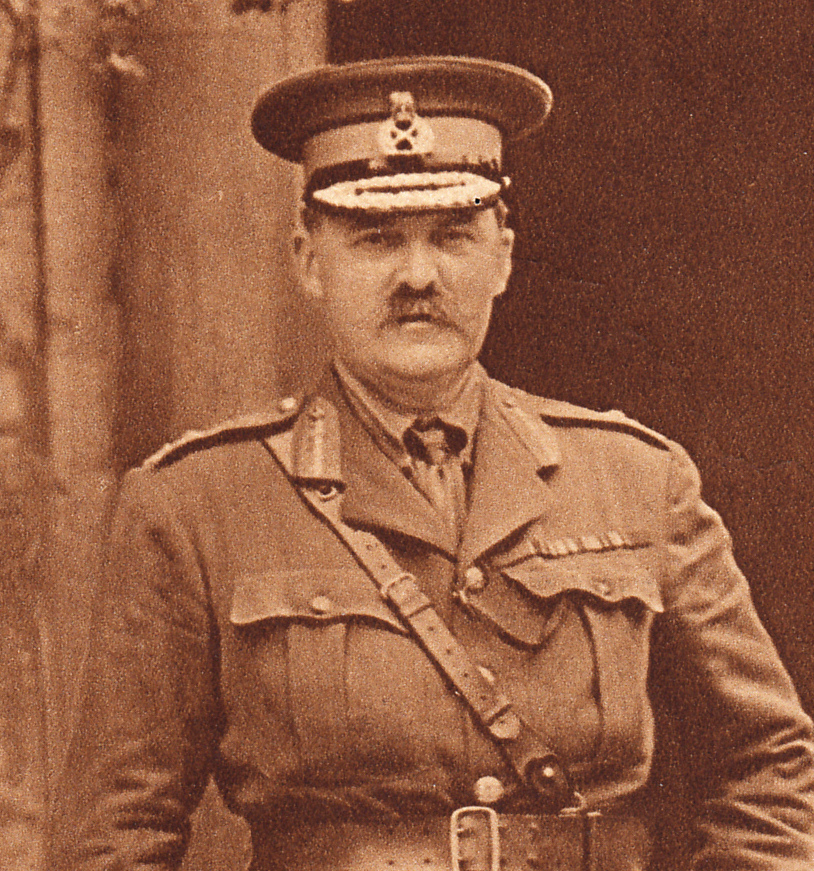
- Davies in c. 1916
- Born: 3 July 1864; London, England
- Died: 18 March 1948 (aged 83); Pershore, Worcestershire, England
- Military career
- Allegiance: United Kingdom
- Branch: British Army
- Service years: 1881–1923
- Rank: General
- Nickname: "Joey"
- Units: Worcestershire Regiment; Grenadier Guards
- Commands: Scottish Command; VIII Corps; 8th Division; 1st Guards Brigade
- Conflicts: Second Boer War; First World War
- Awards: Knight Commander of the Order of the Bath; Knight Commander of the Order of St Michael and St George; Knight Commander of the Royal Victorian Order

General Sir Francis John Davies, KCB, KCMG, KCVO (3 July 1864 – 18 March 1948) was a senior British Army officer who commanded the 8th Division during the First World War.

== Early life and education ==
Davies was born in London, the son of Lieutenant General Henry Fanshawe Davies and his wife, Ellen Christine Alexandra Hankey. His grandfather was General Francis John Davies (brother and heir of Thomas Henry Hastings Davies, MP for Worcester) and his great-grandfather was Admiral of the Fleet Sir Thomas Byam Martin. The family seat was Elmley Castle, Pershore, Worcestershire. His younger brother was Major General Henry Rodolph Davies. He was educated at Eton College.

== Early military career ==
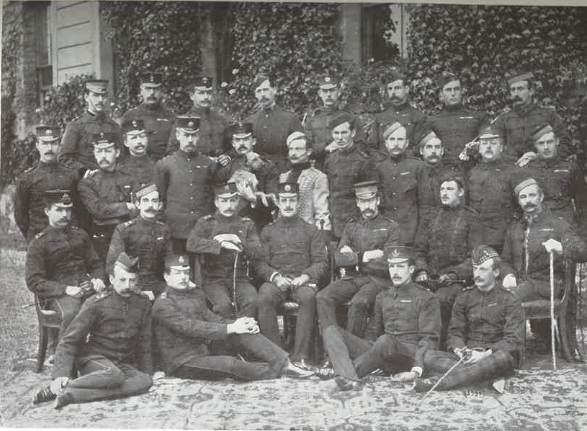
The Staff College, Camberley, class in 1890. Stood in the second row, fifth from the left, is Lieutenant F. J. Davies.

Davies was commissioned as a second lieutenant into the part time 4th (Worcestershire Militia) Battalion, Worcestershire Regiment in July 1881. He transferred from the Worcesters to a Regular Army commission in the Grenadier Guards, the same regiment in which his father and grandfather had served, as a lieutenant in May 1884.

He was promoted to lieutenant in May 1890 and attended the Staff College, Camberley, from 1890–1891. He became adjutant to the 2nd Battalion of his new regiment in August 1893. Promoted to captain in October 1895, he was, in 1897, posted to South Africa where he became a deputy assistant adjutant general (DAAG) for the Cape of Good Hope, and received a further promotion to major in July 1899.

After the outbreak of the Second Boer War in October 1899, he served as a DAAG, responsible for intelligence at army headquarters in South Africa. He was appointed acting commissioner of police for Johannesburg in 1900, and received a brevet promotion to lieutenant colonel dated 29 November 1900.

Davies returned to the United Kingdom in 1902 and was temporarily employed in the intelligence department until he became deputy assistant quartermaster general (DAQMG) at the War Office on 7 September 1902. He was then appointed assistant director of military operations, for which he was raised to the brevet rank of colonel on 1 April. He was the British delegate to the International Conference on Wireless Telegraphy in Berlin in 1906 and then, promoted to lieutenant colonel while serving on half-pay, assistant quartermaster general for Western Command in 1907. He was promoted to colonel in February 1907 and made a Companion of the Companion of the Order of the Bath in the 1907 Birthday Honours in June. After serving as a general staff officer, grade 1 from January 1908, he was then promoted to the temporary rank of brigadier general in November 1909 and made general officer commanding (GOC) of the 1st (Guards) Brigade, taking over from Arthur Henniker-Major.

Managing to retain his temporary rank, he then took over as brigadier general, general staff (BGGS) of Aldershot Command, in succession to Brigadier General William Robertson, in August 1910. He was promoted to major general in May 1913 and, in October of that year, became director of staff duties at the War Office.

== First World War ==
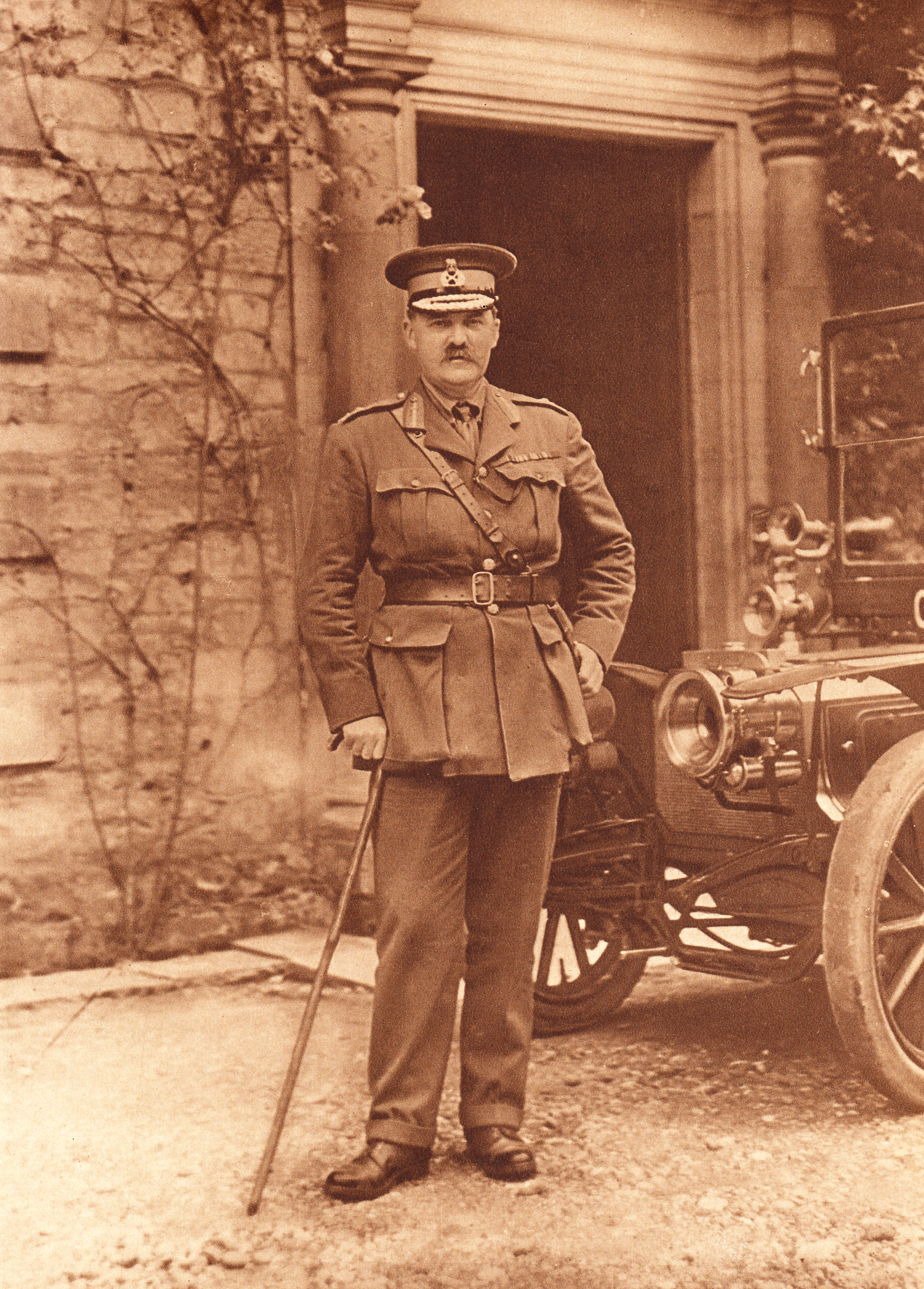
Davies in France, 1916.

In October 1914, two months after the British entry into World War I, Davies was appointed as GOC of the 8th Division, which had been created only recently from Regular Army units scattered around the British Empire. The division, along with its GOC, was soon sent to the Western Front, where the rest of the British Expeditionary Force (BEF) was already serving, and where the division would remain for the rest of the war. The 8th, serving under the command of Lieutenant-General Sir Henry Rawlinson's IV Corps, saw major action for the first time in 1915 at the Battle of Neuve Chapelle in March and later in the Battle of Aubers Ridge, two months later, both of which resulted in heavy casualties. He was appointed a Knight Commander of the Order of the Bath (KCB) in the 1915 Birthday Honours.

Towards the end of July Davies was posted away from the fighting in France and Belgium to take over the command of VIII Corps, then heavily engaged in the Gallipoli campaign, from Lieutenant-General Aylmer Hunter-Weston. Davies, promoted to the temporary rank of lieutenant-general, took over as its GOC on 8 August from Major-General William Douglas, GOC 42nd (East Lancashire) Division, who in turn was in temporary command of the corps as well as his own division. He brought with him from the fierce fighting on the Western Front valuable combat experience and, it is said, "his contribution to what was a very difficult period (and the greater part) of the campaign has been largely overlooked. He inherited a shattered and demoralised corps, starved of resources and reinforcement. Over the five months of his tenure his ideas and energy were the catalyst for a myriad of tactical and systematic improvements which greatly improved the fighting efficiency of his force, allowing his troops to achieve tactical superiority over the enemy facing them".

In the aftermath of the evacuation of British and Allied forces from Gallipoli in January 1916, Davies was moved on to succeed Lieutenant General The Hon. Sir Julian Byng as GOC of IX Corps, which had also fought at Gallipoli but had now been relocated to the Western Front. Davies was in command only until June when he returned to the United Kingdom to serve as military secretary at the War Office, taking over from Major General Sir Frederick Robb and retaining his temporary lieutenant general's rank. He held this post until after the end of the war, finally relinquishing to Lieutenant General Sir Philip Chetwode in June 1919. His rank of lieutenant general became substantive in January 1917.

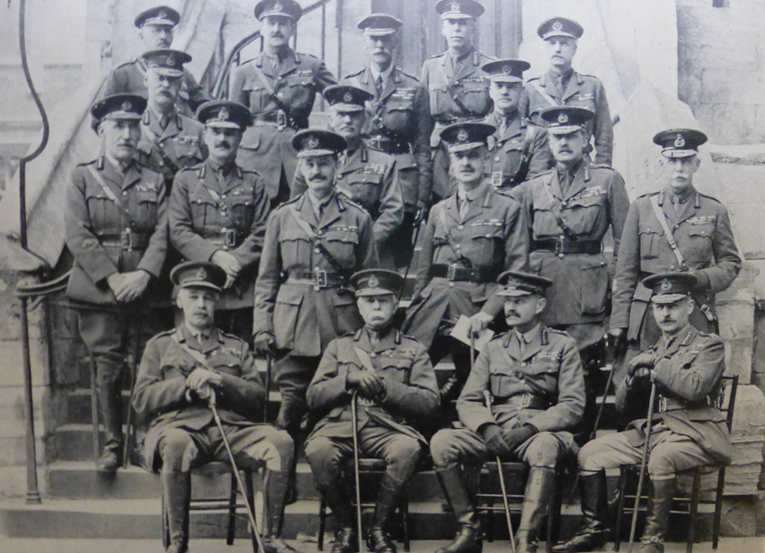
Eighteen Old Etonian generals revisit Eton, May 1919. Lieutenant General Davies stands in the middle row, second from the right.

== Postwar and final years ==
Later that year, Davies was appointed general officer commanding-in-chief (GOC-in-C) of Scottish Command in June 1919, taking over from Lieutenant General Frederick McCracken. After being promoted to the rank of full general in July 1921, and after serving as lieutenant of the Tower of London, which he had been appointed to in June 1923, he retired from the army in April 1926. He had been appointed an aide-de-camp general to King George V in April 1922.

== Freemasonry ==
From 1919 until his death in 1948, Davies served as Provincial Grand Master of Freemasons in Worcestershire. During his time in office, 50 new masonic lodges were dedicated and he personally participated at 41 of these. From 1935 to 1947 he also held the position of Deputy Grand Master of the United Grand Lodge of England, paying official visits to numerous Provinces in this country and to many Grand Lodges overseas.

Military offices
New command	GOC 8th Division; 1914–1915	Succeeded by Havelock Hudson
Preceded by Sir Frederick Robb	Military Secretary; 1916–1919	Succeeded by Sir Philip Chetwode
Preceded by Sir Frederick McCracken	GOC-in-C Scottish Command; 1919–1923	Succeeded by Sir Walter Braithwaite
