= Havelock Hudson =

British Indian Army officer during World War I

Sir Havelock Hudson GCB KCIE
- Born: 22 June 1862
- Died: 25 December 1944 (aged 82)
- Military career
- Allegiance: United Kingdom
- Branch: British Army
- Service years: 1881–1924
- Rank: General
- Commands: Eastern Army in India; 8th Division
- Conflicts: Boxer Rebellion; First World War
- Awards: Knight Grand Cross of the Order of the Bath; Knight Commander of the Order of the Indian Empire

General Sir Havelock Hudson, GCB, KCIE (22 June 1862 – 25 December 1944) was a British Indian Army officer who served as General Officer Commanding 8th Division during the First World War.

== Military career ==
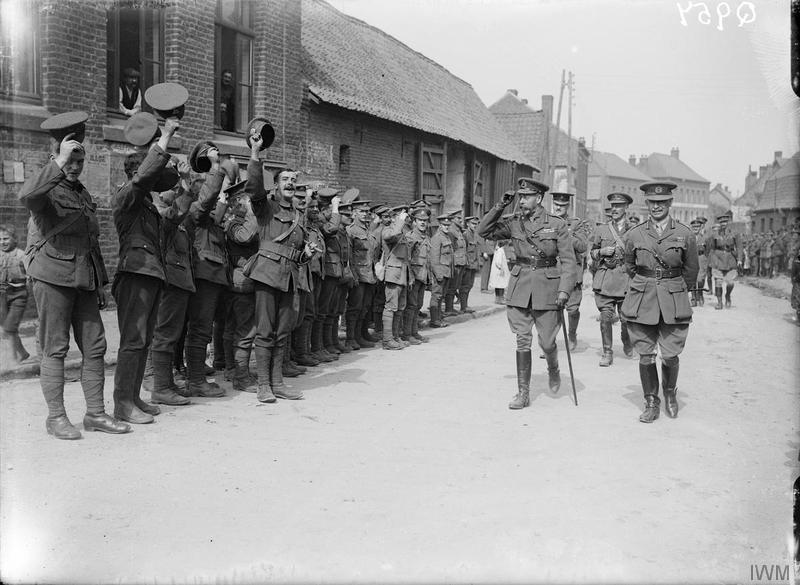
H.M. The King George V with Major-General Havelock Hudson, GOC of the 8th Division, walking through the streets of Fouquereuil, where the King was cheered by men of the 25th Brigade, 8th Division, 11 August 1916.

Hudson was commissioned into the Northamptonshire Regiment as a lieutenant on 22 October 1881. He transferred to the Indian Staff Corps in 1885, and became an officer of the 19th Lancers from that year. Promoted to captain on 22 October 1892, he served on the staff during the North West Frontier campaign in 1897. He briefly acted as deputy assistant quartermaster-general at Indian army headquarters from June–August 1900, he then was appointed a staff officer in the China Field Force for the Boxer Rebellion later that year. In 1901 he took part in the second Miranzai expedition.

Hudson commanded the 19th Lancers from 4 February to 27 August 1910. He was appointed a General Staff Officer Grade 1 with the Directorate of Staff Duties and Military Training on 1 July 1910. He was appointed Commandant of the Cavalry School at Sangor in India from 1 July to 30 September 1912 and became Brigadier-General on the General Staff of the Northern Army on 1 October 1912.

Hudson served in the First World War as Brigadier-General on the General Staff of the Indian Corps from 1914, then was appointed general officer commanding (GOC) of the 8th Division on the Western Front from 31 July 1915. He led the division in the attack on Ovillers, losing 5,400 men. He relinquished command of the division on 8 December 1916, to William Heneker and was appointed Adjutant General, India from 5 February 1917 until 30 October 1920, by which time the war was over.

Following the Amritsar massacre in 1919 it fell to Hudson, in his capacity as Adjutant-General, to tell Brigadier General Reginald Dyer that he was relieved of his command. He was appointed General Officer Commanding-in-Chief, the Eastern Army in India on 1 November 1920, before retiring in 1924.

In retirement Hudson was a member of the Council of India.

Military offices
Preceded by Francis Davies	GOC 8th Division; 1915–1916	Succeeded by William Heneker
Preceded by John Walter	Adjutant-General, India; 1917–1920	Succeeded by Sir Walter Delamain
New command	GOC-in-C, Eastern Command, India; 1920–1924	Succeeded by Sir George Barrow
