= William Heneker =

Canadian soldier who served with the British Army

General Sir William Heneker KCB KCMG DSO
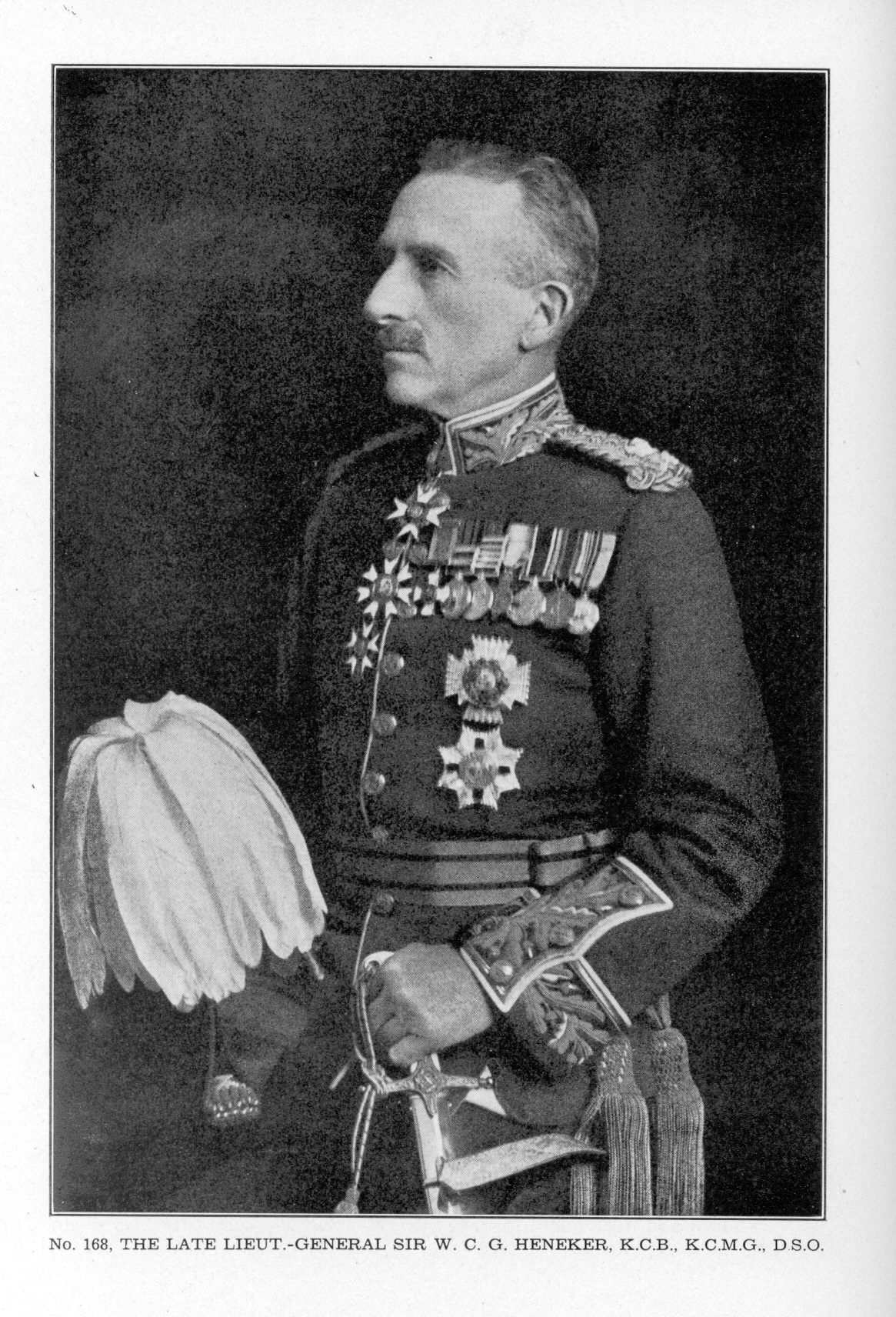
- Heneker in c. 1932
- Born: William Charles Giffard Heneker; 22 August 1867; Sherbrooke, Canada
- Died: 24 May 1939 (aged 71); London, England
- Military career
- Allegiance: United Kingdom
- Branch: British Army
- Service years: 1888–1932
- Rank: General
- Units: Connaught Rangers; North Staffordshire Regiment
- Commands: Southern Command, India; 3rd Division; Rhine Garrison; Independent Division, Rhine Army; 8th Division; 190th Infantry Brigade; 54th Infantry Brigade; 1st Infantry Brigade, Quetta; Rawalpindi Infantry Brigade; 1st Peshawar Infantry Brigade; 2nd Battalion, North Staffordshire Regiment
- Conflicts: Anglo-Aro War; North-West Frontier; First World War
- Awards: Knight Commander of the Order of the Bath; Knight Commander of the Order of St Michael and St George; Distinguished Service Order; Mentioned in Despatches; Commander of the Legion of Honour (France)
- Other work: Author of Bush Warfare (1907)

General Sir William Charles Giffard Heneker, KCB, KCMG, DSO (22 August 1867 – 24 May 1939) was a Canadian soldier who served with the British Army in West Africa, India, and then later on the Western Front during the First World War, where he notably commanded the 8th Division on the Western Front. A notable military strategist and tactician, he became one of the most experienced and highly decorated Canadians in the British Empire, and one of only a handful of Canadians to reach the rank of full general.

== Early life and education ==
William Charles Giffard Heneker, "descended from an old Staffordshire family", was born in Sherbrooke, Quebec, on 22 August 1867, "the year in which Canada achieved Dominion status". He was the son of architect Richard William Heneker (1823–1912) and Elizabeth, daughter of Captain Edward Tuson of the Royal Navy. He received his early education at Bishop's College School in Lennoxville, Quebec, and then later entered military life when he enrolled at the Royal Military College of Canada in Kingston, Ontario on 1 September 1884. Assigned student #168, he graduated with the rank of sergeant and first class grades on 28 June 1888, exactly "twenty-six years to the day before the assassination of the Archduke Franz Ferdinand in Sarajevo" which would change the young Heneker's life "and the world he grew up in forever".

== Military career ==
During the first several decades of RMC's existence it was common practice for the War Office in London to offer commissions in the British Army to the best Canadian graduates. Heneker accepted an Imperial commission with the 1st Battalion, Connaught Rangers, as a second lieutenant on 5 September 1888, which, "given his Irish connections", was "not uncongenial". At the time the unit was serving in India and Heneker joined the regiment there. He was promoted to lieutenant 12 February 1890, and later received his promotion to captain on 10 March 1897. Soon after he was seconded to the Niger Coast Protectorate which "did most to shape his pre-war career".

Between 1897 and 1906, Heneker served in the West African theatre, and participated in a variety of campaigns ranging from peacetime military engagement, to counterinsurgency, to major combat operations. He served in the 1899 Benin Territories Expedition as intelligence and survey officer, and was mentioned in dispatches for his services. Heneker commanded the Ulia and Ishan Expeditions (March–May 1901, for which he was again mentioned in despatches), the Ibeku-Olokoro operations, Afikpo operations, and also commanded No.4 Column in the Anglo-Aro War (November 1901 to March 1902; mentioned in despatches). He became brevet major on 31 July 1901, for services during operations in Esan and Ulia country, and was appointed a Companion of the Distinguished Service Order (DSO) for services during the Anglo-Aro war. The following year he served as second-in-command of the Southern Nigeria Regiment, in Southern Nigeria, and also served with the Royal West African Frontier Force. Heneker also waged a notable campaign against Chief Adukukaiku of Iggara, for which he again received a mention in dispatches. Heneker was promoted to brevet lieutenant colonel 21 August 1903, but received his substantive British Army rank of major on 16 February 1907. He was later awarded the brevet rank of colonel on 24 October 1907, while at the same time being made an aide-de-camp to King George V.

Heneker was eventually posted to Southern Africa where he was deputy assistant adjutant and quartermaster general, Orange River Colony District from 21 April 1906 to 20 April 1910.

He then served briefly in India and the North-West Frontier. As lieutenant colonel, he commanded the 2nd Battalion of the North Staffordshire Regiment at Peshawar, India 10 April 1912. He served as temporary brigade commander, 1st Peshawar Infantry Brigade in 1912, and then later briefly as a temporary brigade commander, Rawalpindi Infantry Brigade from 1913 to 1914. He was finally appointed commander, 1st Infantry Brigade, Quetta, in October 1914. During this time Heneker continued to serve as one of the King's aides-de-camp, an appointment he received in October 1907 and held until June 1917. William Heneker was a resourceful and skilled soldier as well as an exceptional tactician. For his military services in West Africa he was invested by King Edward VII on 18 December 1903 with the DSO.

== Military thought ==
In 1907 Heneker published a book examining tactical innovation in small wars titled Bush Warfare. The first serious analysis of the characteristics of small wars since the 1896 publication of British Army Lieutenant Colonel Callwell's Small Wars, Heneker's own study became required reading and a resource for all commanders until new doctrinal publications appeared in the 1930s. In 2007, Canadian military historian Andrew Godefroy edited a new edition of Bush Warfare in honour of the centenary of its original publication.

== First World War ==
Several months after the outbreak of war, Heneker was finally assigned to active duty in Europe. After being promoted to the temporary rank of brigadier general in March 1915 he became general officer commanding (GOC) of the 18th (Eastern) Division's 54th Infantry Brigade, a Kitchener's Army formation made up of civilian volunteers for the army, then in training at Colchester, Essex. The division was commanded by Major General Ivor Maxse, "an excellent judge of men" who "immediately recognized Heneker's qualities", and left to join the British Expeditionary Force (BEF) on the Western Front in July.

Whilst leading his brigade, Heneker was severely wounded on 10 December:

Méaulte. 10th December. 3 pm. Brigadier wounded in left leg by long-range indirect machine-gun fire whilst walking down the hill south of Canterbury Avenue. Wound severe but apparently not serious, bullet entered leg but did not come out. He was taken to dressing station at Citadel thence to Corbie.

Heneker, put out of action for the next ten months as a result of this injury, was promoted to substantive colonel on 10 April 1916, though he retained his temporary appointment as a brigadier general. He therefore missed the 18th Division's "auspicious debut on the Somme, when it was one of the few units to capture all its objectives on 1 July", the first day of the Somme offensive.

Anxious to return to command, and after badgering the military secretary of the BEF, Major General William Peyton, for a new command, he was appointed to lead the 190th Infantry Brigade, 63rd (Royal Naval) Division, from 29 October. "Heneker's luck had come full circle".

Heneker's next appointment was to the command of the 8th Division, "a Regular Army formation", becoming its third and final commander of the war. He would serve as the division's GOC from 9 December 1916 until March 1919, becoming the twelfth longest serving British divisional commander in the BEF by the war's end. He took over from Major General Havelock Hudson, "an Indian Army cavalry officer with some expertise as an administrative staff officer". As a result of new position he was promoted to temporary major general, having risen from lieutenant colonel to temporary major general in twenty-nine months of war, "during ten of which he had been hors de combat". He was promoted to substantive major general on 3 June 1917, commensurate with his new responsibilities, as a result of "distinguished service in the Field".

Despite a tenacious defence during the 1918 German spring offensive, Major General Heneker's division was overrun at the First Battle of Villers-Bretonneux. Fortunately Sir Thomas William Glasgow's 13th Brigade (Australia), and Harold Elliott's 15th Brigade (Australia), managed to recapture the location on 25 April 1918, and this feat of arms was later described by Lieutenant General Sir John Monash, commander of the Australian Corps, as the turning point of the war.

For his war service, Heneker was made a Companion of the Order of the Bath in January 1918, Commander of the French Legion of Honour in 1918, and a Knight Commander of the Order of the Bath in 1919.

== Post-war ==
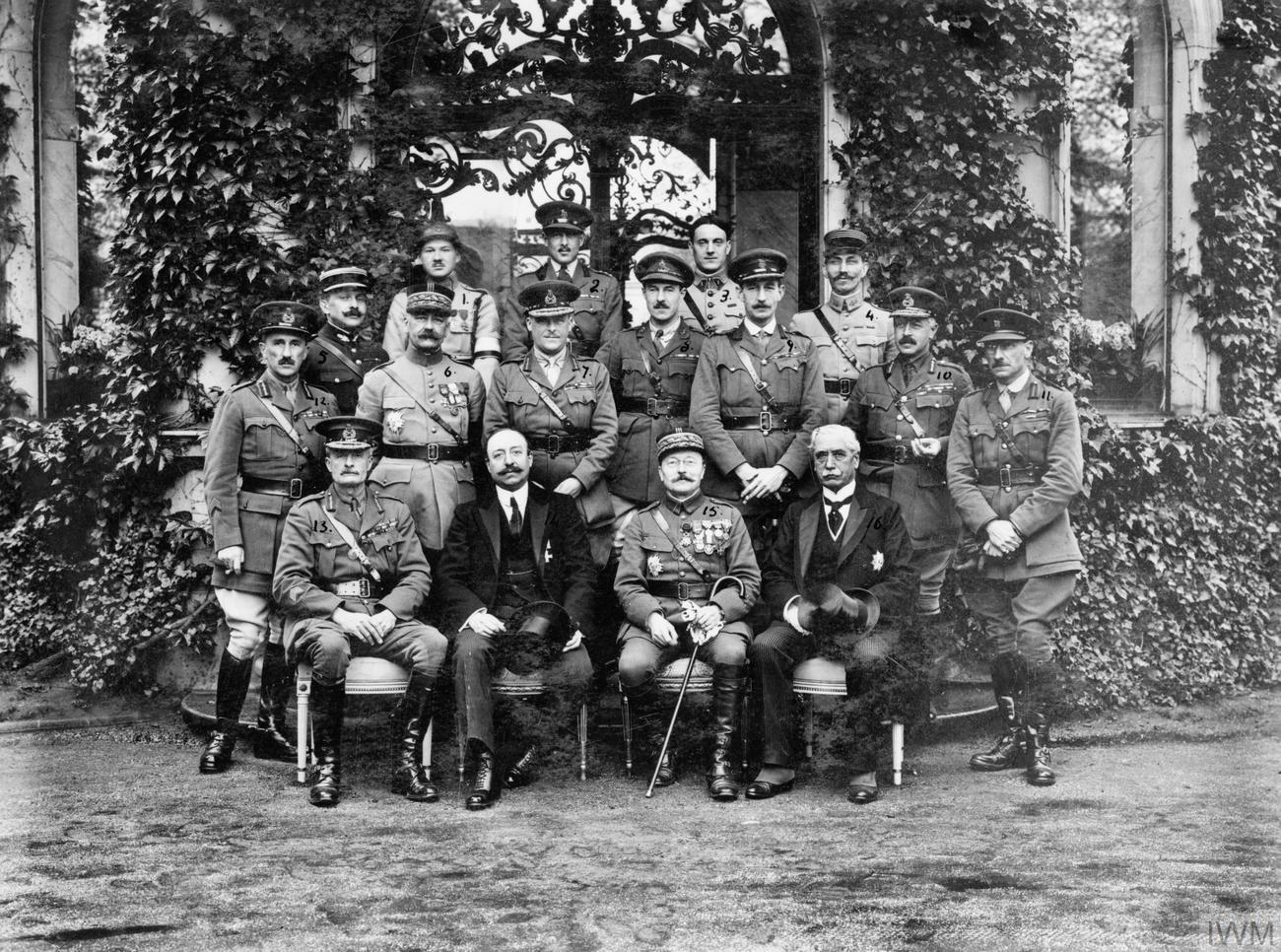
Formal group photograph of British and French officers and commissioners outside the house of the Commander-in-Chief Allied Armies of Occupation, Marienberg, 1919 or 1920. Major General Heneker is stood in the second row on the extreme left, behind Lieutenant General Sir Thomas Morland.

Following the armistice on 11 November 1918, Heneker remained in service with the British Army during the occupation of the Rhineland. His division held a portion of the bridgehead east of Cologne, Germany from March to October 1919, after which he took command of a new formation, the Independent Division, Rhine Army, which he commanded from October 1919 to February 1920. Heneker commanded the Rhine Garrison at Cologne beginning in March 1920.

In 1921, Heneker served as commander of the Inter-Allied Commission of Management in Upper Silesia, stabilizing the borders between Germany and Poland. He gave up this assignment in July 1922. He was then, later that month, made GOC 3rd Division at Salisbury Plain, an appointment he held until 1926. He was promoted to lieutenant general in April that year and in 1928 he returned to India, where he was appointed GOC-in-chief, Southern Command, India.

Heneker was promoted to full general in March 1931. He vacated his appointment as GOC-in-C on 22 March 1932, and was placed on half-pay from the following day before retiring from the army on 16 April 1932.

== Family ==
Heneker married Clara Marion, daughter of E. Jones, of Velindre, Wales, in 1901. The couple had two sons: David William, born 31 March 1906, and Patrick Allason Holden, born 1 September 1908. David Heneker was a composer and lyricist of Charlie Girl. He was nominated for three Tony Awards: in 1961, as one of the authors of the English book and lyrics for Best Musical nominee "Irma la Douce," and in 1965, as Best Composer and Lyricist and for music and lyrics of Best Musical nominee "Half a Sixpence." Patrick Allason Holden was a captain in the 3rd Cavalry of the Indian Army; he died 29 August 1942 as a Prisoner of War on Singapore.

== See also ==
- List of Bishop's College School alumni

== Footnotes ==
Military offices
Preceded by Havelock Hudson	GOC 8th Division; 1916–1919	Division disbanded
Preceded by Robert Whigham	GOC 3rd Division; 1922–1926	Succeeded by John Burnett-Stuart
Preceded by Sir Harold Walker	GOC-in-C, Southern Command, India; 1928–1932	Succeeded by Sir George Jeffreys
