= John Shea (Indian Army officer) =

British officer in the Indian Army (1869–1966)

Sir John Shea GCB KCMG DSO
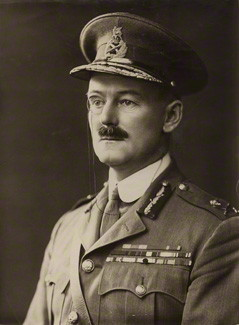
- Shea in 1919
- Born: 17 January 1869; St John's, Newfoundland, Canada
- Died: 1 May 1966 (aged 97); Fulham, London, England
- Military career
- Allegiance: United Kingdom
- Branch: British Army
- Service years: 1888–1932
- Rank: General
- Commands: 151st Brigade; 30th Division; 60th Division; 3rd (Indian) Division; Central Provinces District; Eastern Command, India
- Conflicts: Chitral Expedition; Second Boer War; First World War
- Awards: Knight Grand Cross of the Order of the Bath; Knight Commander of the Order of St Michael and St George; Distinguished Service Order

General Sir John Stuart Mackenzie Shea, GCB, KCMG, DSO (17 January 1869 – 1 May 1966) was a British officer in the Indian Army. During the First World War, he held senior commands on the Western Front and the Middle Eastern theatre.

== Early life and military career ==
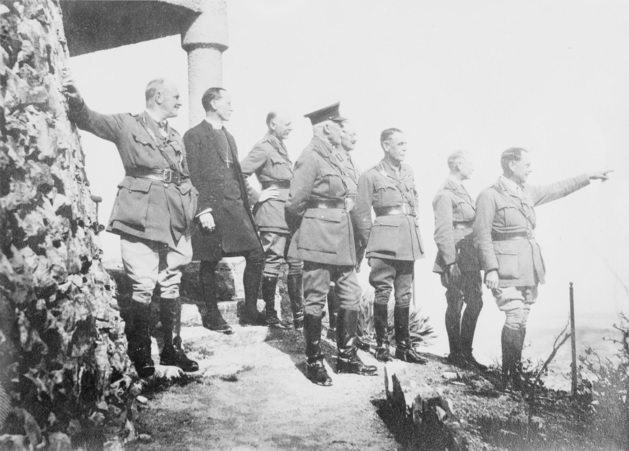
From left to right are, Sir Edmund Allenby, Rennie MacInnes, Malcolm Donald Murray, HRH the Duke of Connaught, Major General J S M Shea, Sir E S Bulfin, General Sir Harry Chauvel, Sir Philip Chetwode (March 19, 1918).

Educated at Sedbergh School and the Royal Military College, Sandhurst, Shea was commissioned into the Royal Irish Regiment as a second lieutenant in February 1888.

He was promoted to lieutenant on 11 February 1890, and the following year transferred to the British Indian Army where he was posted to the 15th Bengal Lancers. He saw action with the Chitral Expedition in 1895, and was promoted to captain on 11 February 1899.

The Second Boer War started in South Africa later the same year, and Shea was awarded the Distinguished Service Order (DSO) for leading 200 South Australians in a night attack on Commandant Jan Smuts's laager. For his service in the latter parts of the war, he received a brevet promotion to major on 22 August 1902. He became an instructor at the Staff College, Quetta, in 1906, the same year he was promoted to major.

He was promoted to brevet lieutenant colonel 10 July 1912 and substantive lieutenant colonel 11 February 1914.

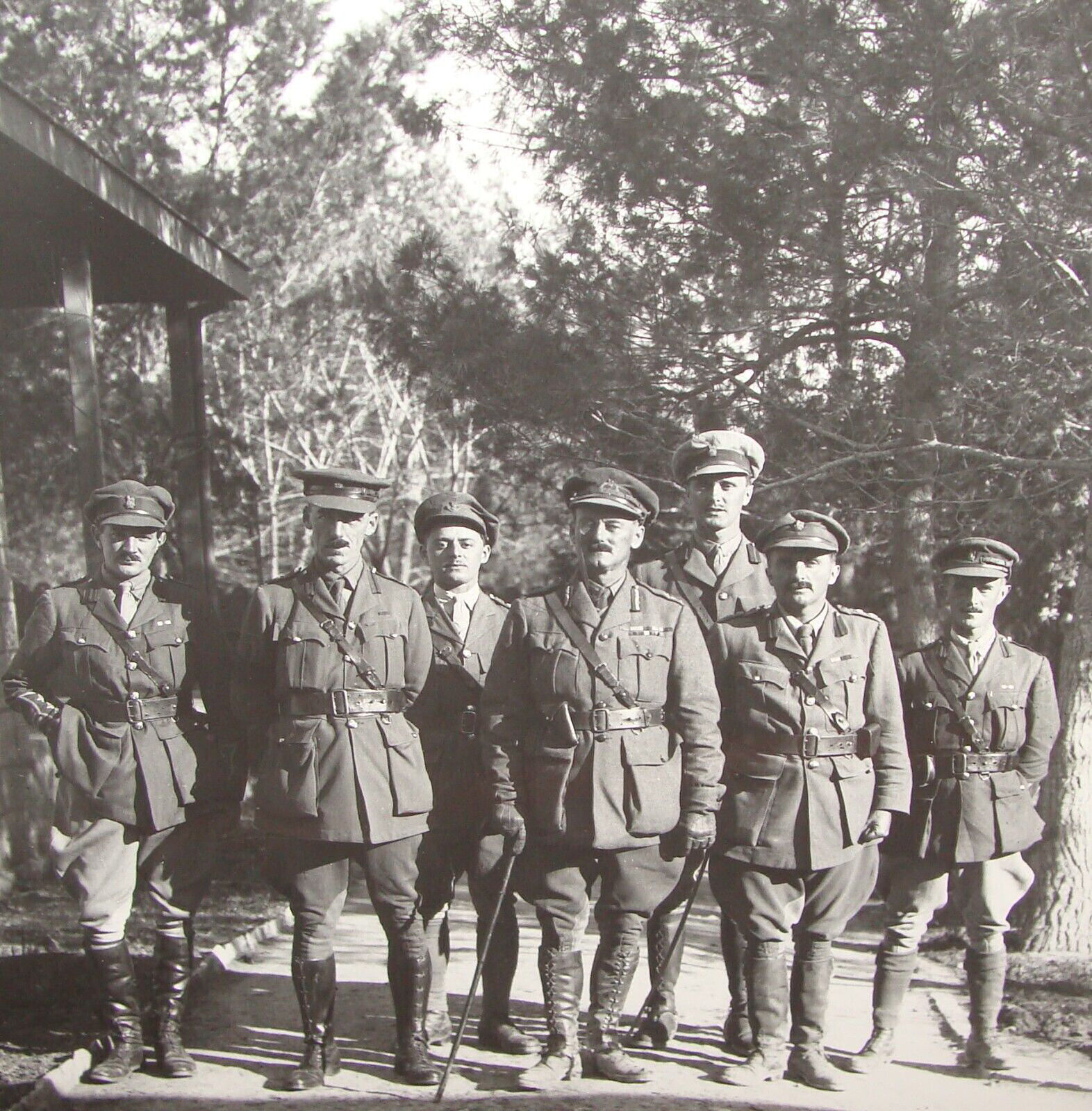
General Shea, with cane, and staff members at the surrender of Jerusalem. (9 December 1917)

== First World War ==
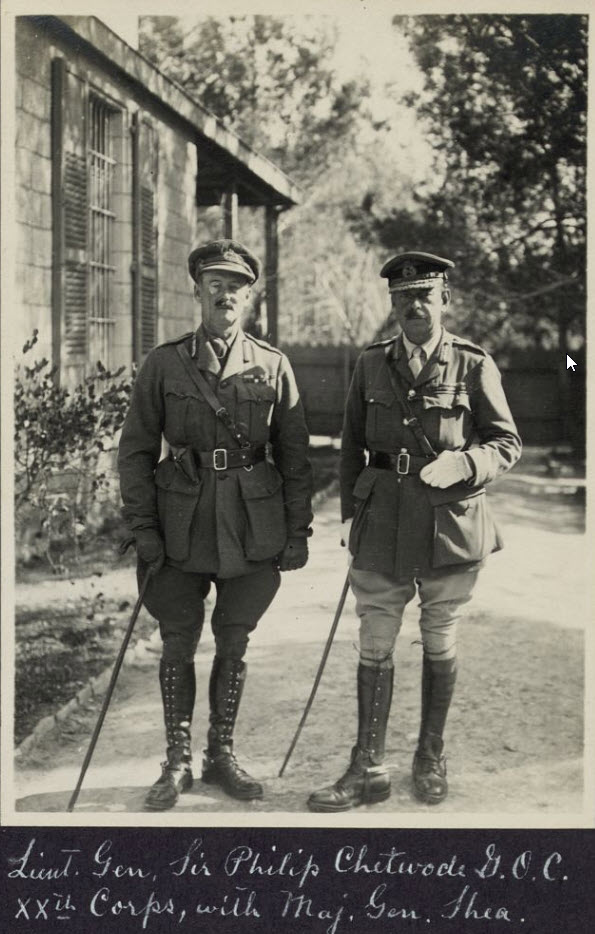
Lieutenant General Philip Chetwode (right), GOC XX Corps, and Major General John Shea, GOC 60th Division, June 1917.

Shea served in the First World War, initially as a General Staff Officer 2nd grade in August 1914 on the staff of the British Expeditionary Force (BEF) and then with the 6th Division when, on 29 December 1914, he succeeded Colonel William Furse as the division's General Staff Officer 1st grade (GSO1), or chief of staff.

In February 1915 he was made a Companion of the Order of the Bath. In July he was promoted to the temporary rank of brigadier general and became commander of the 50th (Northumbrian) Division's 151st (Durham Light Infantry) Brigade, a Territorial Force formation, which had recently arrived on the Western Front.

He was made a brevet colonel in January 1916 and a temporary major general in May and became general officer commanding of the 30th Division, a Kitchener's Army formation, which he led in the Battle of the Somme later that year. After being promoted to substantive major general in March 1917, he led the division at the Battle of Arras.

He became GOC 60th (2/2nd London) Division in Palestine in August 1917. He commanded the division at the Battle of Mughar Ridge in November 1917, at the Battle of Jerusalem in December 1917 and at the First Battle of Amman in March 1918. On 9 December 1917 he received the keys of the city of Jerusalem, an act symbolising its surrender by the mayor Hussein al-Husayni, after many other generals refused to take this responsibility. He was appointed a Knight Commander of the Order of St Michael and St George in the 1919 New Year Honours.

== Post-war and final years ==
After the War he became a corps commander in Palestine in 1918, GOC 3rd (Indian) Division in 1919 and, promoted in January 1921 to lieutenant general, became GOC Central Provinces District in India in 1921. He relinquished this position in January 1923 and was promoted to Knight Commander of the Order of the Bath (KCB) in the 1923 Birthday Honours. He went on to be adjutant general, India in 1924 and, after relinquishing this appointment on 1 April 1928, was General Sir George Barrow's successor as General Officer Commanding-in-Chief, Eastern Command, India in 1928 before retiring from the Indian Army in 1932.

In retirement, he served as the Commissioner for London Boy Scouts from 1936 to 1948.

Military offices
Preceded by Edward Bulfin	GOC 60th (2/2nd London) Division; 1917–1919	Division disbanded
Preceded by Sir George Barrow	Adjutant-General, India; 1924–1928	Succeeded by Sir Robert Cassels
Preceded by Sir George Barrow	GOC-in-C, Eastern Command, India; 1928–1932	Succeeded by Sir Norman MacMullen
