= Adjutant General (India) =

Senior officer of the Indian Army

Adjutant General of the Indian Army
- Flag of a Principal Staff Officer

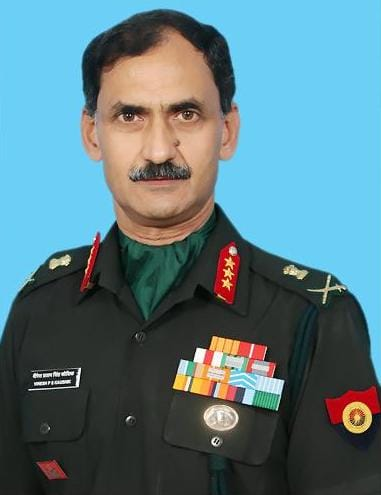
- Incumbent; Lieutenant General V P S Kaushik; PVSM UYSM YSM SM since 2 August 2024
- Indian Army
- Abbreviation: AG
- Reports to: Chief of Army Staff
- Seat: Kashmir House, Rajaji Marg, DHQ PO, New Delhi – 110011
- Appointer: COAS
- Term length: No fixed term length

The Adjutant General of the Indian Army is the senior administration officer who reports to the Chief of Army Staff and is also the Colonel of the Corps of Military Police and Judge Advocate General.

== Role, organisation and function ==
The office of the Adjutant General deals with a wide spectrum of issues relating to Army, which includes manpower planning, human resource policy, recruitment, discipline, matters relating to Judge Advocate General's Department, Provost Marshal Directorate (Corps of Military Police), missing defence personnel, service matters relating to personnel and welfare of serving soldiers.

The Adjutant General's office is organised as follows:

- Director General (Manpower Planning and Personnel Services)
  - Additional Directorate General Manpower
  - Additional Directorate General of Recruiting
  - Additional Directorate General Personnel and Services
- Director General (Discipline, Ceremonial and Welfare)
  - Additional Directorate General (Discipline and Vigilance)
  - Additional Directorate General (Ceremonial and Welfare)
  - Provost Marshal
  - Judge Advocate General's Department
  - Managing Director, Ex-Servicemen Contributory Health Scheme (ECHS)
- Director General Medical Services
- Director General Dental Services
- Army Group Insurance
- Directorate of Indian Army Veterans
  - Policy and Outreach
  - Pension and Entitlements
  - Benefits and Services
  - Career Transition Planning Sections
- Army Welfare Education Society
- Army Welfare Housing Organisation

== Adjutants General prior to Independence ==
Adjutants-General before the independence of India have included:

Rank	Name	Appointment Date	Left office	References
Colonel	Sir Henry George Smith	6 March 1840	7 April 1846	
Colonel	Charles Robert Cureton	7 April 1846	22 November 1848	
Colonel	Armine Simcoe Henry Mountain	2 February 1849	8 February 1854	
Colonel	Frederick Markham	7 April 1854	28 November 1854	
Colonel	Henry Havelock	28 November 1854	30 July 1857	
Colonel	Sir Edward Lugard	31 July 1857	22 October 1858	
Colonel	The Hon. William Lygon Pakenham	22 October 1858	1860	
Colonel	Edmund Haythorne	22 June 1860	Jan 1866	
Colonel	Henry Errington Longden	Jan 1866	Mar 1869	
Major-General	The Hon. Frederic Augustus Thesiger	Mar 1869	Mar 1874	
Major-General	Edwin Beaumont Johnson	Mar 1874	Sep 1874	
Major-General	Sir Peter Stark Lumsden	Sep 1874	Oct 1879	
Major-General	Sir George Richards Greaves	Oct 1879	Nov 1884	
Major-General	Sir Thomas Durand Baker	Nov 1884	Feb 1887	
Major-General	William Kidston Elles	Feb 1887	Oct 1890	
Major-General	William Galbraith	Oct 1890	Apr 1895	
Major-General	Gerald de Courcy Morton	Apr 1895	Nov 1898	
Major-General	Sir William Nicholson	4 Nov 1898	9 Nov 1901	
Major-General	Sir Edmond Elles (acting Adjutant-General)	4 Jan 1900	Apr 1901	
Major-General	Beauchamp Duff (acting Adjutant-General)	Apr 1901	Nov 1901	
Major-General	Horace Smith-Dorrien	9 Nov 1901	Jun 1903	
Major-General	Beauchamp Duff	Jun 1903	Mar 1906	
Major-General	Alfred Martin	Apr 1906	May 1908	
Major-General	Robert Scallon	Jun 1908	Mar 1909	
Lieutenant-General	Sir Arthur Barrett	Apr 1909	Feb 1912	
Major-General	Fenton Aylmer	Mar 1912	Nov 1915	
Major-General	John Walter	Nov 1915	Feb 1917	
Lieutenant-General	Sir Havelock Hudson	Feb 1917	Nov 1920	
Lieutenant-General	Sir Walter Delamain	Nov 1920	Mar 1923	
Lieutenant-General	Sir George Barrow	Mar 1923	Feb 1924	
General	Sir John Shea	Feb 1924	May 1928	
General	Sir Robert Cassels	May 1928	May 1930	
General	Sir Norman MacMullen	May 1930	Apr 1932	
General	Sir Walter Leslie	Apr 1932	Apr 1936	
Lieutenant-General	Sir John Brind	Apr 1936	Oct 1937	
General	Sir Roger Wilson	Oct 1937	Mar 1941	
Lieutenant-General	Brodie Haig	May 1941	Oct 1941	
Lieutenant-General	Sir William Baker	Oct 1941	Mar 1944	
Lieutenant-General	Sir Ralph Deedes	Mar 1944	Mar 1946	
Lieutenant-General	Sir Reginald Savory	Mar 1946	1947	

== Adjutants General after Independence ==
Adjutants-General after independence have included:

Rank	Name	Appointment Date	Left office	Unit of Commission	References
Major General	Hira Lal Atal			16th Light Cavalry	
Major General	S M Shrinagesh	January 1948	August 1948	19th Hyderabad Regiment	
Major General	Jayanto Nath Chaudhuri	January 1952	January 1953	7th Light Cavalry	
Lieutenant General	Kanwar Bahadur Singh		1 October 1959	19th Hyderabad Regiment	
Lieutenant General	P P Kumaramangalam	5 October 1959	30 April 1963	Regiment of Artillery	
Lieutenant General	Kashmir Singh Katoch	1 May 1963	November 1963	East Surrey Regiment	
Lieutenant General	Har Prasad		December 1970	3rd Cavalry	
Lieutenant General	Har Krishen Sibal	December 1970	June 1972	5th Gorkha Rifles (Frontier Force)	
Lieutenant General	Srinivas Kumar Sinha		July 1980	5th Gorkha Rifles ( Frontier Force)	
Lieutenant General	K Balaram		July 1985	Corps of Signals	
Lieutenant General	SK Mazumdar		1988	Bengal Sappers	
Lieutenant General	Manohar Lal Chibber			5th Gorkha Rifles (Frontier Force)	
Lieutenant General	Bhartruhari Trimbak Pandit	1990	March 1992	Corps of Engineers	
Lieutenant General	R V Kulkarni	March 1992	April 1993	Garhwal Rifles	
Lieutenant General	Madan Mohan Lakhera	June 1993	October 1995	Kumaon Regiment	
Lieutenant General	Krishna Mohan Seth	October 1995	31 December 1997	Regiment of Artillery	
Lieutenant General	S S Grewal	1 January 1998	30 April 2002	Jammu and Kashmir Rifles	
Lieutenant General	A Natarajan	1 May 2002	31 January 2004	Regiment of Artillery	
Lieutenant General	Mohinder Singh	3 February 2004	30 October 2005	Punjab Regiment	
Lieutenant General	A S Jamwal	31 October 2005	31 August 2006	Regiment of Artillery	
Lieutenant General	Thomas Mathew	1 September 2006	January 2009	Rajput Regiment	
Lieutenant General	Mukesh Sabharwal	January 2009	2011	Rajput Regiment	
Lieutenant General	Jai Prakash Nehra	2011	May 2013	Madras Regiment	
Lieutenant General	Sanjeev Anand	2013	2014	Mechanised Infantry Regiment	
Lieutenant General	Gurmit Singh	July 2014	2015	Assam Regiment	
Lieutenant General	Rakesh Sharma	2015	March 2017	11th Gorkha Rifles	
Lieutenant General	Ashwani Kumar	2017	31 October 2019	Corps of Army Air Defence	
Lieutenant General	Arvind Dutta	1 January 2020	November 2020	Dogra Regiment	
Lieutenant General	Harsha Gupta	December 2020	March 2022	Sikh Light Infantry	
Lieutenant General	Bansi Ponnappa	April 2022	31 July 2024	Mahar Regiment	
Lieutenant General	VPS Kaushik	3 August 2024	Incumbent	Kumaon Regiment	
