= Corps of Military Police (India) =

Military police of the Indian Army

- Crest of the Corps of Military police
- Active: 1939–present
- Country: India
- Branch: Indian Army
- Size: 9,000 Personnel (approximately)
- Regimental Centre: Bengaluru, Karnataka
- Nickname: Provost
- Motto: Seva Tatha Sahayata
- Anniversaries: 18 October (Corps Raising Day)
- Decorations: • PVSM-1 • AVSM-1 • SC-1 • SM-5 • MMs-1 • MiD-5

Corps of Military Police (CMP) is the military police of the Indian Army. In addition, the CMP is trained to handle prisoners of war such as telephone exchanges. They can be identified by their red berets, white lanyards and belts, and they also wear a black brassard with the letters MP imprinted in red.

The term 'red berets' is synonymous with the personnel of the elite corps of Military Police (CMP), since all ranks of this Corps adorn the exclusive red berets along with white belts to distinguish themselves from other Corps of the Army. The role of this Corps is primarily to assist Army formations in maintaining a high standard of discipline of its troops, prevent breaches of various rules and regulations, and assist in the preservation of high morale of all ranks of the formation.

== History ==
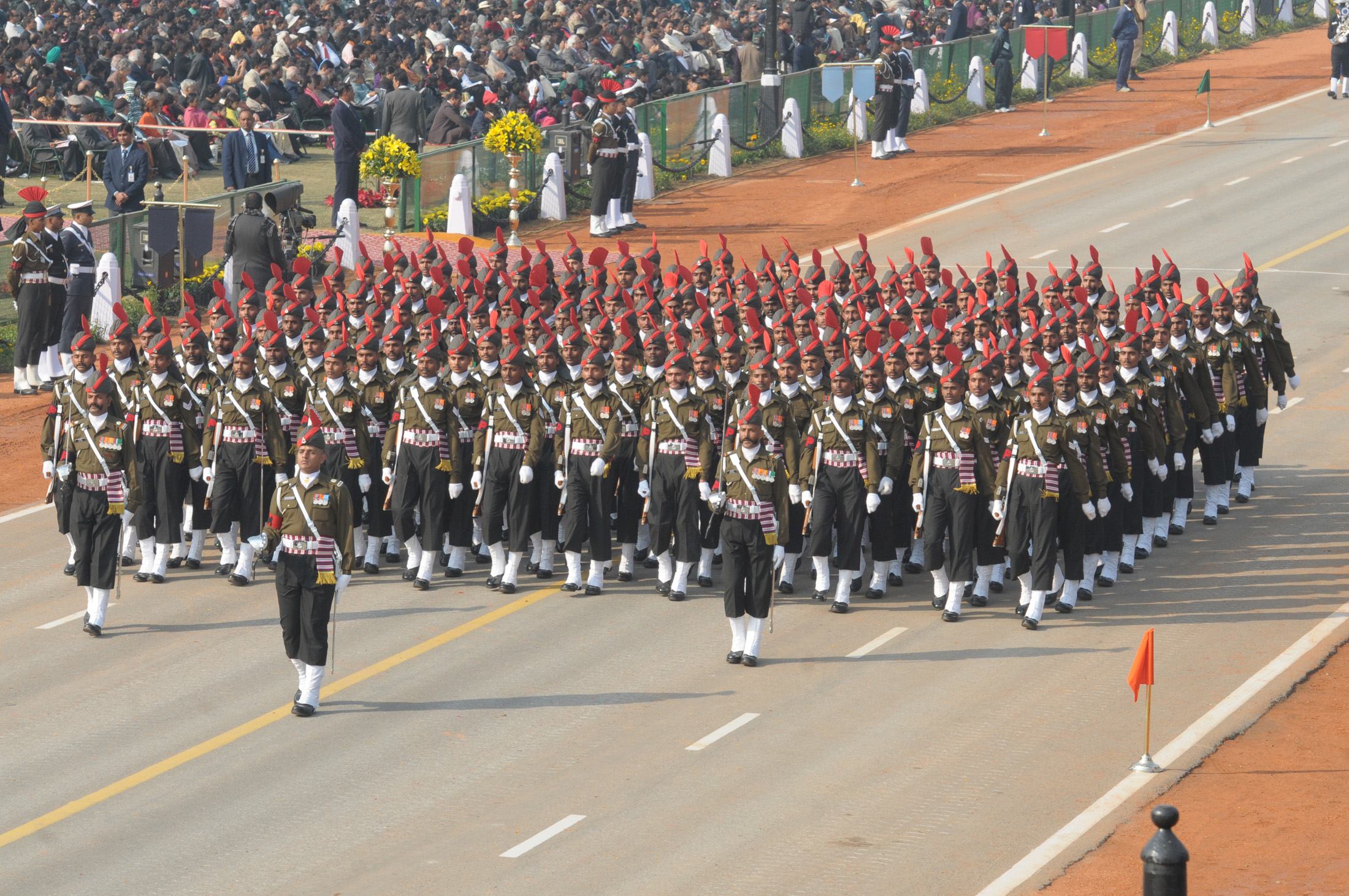
Corps of Military Police marching contingent passes through the Rajpath during the 63rd Republic Day Parade, 2012

The first section of the Indian Corps of Military Police was raised in July 1939, with the name of Force 4 Provost unit and initially was part of the 4th Indian Infantry Division, which was the first Indian formation to be inducted in World War 2. The Provost section was raised by taking soldiers from the 7 and 11th Cavalry Regiment. The recorded date of raising the first Provost Unit is 28 August 1939, and the Unit served in campaigns of North Africa and Burma during the World War 2. After successful operations by this newly formed unit during these campaigns, the Government of British India formally sanctioned the formation of the Corps of Indian Military Police on 7 July 1942.

Initially under the British rule, the Corps was known as 'Corps of Indian Military Police (CIMP)' and after the Freedom of India on 18 October 1947, the corps was re-designated and now is known as 'Corps of Military Police (CMP)', which is now celebrated as Corps Raising Day.

== Roles and Tasks of the Corps of Military Police ==
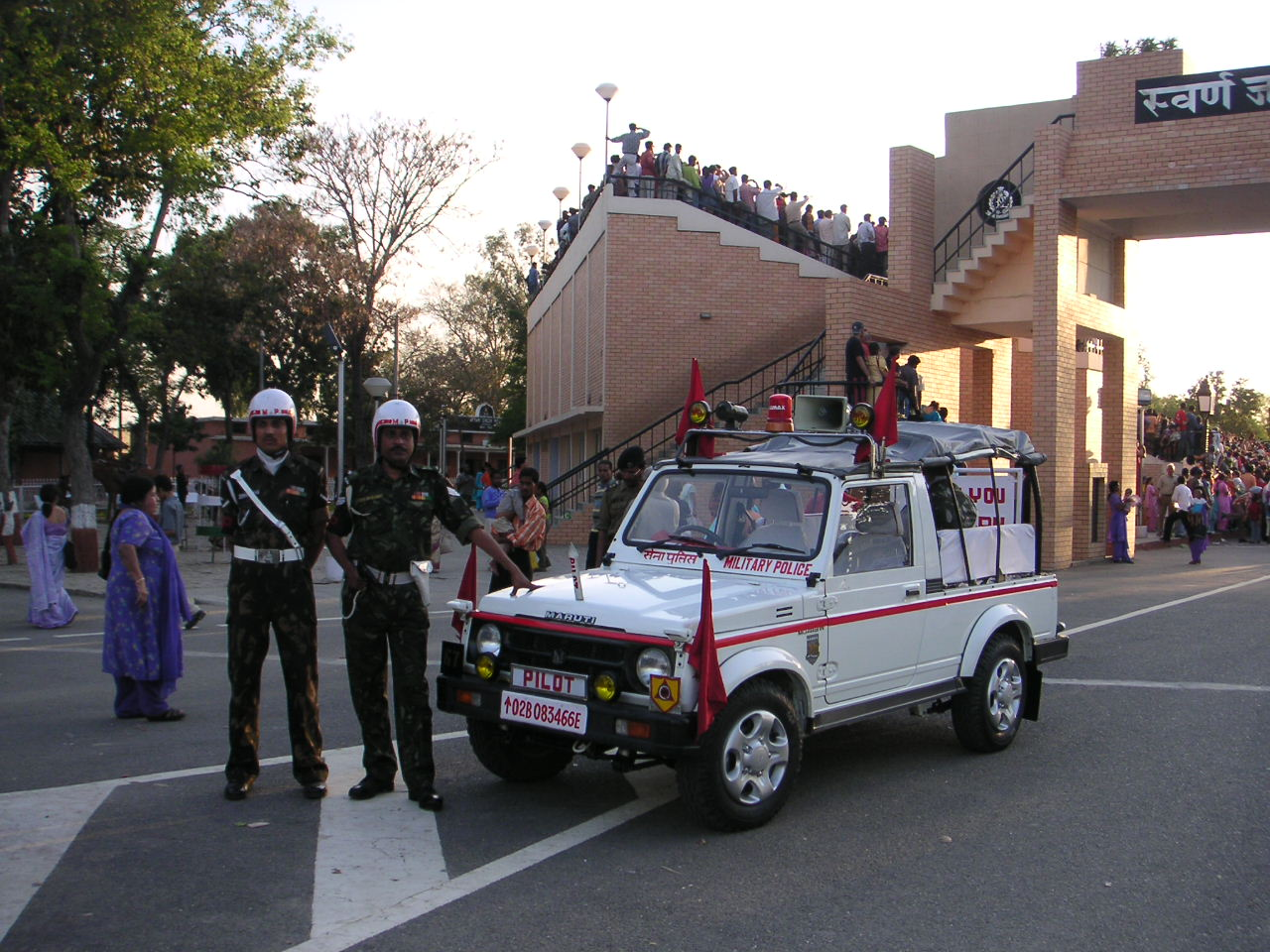
Military Police at the India Pakistan border

- Policing the Cantonments and army establishments
- Maintenance of Order and Discipline in the cantonments, Army Establishments, and to prevent the breach of Rules and Regulations of the Indian Army by the Soldiers serving in the Regular Army.
- Maintaining the movements of logistics, soldiers, and vehicles in the cantonments during both peace and war both times
- Handling POWs
- Controlling stragglers and refugees in war
- Assistance to other regiments, soldiers, and their families
- Aiding civil law enforcement and is responsible for making liaison with the Naval police, and the Air Force police
- Investigating Cases of the Indian Army
- Providing pilot vehicles to Division Commanders, Corps Commanders, Army Commanders, and COAS
- Providing close protection to the Chief of Army Staff

== Band ==
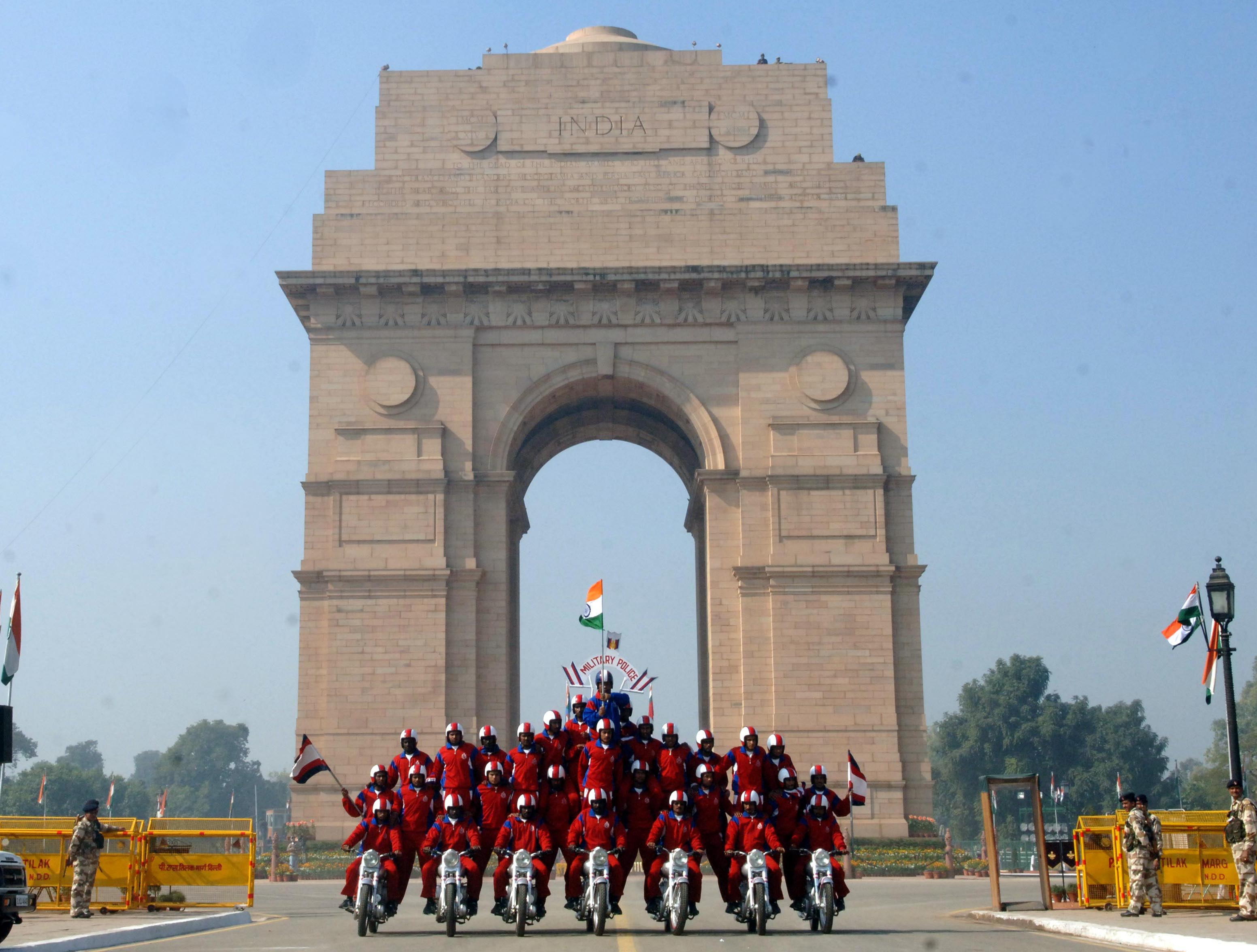
The Dare Devils of Corps of Military Police performing astounding feats on its blazing motorcycles, passing through the Rajpath during the 58th Republic Day Parade, 2007

The CMP Brass Band is the military police's official military band. It was raised in 1953 in Faizabad. In 1966, the band was assigned to privileged duties at the Rashtrapati Bhavan. It received official commendation by the President of India A. P. J. Abdul Kalam in 2003. It was nominated by the army to take part in the tri-services band concert in 1994 at Pune. This band has performed at Amar Jawan Jyoti during 1977, 1988, and 1993. It has participated in the army and the Republic Day parades regularly. It also has the distinction of forming part of the largest military band under one conductor, creating a Guinness world record on 16 December 1997 in New Delhi.

== UN Missions ==
Soldiers of the Corps served in Different UN Mission contingents at Congo, Somalia, Rwanda and Sierra Leone, and are presently deployed in UNIFIL, Lebanon and UNDOF and Golan Heights.
