= Ashwani Kumar (general) =

Adjutant General of Indian Army from 2018 to 2019

Lieutenant General Ashwani Kumar PVSM, AVSM, VSM, ADC

Adjutant General from 2018 to 2019
- In office 27 September 2018 – 31 December 2019
- President: Ram Nath Kovind
- Prime Minister: Narendra Modi
- Preceded by: Arvind Dutta

Personal details
- Born: 17 October 1959 (age 66) New Delhi

Military service
- Allegiance: India
- Branch/service: Indian Army
- Years of service: 39 Years
- Rank: Lieutenant-General
- Awards: Param Vishisht Seva Medal; Ati Vishisht Seva Medal; Vishisht Seva Medal

Lieutenant General Ashwani Kumar, PVSM, AVSM, VSM, ADC (born 17 Oct 1959) is a former general officer in the Indian Army. He retired after 39 years of service and last served as the Adjutant General.

== Early life and education ==
Kumar was born in Allahabad. He did his schooling and graduation from Dehradun. He is a graduate of the Defence Services Staff College (DSSC), Wellington and has attended the Higher Command Course at the Army War College, Mhow at Indore, India. He is also a graduate from prestigious National Defence College and has completed his Ph.D in Spirituality Management in Armed Forces. He has successfully completed Independent Directors Course from MDI Gurgaon, India. He also attended an Air Defence Missile Course in erstwhile USSR.

== Military career ==
Kumar is an alumnus of the Indian Military Academy, Dehradun and was commissioned into the Air Defence Artillery in June 1980. He later commanded a Light Air Defence Regiment, which was actively involved in Operation Parakram. He has the distinction of commanding an infantry Brigade in Western theatre and was the Deputy General Officer Commanding of an active infantry division deployed on Line of Control in Northern Command. He commanded a division and a Corps on the Western front prior to assuming the appointment of Adjutant General in July 2017. Notably, he is the first Army Air Defence Officer to have commanded a Corps and to have become a PSO at Army Headquarters. The officer has successfully tenanted various prestigious staff appointments including Brigade Major of Mountain Brigade in intense insurgency area, MGGS at a Command HQ, ADG DV at AHQ and DG DC & W at AHQ. He has done instructional appointments at Indian Military Academy, Dehradun. School of Arty, Deolali and Defence Service Staff College, Wellington. He was also posted as Military Observer in UNO MIL Liberia. For his distinguished services, he has been awarded VSM in 2015, AVSM in 2017 and PVSM in 2019 and was appointed as Honorary ADC to the President on 1 January 2018.

== Honours and decorations ==

	Param Vishisht Seva Medal	Ati Vishisht Seva Medal	
Vishisht Seva Medal	Special Service Medal		Operation Parakram Medal
Sainya Seva Medal	High Altitude Service Medal	Videsh Seva Medal	50th Anniversary of Independence Medal
30 Years Long Service Medal	20 Years Long Service Medal	9 Years Long Service Medal	MONUSCO

== Dates of rank ==
Insignia	Rank	Component	Date of rank
	Second Lieutenant	Indian Army	07 Jun 1980
	Lieutenant	Indian Army	107 Jun 1982
	Captain	Indian Army	01 Sep 1983
	Major	Indian Army	07 Jun 1991
	Lieutenant-Colonel	Indian Army	05 Mar 1998
	Colonel	Indian Army	03 Oct 2000
	Brigadier	Indian Army	23 May 2008
	Major General	Indian Army	27 Dec 2012
	Lieutenant General	Indian Army	10 Nov 2015
