= Norman MacMullen =

British officer in the British Indian Army

Sir Norman MacMullen KCB CMG CIE DSO
- Born: Cyril Norman MacMullen; 13 December 1877; Delhi, Bengal, British India
- Died: 12 November 1944 (aged 66); Dublin, Ireland
- Military career
- Allegiance: United Kingdom
- Branch: Indian Army
- Service years: 1897–1936
- Rank: General
- Commands: Bareilly Brigade; Rawalpindi District; Eastern Command, India
- Conflicts: Tibet Expedition; World War I; Third Anglo-Afghan War
- Awards: Knight Commander of the Order of the Bath; Companion of the Order of St Michael and St George; Companion of the Order of the Star of India; Distinguished Service Order

General Sir Cyril Norman MacMullen, KCB, CMG, CIE, DSO (13 December 1877 – 12 November 1944) was a British officer in the British Indian Army.

== Early life ==
MacMullen was born in Delhi to Colonel Frederic Wood MacMullen and Mary Eleanora Ward.

== Military career ==
MacMullen was commissioned a second-lieutenant on the unattached list of the Indian Army on 4 August 1897, and served on the North West Frontier in 1897. Promoted to lieutenant on 4 November 1899, he was with the 15th Bengal Infantry in 1900, and then with the Tibet Expedition in 1903.

He saw action in World War I as a General Staff Officer Grade 1 with the 2nd Mounted Division during the Gallipoli campaign and then as Brigadier-General on the General Staff with XV Corps in France. He served as a general staff officer, grade 1 in June 1916.

MacMullen served in the Third Anglo-Afghan War and then became Commander of the Bareilly Brigade in November 1919. He went on to be Deputy Quartermaster-General in India in 1924, General Officer Commanding Rawalpindi District and 2nd Indian Division in March 1927 and was promoted to lieutenant general on 9 June 1929 and became Adjutant-General, India in May 1930. He then became General Officer Commanding-in-Chief Eastern Command in April 1932 before retiring in April 1936.

== Personal life ==
In 1905, he married Maud MacIver-Campbell, daughter of Colonel Aylmer MacIver-Campbell. They had two daughters, Pamela and Margaret.

He died in a nursing home in Dublin in 1944.

Military offices
Preceded by Sir Robert Cassels	Adjutant-General, India; 1930–1932	Succeeded by Sir Walter Leslie
Preceded by Sir John Shea	GOC-in-C, Eastern Command, India; 1932–1936	Succeeded by Sir Douglas Baird

== Sources ==
- Robbins, Simon (2010). British Generalship During the Great War: The Military Career of Sir Henry Horne. Ashgate. ASIN B005QV0EG8.
