= Walter Leslie (Indian Army officer) =

British Indian Army general (1876–1947)

General Sir Walter Leslie KCB KBE CMG DSO
- Born: Walter Stewart Leslie; 23 March 1876; Edinburgh, Scotland
- Died: 9 August 1947 (aged 71); Bournemouth, Dorset, England
- Military career
- Allegiance: United Kingdom
- Branch: British Indian Army
- Rank: General
- Commands: Lahore District
- Conflicts: Siege of Malakand; World War I; Third Anglo-Afghan War
- Awards: Knight Commander of the Order of the Bath; Companion of the Order of St Michael and St George; Companion of the Order of the Star of India; Distinguished Service Order

General Sir Walter Stewart Leslie, KCB, KBE, CMG, DSO (23 March 1876 – 9 August 1947) was a Scottish officer who served in the British Indian Army.

== Early life and education ==
Leslie was born in Edinburgh, the third son of Lieutenant-Colonel Archibald Young Leslie, of Kininvie House, Banffshire, and Alice Louisa Cautley. He was educated at the Royal Military College, Sandhurst.

== Military career ==
Leslie was commissioned into the Royal West Kent Regiment in February 1896 and took part in the Siege of Malakand in July 1897 before transferring to the Indian army and the 40th Pathans in September 1898 and then again to the 31st Punjabis in December 1900.

He served in World War I and then subsequently in the Third Anglo-Afghan War in 1919.

He commanded a column in operations against the Waziris in 1920 and then became Director of Military Operations at Army Headquarters, India in 1923. He was promoted on 14 February 1924 to major general. He went on to be Deputy Adjutant-General and Director of Personal Services in India in 1924, Deputy Quartermaster General in India in 1927 and Commander of Lahore District in 1928. His last appointment was as Adjutant-General, India in 1932 before retiring in 1936.

In retirement, Leslie became colonel of the 2nd battalion the 16th Punjab Regiment.

Military offices
Preceded by Sir Norman MacMullen	Adjutant-General, India; 1932–1936	Succeeded by Sir John Brind
