= History of the British 8th Division during the First World War =

Combat formation of the British Army

8th Division
- Insignia of the Division.
- Active: 1914 - 1919
- Country: United Kingdom
- Branch: British Army
- Type: Infantry
- Size: Division
- Engagements: First World War; Western Front; Battle of Neuve Chapelle; Battle of Aubers Ridge; Battle of the Somme; Battle of Passchendaele; First Battle of the Somme; Third Battle of the Aisne

Commanders
- Notable commanders: Francis J. Davies; Havelock Hudson; William Heneker

The 8th Division was an infantry division of the British Army that was active during the First World War. It was formed in October 1914, consisting mainly of soldiers of the regular army drawn from overseas garrisons of the British Empire. The formation served on the Western Front throughout the war, sustaining a high number of casualties, before being disbanded in 1919. During the conflict, 12 men from the division earned the Victoria Cross. The 8th Division had previously seen action in the Second Boer War. It was reformed in the inter-war period for service in Palestine and had a short history during the Second World War.

== History ==
=== 1914 ===
==== Formation ====
The 8th Division, as with the 7th Division, was a regular army formation composed mostly of regular troops drawn from the garrisons of the Empire after the declaration of War. The division headquarters was set up on 19 September 1914 in the Polygon Hotel in Southampton under Major-General F.J. Davies. Within a week, troops arriving from Malta (Note: 2nd Battalion Middlesex Regiment, 2nd Battalion West Yorkshire Regiment and 2nd Battalion Cameronians (Scottish Rifles)) and Egypt (Note: 2nd Battalion Devonshire Regiment) had been formed up on Baddesley Common as the 23rd Brigade under Brigadier-general F.J. Davis C.B.. On 2 October the division HQ moved to Hursley Park, near Winchester, and by the end of the month the remaining troops had assembled, the 24th Brigade with troops from Egypt, (Note: 2nd Battalion Northamptonshire Regiment and 1st Battalion Worcestershire Regiment)) India (Note: 1st Battalion Sherwood Foresters) and South Africa (Note: 2nd Battalion East Lancashire Regiment) under Brigadier-general F.C. Carter C.B. and the 25th Brigade, under Brigadier-general H.W. Cobham D.S.O., with troops from India, (Note: 2nd Battalion Rifle Brigade and 2nd Battalion Royal Berkshire Regiment) Bermuda (Note: 2nd Battalion Lincolnshire Regiment) and Aden. (Note: 1st Battalion Royal Irish Rifles)

The artillery was composed of the regulars from the V Brigade, Royal Horse Artillery and the XXXIII and XLV Brigades of the Royal Field Artillery. The engineers were also regulars from the 2nd Field Company from Egypt, and 15th Field Company from Gibraltar, where it was the 15th Fortress Company. The mounted troops came from the Territorial Force, the Northamptonshire Yeomanry, as did the Field Ambulance from the Wessex Division, the 1st, 2nd and 3rd Wessex Field Ambulances forming the 23rd, 24th and 25th Field Ambulances. The division Signal Company was also from the Territorial Force.

The division was formed rapidly during the Race to the sea, initially in fine weather, which broke at the end of October, giving the men a mild taste of the muddy conditions at the front. It did not, however, allow the men from hot climates sufficient time to acclimatise, and as a result the sick list during the first winter overseas was "grievously high". The first troops embarked for France from Southampton on 4 November, followed by the rest of the division on the night of 5/6 November.

==== France ====
The division landed at Le Havre and by the evening of 7 November was in temporary rest camps outside of the town. By 9 November the division HQ was installed at Merville, and with the last of the large German assaults in the First Battle of Ypres on 12 November, the 23rd Brigade was placed under orders of the Cavalry Corps, with the 2nd Devons first to go into the front line north of Ploegsteert Wood. On 14 November the 24th and 25th Brigades relieved the 8th and 14th brigades (3rd Division and 5th Division respectively), and like them came under command of the 3rd (Lahore) Division of the Indian Corps, the brigades had been reinforced with territorials from the 5th Black Watch (to the 24th Brigade) and the 13th London Regiment (to the 25th). The 24th and 25th Brigades were positioned opposite the Aubers Ridge, about 10 miles (16 km) south west of the 23rd Brigade; on 15 November these southerly brigades came under heavy bombardment and the division incurred its first casualties. The same day the divisional artillery reached the same area and began supporting its troops, as did the remainder of the division train.

On 16 November the 24th and 25th Brigades came under command of its own division HQ and took over the adjacent lines from the Ferozepore and Jullunder Brigades, and the 23rd Brigade re-joined the division, now on a front of 8,000 yards (4.5 mi; 7.3 km). The division was now part of IV Corps. In the cold and wet of November, the troops of the division, and of all armies on the front, learned to live in the trenches, which were initially of primitive construction, drainage and defensive organisation compared to those that would develop. The men of the division suffered particularly with frost-bitten feet. The first trench raid was carried out on 24 November by the eight men of the 2nd Lincs., who used snow camouflage made from white sheets and ladies night dresses, advanced on a part of the German line, surprised and shot up the garrison that was enfilading part of their own line. Three days later another raid by nine man of the 2nd West Yorks. and a party of Royal Engineers blew up a farmhouse being used by snipers in no-mans land close to the British trenches.

The first planned action by the division took place on 18 December at Neuve-Chapelle, and was at the end of a containing action, in conjunction with the Lahore Division, to prevent reinforcement against the main French attack by the 58th Division south of the la Bassée Canal. Verbal instructions for the attack were received from IV Corps at midnight 17/18 December, and at 04:30, after a 15-minute artillery bombardment, the 2nd Devons and 2nd West Yorks advanced and succeeded in capturing a section of German trench by bayonet and (early, primitive) grenade, although one company of the 2nd West Yorks became caught on the wire, both British and German, and took heavy casualties. Consolidation of the captured line began, but at 07:30 the next day the Germans counterattacked, and with their better designed grenades began bombing the West Yorks, overrunning a platoon, while they were trying to light the fuses of improvised 'jam tin' grenades. Lieutenant Philip Neame of the Royal Engineers found a method of lighting these fuses and while standing on the parapet of the trench threw sufficient numbers of the grenades that the Germans were delayed enough for the remainder of the British and the wounded to get clear. For this action he was awarded the Victoria Cross, the first to men of the division. The trenches gained were abandoned due to flooding later that day; the operation had cost 48 killed and 188 wounded or missing and gained 24 prisoners. The 2nd R.B. had also advanced at the same time and taken a section of the German line further north which was also abandoned when the 23rd brigade withdrew.

A thaw made conditions in the trenches difficult with some sections flooded due to the low-lying ground, and constant repairs being needed. On Christmas Day the troops met with their German opponents in no-mans land exchanged cigarettes, "kicked footballs about" and "lent each other implements for reinforcing each other's wire entanglements". Before the end of the month, with the deteriorating weather, there was 2.5 feet (0.76 m) of water in some trenches.

=== 1915 ===
The wet weather continued with the river Lys bursting its banks and breastworks were constructed on some parts of the line. The flooding reached an extent that the line was held by the minimum number of men with the bulk withdrawn to the rear, and strongpoints were built to cover sectors, in two separate lines to the rear, anticipating the Defence in depth of 1918. Inevitably, Trench foot made its appearance in the division. On 22 February the 4th Battalion Cameron Highlanders joined the 24th Brigade.

==== Neuve Chapelle ====
The village of Neuve Chapelle had been in German hands since immediately before the division's arrival in the area, its still intact houses at the northern end being used by German snipers. Planning by the division had begum for the capture of the village in February, while the ground was still waterlogged, over a short front intending to capture the village from the north. The Army HQ had larger ideas and the attack planned by them included the 7th (Meerut) Division of the Indian Corps and the 7th British Division and an intention to press on to the Aubers Ridge. On the left of the line the Dehra Dun brigade relieved the 23rd Brigade west and south west of the village, on the right the 22nd Brigade relieved the 25th Brigade north of the village, and the 24th Brigade moved to the left west and north west of the village, with the division mounted troops and cyclists. The 23rd and 25th brigades went into the rear to rest, although the 25th supplied work parties for the preparations of the attack. IV Corps had gathered 202 pieces of artillery and a 15 inches (38 cm) naval gun manned by naval officers for the assault, and the Indian Corps a similar number. The engineers created supply dumps and made the flooded front line trenches serviceable for the advancing troops.

8th Division at Neuve Chapelle 10–14 March 1915

On the night of 9–10 March the 23rd and 25th Brigades formed up, with the 25th Brigade to the right (south), the division's southern boundary passed through the northern end of Neuve Chapelle and 900 yards (820 m) to north was the northern divisional boundary. The brigade boundary followed a lane christened "Sign Post Lane" which ran centrally, south of east through the division area. At 07:30 the artillery, trench mortars and machine guns began to fire and at 08:05 the 2nd Royal Berks, 2nd Lincs, 2nd Scottish Rifles and 2nd Middlesex (right to left) began their advance. Except for the left most battalion the German front line trench was gained by 08:30. On the left the artillery support was provided by batteries which had arrived on 9 March directly from Britain, and their suppressing fire was much less effective.

Three times the 2nd Middlesex was beaten back with heavy losses, which lead to the 2nd S.R. having an open flank. As a result, they secured only around 100 yards (91 m) of the right of their objective trench losing 10 officers. On the right, after another 30 minutes of artillery bombardment on Neuve Chapelle itself, the 2nd Rifle Brigade and 1st R. Irish R. passed through the first two battalions. By 09:00 they had reached the road running through and north of the village up to cross roads on Sign Post Lane. Again the rightmost battalion (2nd R.B.) had comparatively slight losses, while the 2nd R.I.R. were more strongly engaged, they captured a chateau to the road north of the village and the road from it leading north, with their left flank facing north.

A new bombardment of this section of the line was called for, while the 2nd Devons. were moved up. The second bombardment was more effective, causing 65 Germans (including an officer) to leave their trenches and surrender to the British. At 10:00 the 24th Brigade began to be deployed with the 2nd East Lancs. moving forward, with the instructions to bridge the gap between the 23rd and 25th brigades at the Sign Post Lane crossroads. the 2nd West Yorks. now reinforced the 2nd Devons. and 2nd S.R. fighting fiercely northwards along the German trenches along their original objective line. By mid day the Germans had been cleared from the trenches between Sign Post Road and Rue Tillerloy, moving into the 7th Division area. Additionally reinforced by 1st Worcs. by 12:30 a line from the orchard to the Moated Grange had been secured. by 13:00 the second objective line had been secured and the troops were digging in, the 4th Cameron Highlanders were assigned the Moated Grange area and the 25th Brigade was in touch with the Bareilly and Garwal Brigades of the 7th Indian Division. The original Division plan had been accomplished, the Army plan was now to be attempted.

The remainder of 24th Brigade was ordered forward at 13:30 and at 15:10, IV Corps ordered an advance on a group of houses about 0.5 miles (0.8 km) east of the orchard (centre right edge of the map to the right). although supported by artillery and flanking fire from 25th Brigade to the south the attack was over open ground crossed with field drainage ditches. The advance, by 1st S.F. (south) and 2nd Northants. (north), was slow and came under heavy German machine gun fire, and was complicated by the presence of units from the 7th Division. The advance came to a halt 300 yards (270 m) from the houses, which the Germans were holding with a prepared position. Here the troops dug in for the night in the rain.

In the early hours of 11 March, the division received orders for another advance against the Aubers Ridge, part of which was about 1 mile (1.6 km) to the east. The bombardment supporting the northern part of the division (24th Brigade) was once again inaccurate, falling beyond the houses that were the previous days target, and today's initial target, allowing the Germans to inflict heavy casualties to the 1st S.F. and 2nd Northants. for no gain. This was repeated in the afternoon when they tried again reinforced by the 1st Worcs.. Communications between the front and brigade headquarters had broken down due to the retaliatory German bombardment, which broke telephone lines as quickly as they could be repaired and made it almost impossible for runners to get through. On the southern front the 23rd Brigade took over the front line with the intention that the 25th aid the advance of the 24th brigade. An attempt the coordinate an attack with the Dehra Dun Brigade to their south came to nothing as the same communication difficulties were experienced as the 24th Brigade, with contact not being made with division headquarters until 15:20 that day. However the attack by the Indian Brigade was unable to make progress and no movement was made. The day ended with little gain and many casualties.

Before daybreak on 12 March the Germans attacked, pushing the 1st S.F. back to their support trenches north of Sign Post Lane. However the Germans were then caught in enfilade by the 2nd West Yorks. to the south and by the right company of the 1st Worcs. to the north, the 1st S.F. then counter-attacked despite their earlier losses and regained their line by 07:15. A more northerly German attack against the 2nd Northants. failed, with that battalion and the 1st Worcs. advancing to capture trenches near the houses that were the target of the previous days attack. The volume of German bombardment of the area was noted to increase during the day. The British plan for an advance remained unchanged, except for a delay, from 10:00 to until 12:00, in the start of the assault and artillery bombardment cause by a thick mist. The bombardment was ineffective, and with communications still disrupted, the 24th Brigade began its assault at the original time, and at 12:00 came under fire from its own artillery. For the rest of the afternoon and evening the 24th and 25th brigades attempted to push forwards, only to be met with strong German artillery and machinegun fire, and when 1st Worcs. and 2nd East Lancs. reached some of the much sought after houses and an orchard to the south of them, they were once again subject to the British artillery shelling them back to their own lines. By now the northern part of the divisions area was intermingled with five units of the 7th Division. The lack of communications with the rear lines resulted in IV Corps believing that the German moral was lower than it was, and so ordered further attacks. The 25th Brigade, 1st R.I.R. and 2nd R.B., attacking at 13:30 made no progress, the 23rd Brigade, 2nd Devons. and 2nd S.R., attacking at 17:15 also made no progress. A second attack was being prepared, when word came of the 7th Division postponing its attack, the 8th Division dug in on the ground it held. The first British deliberately planned offensive of war cost the division 4,834 killed, wounded and missing. On 14 March the 23rd Brigade relieved the 7th Division and extended the division line north to Chapigny.

==== Fromelles ====
8th Division at Aubers Ridge

While at Neuve Chepelle, and in the following weeks, the division was reinforced, the 25th Brigade was joined by the 1/1st London Regiment on 13 March, the 23rd Brigade was joined by the 1/7th Middlesex Regiment on 15 March and on 22 March by the 1/6th Scottish Rifles. Between 23 and 25 March the division moved north east, 3.3 miles (5.3 km) along the Rue Tillerloy, to lines between Laventie on the British side and Fromelles, on the Aubers Ridge, on the German, relieving the 1st Canadian Division. The 4th Cameron Highlanders left the 24th Brigade on 8 April.

From the beginning of April the division began to prepare for the next planned offensive, this was to aid the French offensive at Vimy Ridge, and further British attacks at Neuve Chapelle, the whole of this as an attempt to help the Russians. The Germans became aware of the increased activity and correspondingly increased their artillery bombardment of the area, causing casualties in the front and rear lines. The plan was for the 24th and 25th Brigades to break through the German lines and push south to between Aubers and Fromelles, the 23rd Brigade and a brigade from the 7th Division, following closely behind the assaulting brigades would then advance further south and link up with the Indian Corps south of Aubers. The artillery bombardment started at 05:00 (Note: supplemented by brass mortars dating from 1840.) and was ineffective at keeping the Germans under cover, even at the height of the bombardment.

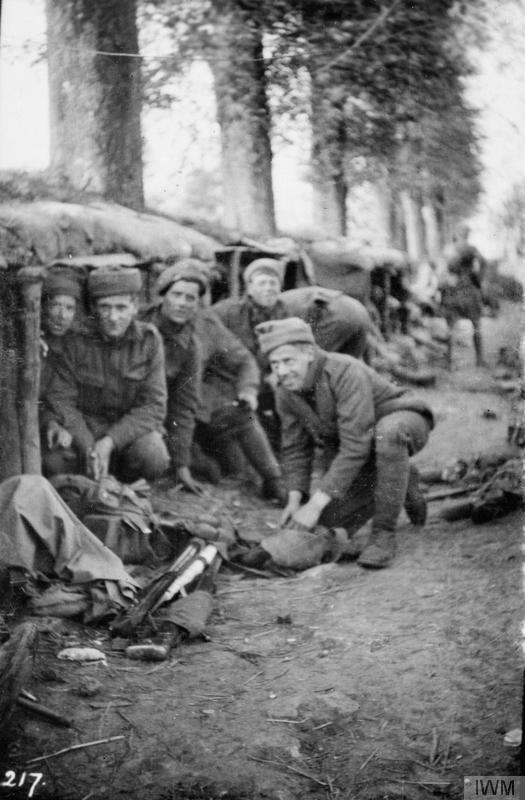
Men of the 2nd Battalion Scottish Rifles, preparing battle kit outside a dugout behind Cellar Farm at 0515 hours on 9 May 1915.

As a result, even while forming up the 2nd East Lancs. were subject to heavy fire and casualties, and were then swept by direct and enfilade fire as they advanced at 05:40, the survivors retired, with difficulty, to the Saily-Fromelles road in no-mans land. Advancing at 06:10 the 1st S.F. had to veer left to avoid the survivors of the 2nd East Lancs. and finding the German wire uncut, were halted. The 2nd Northants. were also faced with enfilade fire and its A company was almost wiped out, D company managed to take a small section of the German line, but became isolated when the supporting companies were stopped in no-mans land. On the 25th Brigade front the 2nd R.B. and 1st R.I.R. not only reached the German line but the Fromelles road some 200 yards (180 m) beyond, but were soon attacked from both flanks and the rear and forced to retire to the German front line with over 50% casualties, including most of their officers. The 13th London, using the cover of two mines blown when the barrage lifted, succeeded in reaching the German line and the Fromelles road, but like the 2nd R.B. and 1st R.I.R. were then forced back by fire from the flanks. By 06:20 all forward movement had ceased and the gains consisted of three short lengths of the German front line held by the assaulting companies.

The 25th Brigade now ordered the remaining two companies of the 2nd Lincs. (Note: The other two, at this time, taking cover in no-mans land after trying to reach the 2nd R.B. and 1st R.I.R. earlier.) to advance using the crater line of the blown mines to effect link up between the 13th London and the rest of 25th Brigade in the German lines. However, they veered of course and failed to link up with any other troops, succeeded only in securing another isolated section of German trench. Numerous attempts were made to reinforce the troops in the German trenches, but they were rendered ineffective either by the German machine gun and rifle fire across no-mans land or steadily reinforced artillery fire directed at the forming up points, only small parties of the 2nd S.R and 2nd R. Berks. being able to reach the German lines due to the former and the 1st Worcs. suffering from the latter in particular. Before nightfall IV Corps ordered 7th Division to renew the assault the next morning, however their unfamiliarity with the trenches and the German bombardment meant that any attack would be delayed and it was abandoned. Early in the morning of 10 May the Germans counter-attacked and by 03:00 they had driven out the remaining British pockets, and returned to the British line. The isolated D company of 1st Northants. had been withdrawn early the previous night. The second planned British offensive action had cost the division 4,490 killed wounded and missing for no gain.

In spite of its losses the division was not taken out of the line, although some of its units were rested in billets around Estaires and Laventie for a few days, but all of the division was back in the line, north of Neuve Chapelle on 15 May. On 20 May the 13th London left the division, as did the 6th Scottish Rifles on 2 June, on 21 June the 8th Middlesex joined 23rd Brigade, merging with the 7th Middlesex. The division was now part of III Corps, and was moved some 2 miles (3.2 km) to the left of its previous position in front of Aubers Ridge. The division was to spend a relatively quiet July and August here, instructing the new 20th (Light) Division in trench warfare. On 27 July the divisional commander, Major General Davies, in command since the war began, left to take over VIII Corps, then at Gallipoli, Major General Havelock Hudson took over on 1 August

==== Bois Grenier ====
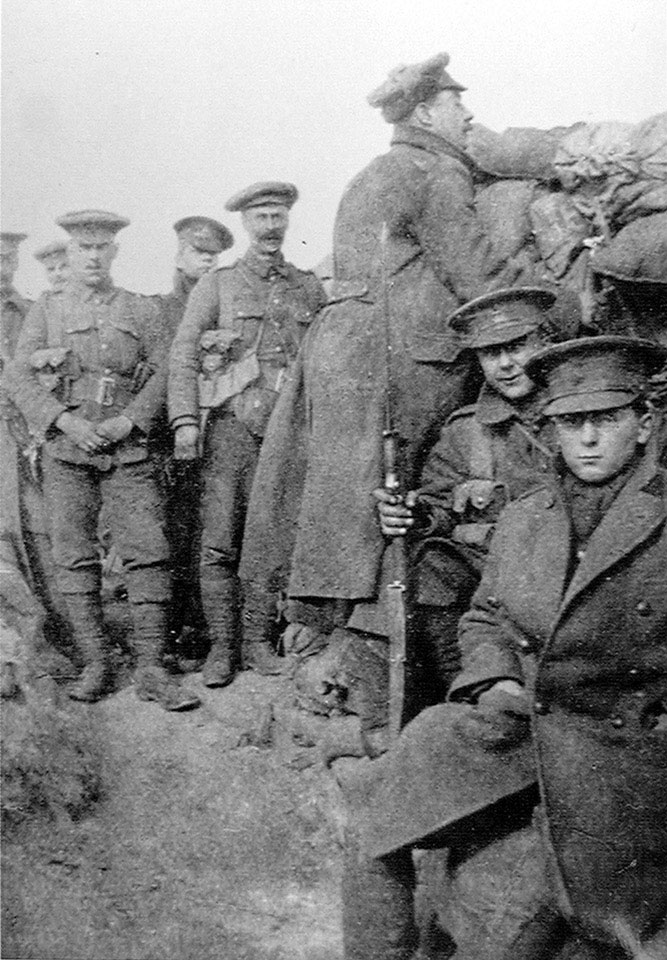
Men of the 2nd Battalion, Royal Berkshire Regiment, in the trenches, 1915.

While the French launched the Third Battle of Artois, the British were to support this with the Battle of Loos. Supplementary to this, on the same day, 25 September, a number of operations were to be made along the British front, at Givenchy, Aubers Ridge, Bellewaarde Ridge and by the 8th Division at Bois Grenier. Here, where the line was approximately 1,600 yd (1,500 m) south east of Bois Grenier, the aim was to capture 1,200 yd (1,100 m) of German trench opposite a re-entrant that bulged inwards into the British line, and link it into the British line; in some places no man's land was only 100 yd (91 m) wide. The 25th Brigade, 2nd R.B. on the right, 2nd R. Berks. in the centre and 2nd Lincs. on the left were to make the assault with 1st R.I.R. holding the trenches to their left and 1/1st London and 1/8th Middlesex in reserve. The 24th Brigade held the trenches to the right and 23rd Brigade was divisional reserve. An artillery bombardment began on 21 September, with the German retaliation becoming stronger from 23 September. At 04:25 the artillery bombardment shifted to the German front and second lines, including six 18-pounders concealed on the front line, using this to creep forwards in no-mans land the attacking companies broke cover at 04:30, with the German lines being entered by all three battalions up to the second line.

The 2nd Lincs. and 2nd R. Berks linked up, but a gap of 200 yd (180 m) remained to the 2nd R.B., this section contained a communication trench to the German rear. By 06:30 the 2nd Lincs. had to retire from the second line due to heavy German counter-attacks, and the supply of grenades running low. The grenade issue was also affecting the other battalions, with 12 different types of grenade then being used at the time, with the troops often forgetting how to use then in the heat of battle. The situation was not helped by the rain, which made lighting those grenades that had fuses that needed to be lit difficult to use properly. In spite of reinforcement from 1st London and grenadier platoons from 24th Brigade, the British were gradually bombed out of the centre and left of the line by 14:00 and despite making a stand and even advancing toward the centre of the attack, being supplied more frequently, the 2nd R.B. and its reinforcements were forced to return to the British line shortly after. The only gain was to push forward the line, filling in the re-entrant and taking 123 prisoners for 1,398 casualties.

The division remained in the line, and on 18 October swapped its 24th Brigade with the 70th Brigade from the 23rd Division. The interchange of units was continued, with the 8th K.O.Y.L.I. and 11th S.F. swapping with the 2nd R.B. and 2nd Lincs. from 25th Brigade, and the battalions being split with two companies from each of the new battalions moving to the other battalions of the brigade to facilitate training and acclimatization. This was considered complete by 9 November when the respective battalions were reassembled and returned to their original brigades. Aside from constant work on the trenches, October and November were relatively quiet, except for an artillery bombardment in which the 8th's artillery joined in, on 20 November. On 24 November after one year and 12 days in the line, the division was for the first time withdrawn as a whole from the line and placed in Army and General Headquarters Reserve. The division was billeted around St. Omer and training was carried out often in wet weather, the division received praise from Field Marshal French for its actions at Bois Grenier.

=== 1916 ===
The Division returned to the front between 9 and 12 January in the Fleubaix sector of III Corps, near Bois Grenier. Here, from 26 January, the division received and trained units from the New Armies, Tyneside Scottish and Irish battalions from the 34th Division as well as infantry, engineers, artillery and the headquarters staff of the 39th Division. Also in January the brigades On 8 February the 1/1st London, 1/7th and 1/8th Middlesex battalions left the division, all joining the 56th (London) Division. The weather continued to be wet and in the low lying Lys valley, flood waters in the trenches was again high. In March the division moved south, the division headquarters opening at Flesselles, north of Amiens on 29 March, as part of the Fourth Army. On 4 April the division relieved the 32nd Division in the la-Boisselle - Thiepval sector. The trenches contrasted with those the division had known being dry, for the most part, and having deep dug-outs, they were however overlooked by German positions. The effects of this were revealed on 11 April when after an artillery bombardment that included Tear gas, the 1st R.I.R. positions were raided and prisoners were taken. (Note: In spite of the increased German artillery activity compared with its previous northern posting, conditions were still relaxed enough for "occasional riding lessons being given surreptitiously in Aveluy Wood to enterprising individuals who had no real right to horses." These conditions were to change.) From 10 May the division posted only one brigade in the front line as preparations were made for a large scale assault, not unnoticed by the Germans who provoked the occasional artillery duel. The brigades when out of the line trained for the coming assault. In the first half of May the divisional artillery was reorganised, with the CXXVIII Howitzer Brigade disbanded into three batteries, 55th, 57th and "D" each with four 4.5" guns, each of these then joining one of the 18-pounder brigades. The Divisional Ammunition Column absorbed the artillery brigade ammunition columns.

==== The Somme ====
The original plan for the Somme offensive called for a 45 miles (72 km) long combined front, with 39 French divisions attacking over 30 miles (48 km), and as many British divisions as available (possibly 25) attacking over the remaining 15 miles (24 km). In the event with the drain of the Verdun battle, the French contribution was much reduced, and the British line was around 10 miles (16 km). The 8th Division was deployed to the central part of the British line, and faced a no-mans land, in most places, over 500 yards (460 m) wide. The 23rd Brigade, on the division's right faced "Mash Valley", over 1,000 yards (910 m) to the German line, and flanked on both sides of it by the strong-points of the villages of la-Boisselle (south) and Ovillers (north) on the spurs of the valley. The 25th Brigade faced the Ovillers strong-point directly and the 70th Brigade's planned advance lay under the view of the Thiepval salient. The preparatory bombardment began on 24 June, and in the event proved neither sufficiently heavy nor focussed to cut the German wire, reach the Germans deep dug-outs or knock out German artillery. At 06:25 on 1 July the final front line bombardment began, assisted by the Stokes mortars of the brigade trench mortar batteries.

===== First Day of the Somme =====
Map of the Battle of the Somme, 1916

On the 23rd Brigade front, the 2nd Middlesex and 2nd Devons left their trenches shortly before the lifting of the barrage and began to crawl towards the German line. They were immediately subject to searching rifle and machine gun fire, taking casualties. At 07:30, zero hour, the barrage lifted to the German second line. The assaulting troops rose and went forwards in waves. Immediately the returning fire increased hugely and casualties rose, and with the collapse of the wave formation, only around 200 of all ranks reached the German first line; this number was halved in an attempt to reach the second line. The 2nd West Yorks. were sent out to consolidate the British gains, but few made it across no-mans land to the German first line. At 09:15 the survivors were forced back out of the trench into shell holes in front of it, where they waited until nightfall before returning to the British line.

The 25th Brigade attacked with the 2nd R. Berks. and the 2nd Lincs., three companies from each in the front line. As the barrage moved on, both were subject to intense rifle machine gun fire from the right, such that only a small party on the left of the 2nd R. Berks. made it to the German first line. These were too few in number and they were forced out by grenades shortly after. More of the 2nd Lincs. reached the German line in spite of fire from Ovillers, and captured about 200 yards (180 m) of it by 08:00. Contact was made with the 70th Brigade to the left, but an attempt to reach the second German line with the reserve company failed. By 09:00 they were forced out by increased enfilade fire and bombing. Falling back to the British lines, at 10:00 only 30 uninjured men could be found of the 2nd Lincs.

The leading battalions of the 70th Brigade were the 8th K.O.Y.L.I and the 8th York and Lancaster. These suffered comparatively few losses, except on their extreme left, which was unable to make progress; the remainder, finding the German wire cut, succeeded in occupying the whole of their intended trench section. The second and third trench lines were also taken, despite increasing German resistance. However at 08:30, the retirement of the centre brigade led the bulk of the K.O.Y.L.I to retire with the 2nd Lincs. back to the British line. (Note: Possibly assisted by some subterfuge by the Germans.) There they were joined by the 9th York and Lancaster, one company of which had already lost 50% of their strength to German bombardment of the British trenches while forming up. This force of 8th K.O.Y.L.I., 9th Y&L and some 2nd Lincs. re-crossed no-mans land and joined with the 8th Y&L in the first and second lines of German trenches. Two companies of the 11th Sherwood Foresters who attempted to cross no-mans land were pinned down by machinegun fire, with the battalion headquarters officers all wounded. This penetration into the German line was gradually pushed back with exposed flanks.

Due to lack of knowledge of the positions of the British troops, it was decided not to order a fresh bombardment of the German lines in an attempt to carry on the attack. Troops remaining in the British lines were also subject to heavy German bombardment and no-mans land was swept by intense fire. During the afternoon the divisional command became doubtful that any part of the German line remained in British hands, and that the assaulting troops who had not returned to the British line were sheltering in no-mans land. By 19:00 the relief of the 8th Division by 12th (Eastern) Division had been ordered. The 8th Division had lost 5,424 killed, wounded and missing.

==== Béthune ====
After being billeted to the west of Albert, the division was entrained and transferred north to I Corps, First Army on 6 July. Here it rested and trained for a week while in billets in the mining area between Brauy and Béthune. On 13 July, the division was re-joined by its 24th Brigade, as the 70th Brigade returned to the 23rd Division. On the night of 14–15 July the division relieved the 39th Division in the Cuinchy sector some 4.5 miles (7.2 km) south east of Neuve Chapelle. The trenches were again of a different nature to those previously encountered by the division, a maze of new, disused and remnant trenches, and fortified mine craters left over from the many battles fought by the French since December 1914 in the area. Many unburied and partly buried bodies remained in the area, and digging a new trench was described as "a task gruesome in the extreme", one recently captured trench having its parapet reveted with sand-bag covered corpses. Some observation posts were only 20 yards (18 m) from the Germans. Initially with just one brigade in the line, on 22 July, with the removal of the 15th (Scottish) Division, the division extended south west to cover the Hohenzollern Redoubt area, now with two brigades in the trenches. With more divisions being used on the Somme, a reorganization of I Corps front in August saw the divisions line shifted south to cover Hulluch, now with all three brigades in the line.

Trench warfare was maintained, with many trench raids being carried out, mortaring, now with the Stokes mortar and 2-inch mortars being available, and sniping, the twisting nature of the lines offering opportunities for enfilade fire. On 10 September the division's Chief of Staff, Lt Col. Hill was killed by a sniper. Mining was also carried out, with five mines being blown in one day on one occasion (3 British, 2 German). On 12 October the division handed over its sectors to the 21st and 40th Divisions.

==== The Somme ====
On 20 October the division headquarters opened at Bernafay Wood. By this time the part of the line where the division had previously failed to gain ground was now alongside the southerly British advances. The weather had turned poor and movement at and behind the front line was difficult, if not impossible. The division was now part of XIV Corps

===== Le Transloy =====
8th Division at Le Transloy, gains on 23 October 1916

On the night of 19–20 October, the 24th and 25th Brigades relieved two brigades of the 6th Division north of Lesbœufs and east of Gueudencourt, some 1.25 miles (2.01 km) west of Le Transloy. Co-ordinating with a French Sixth Army attack towards Sailly-Saillisel (2.25 miles (3.62 km) south east of Le Transloy) the XIV Corps was to attack toward Le Transloy on 23 October. On 21 October the 23rd Brigade took over a portion of the 4th Division line on the right, all of the division's brigades were in the line. The division had arrived in the line with the preparatory bombardment in progress, now the actual advance was to be covered by a creeping barrage moving at only 50 yards (46 m) yards a minute, to enable the infantry to keep up due to the wet ground conditions. Due to fog, zero hour was 14:30.

On the right, the 23rd Brigade attacking with the 2nd S.R. and 2nd Middlesex gained its objectives, a line between 100 yards (91 m) and 150 yards (140 m) beyond the German front line trench, by 15:45 and held off "weak" counterattacks. In the centre, 25th Brigade's 2nd Lincs. were unable to keep up with even the slow rolling barrage due to the state of the ground, and found their objective trench held in great numbers by Germans who had attempted to escape the preliminary bombardment in front of 23rd Brigade, only to find their route blocked. Encouraged visibly by an officer, the German troops stood close packed above the parapet and poured rifle fire on the advancing first wave of Lincolns. The second wave was also subject to machine gun fire from the direction of Le Transloy. Only a small section of trench to the immediate left of 23rd Brigade was occupied. The 2nd R.B. were checked on their right by the same troops as the 2nd Lincolns., and only the left section of their objective, a length of shell holes 130 yards (120 m) long was taken. Attempts to link up with the 23rd Brigade by attacking south into the German trench were repulsed. On the division's extreme left, 24th Brigade, the 2nd East Lancs., having almost not learned of the change in zero hour, occupied the first of their limited objectives after keeping close behind the creeping barrage. Attempts to take the second objective were made difficult by it being on a reverse slope and eventually the isolated companies were withdrawn to the captured line. Large numbers of German grenades were captured, which helped defend the trench against their former owners when they counter-attacked.

At 18:30 the right of the 2nd S.R. were forced from a length of trench by Germans artillery, but German troops massing for a counter-attack in a nearby sunken lane were bombarded in turn by British artillery. An attack by the 25th Brigade's reserve battalions to gain the centre of the line was ordered and the bombardment begun, but due to the steady rain through the night, and despite moving off before zero hour of 03:50, the troops were stopped after 70 yards (64 m) with heavy casualties. The weather became wetter, and further attacks were postponed. During the nights of 29/30 and 30/31 October the division was relieved by the 17th (Northern) Division.

After a weeks rest the division returned to the line, relieving the 33rd Division in front of Lesbœufs, the 17th (Northern) Division on its left and the French 18th Division on its right. With the 25th Brigade in reserve it was discovered that due to the state of the ground a relief moving up to the front line could take seven hours to reach it, arriving in an exhausted state and potentially having lost men to stray shot and shell in the darkness. Due to the lack of landmarks, even the guides got lost. While here, the division mostly consolidated the trenches and on 14 November added its artillery to that of XIV Corps for a diversionary attack with a creeping barrage. On the nights of 16/17 and 17/18 November the division, less the artillery, left the line with the promise of a month's rest.

Now part of XV Corps, the division was billeted in the villages around 16 miles (26 km) west of Amiens. Proper opportunity was now given to assimilate and train the new drafts from the hard year just experienced, the first day of the Somme, then stretched thin near Lens, and then back to minor advances on the Somme. Many of the divisional and brigade command staff were replaced, "worn out by the strain and responsibility passing the limits of human endurance" and Major-General William Heneker took command of the division on 10 December. On the nights of 29/30 and 30/31 December the division took over from 4th Division a former French part of the Somme battlefield between Bouchavenses and Saillisel.

=== 1917 ===
The front line now occupied was made of a series of unconnected posts with little wire in front of them, the ground was in such a "swampy" state that attempts to dig proper trenches collapsed even with revetment. Communication trenches were almost non-existent, and reliefs had to be conducted in the open. Support and reserve lines were slight improvements on this. The division began a series of improvements to condition of these lines, and in spite of their short stay, 25th Brigade was relieved on 3 January by 20th (Light) Division and 23rd Brigade relieved on 10 January by the Guards Division, received commendation and thanks from the commanders of XIV Corps and the Guards Division for the improvements. After two weeks out of the line, training, the division returned to the line from 26 to 28 January, immediately to the north of its previous location, relieving the 40th Division. The weather was now frosty and the ground hard. The division was relieved on 10–11 February, with a view to training for what the British believed was an immanent German withdrawal to prepared positions.

==== Advance to the Hindenburg Line ====
===== Bouchevesnes =====
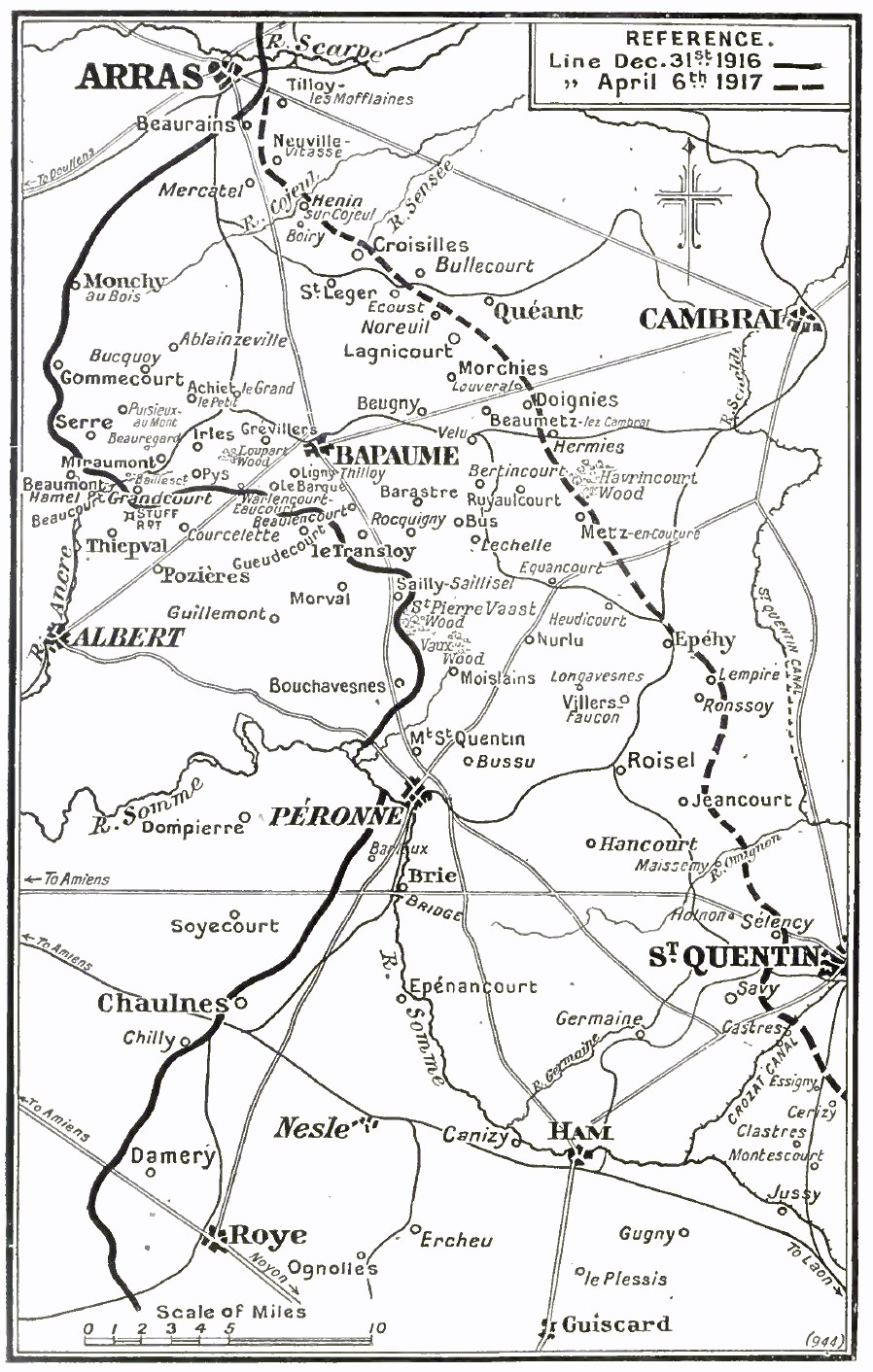
German retirement to the Hindenburg Line, March, 1917

The division returned to the line just east of Bouchavesnes on 21 February, by which time a thaw, followed by rain, had returned the ground to the condition the division had encountered at the end of the previous year. The attack, originally scheduled for 27 February was put back to 4 March. The objective was a ridge line which allowed the Germans observation over the British rear areas, the capture of which would then allow the British observation of the German rear areas. A section of German trenches 1,100 yards (1,000 m) long was to be taken intact, which meant no preliminary bombardment on them; wire, strongpoints and certain trench junctions were targeted. The state of the British trenches meant that the attacking troops were drawn up in the early hours of 4 March in posts in front of the line and along tapes placed in the open behind them. (Note: "A novel experiment was the issue of to the assault troops of chewing gum which seemed not only to stop the men from coughing as they waited shivering on the tapes, but also to give them something to distract their minds.")

On the left, on a short frontage the 25th Brigade's 2nd R.Berks., on the left 24th Brigade, with 1st Worcs. and 2nd Northants. At 05:20, following a rolling barrage, the first trench line was quickly taken with few losses. The only struggle at the second line occurred in a triangular section of trenches on the right of the attack. Troops from the mopping up battalions consolidated the gained trenches and several counter-attacks, launched or planned, were beaten off by infantry or artillery during the remainder of the day, due in part to the observation gained over the German rear areas. The retaliatory German bombardment, from the forming up lines to the new front line, caused most of the British casualties, this continued overnight. This supported a German counterattack that temporarily regained some of the trenches in the early hours of 5 March. (Note: The instructions issued for the attack were considered of such quality, that when the U.S. joined the war, the division was called upon to send copies of them to the US Staff training College.) The division received congratulations for this assault from the Fourth Army Commander, General Sir Henry Rawlinson.

===== Advance in the Open =====
On 7–8 March the 23rd Brigade moved into the line on the northern flank of the division, relieving 121st Brigade of the 40th Division. The discovery, by the patrols of the Fifth Army on the night of 12/13 March, that the trenches opposite them had been abandoned, was followed by the 8th Division's patrols finding the trenches east of Bouchevesnes becoming emptied. By 18 March the Canal du Nord had been reached, 1.5 miles (2.4 km) to 2.5 miles (4.0 km) from the division's line on 8 March. On 20 March the 23rd Brigade became the advance outpost line for the whole division front, with 25th Brigade in support. By 23 March German resistance at Aizecourt-le-Bas, 6 miles (9.7 km) east of Bouchevesnes, showed that the division was getting too close for the German's comfort in their retreat, however the village was taken by the 2nd Devons. On 24 March the division front was joined by the Canadian Cavalry Brigade, acting not only as an advanced screen for the infantry, but actively removing the Germans from a number of positions and capturing Equancourt 7 miles (11 km) north west of Bouchevesnes, handing it on to 25th Brigade who had taken over from the 2nd Guards Brigade in the sector. The Canadians repeated the action with the villages of Liéramont and Guyencourt on 27 March, the day the 2nd Lincolns repulsed a German counter-attack at Equancourt. The division was now running into the German rear-guard, and villages were becoming increasing strongly held.

Reconnaissance had shown the villages of Fins, Sorel-le-Grand and Heudicourt strongly held by the Germans. The villages lay in a north west to south east line, 2.5 miles (4.0 km) long, in a basin, on the far rim of which lay the village of Revlon, 3.5 miles (5.6 km) away. At dawn on 30 March, the 2nd R.B. rushed Fins and drove the Germans out, as did the 1st R.I.R. at Sorel-le-Grand. At 16:00, supported by the divisions artillery, an artillery brigade from 40th Division and by the flanking divisions, 20th (Light) Division to the north and 48th (South Midland) Division to the south, the 2nd R.B. advance on to the ridge and occupied Dessart Wood. As soon as this occurred 1st R.I.R advanced and took the ridge to the south east. At 16:30 the cavalry (Note: Now from XV Corps, the Canadians had left the previous day.) advanced at the southern end of the basin, together with the 2nd Devons. and the 2nd Middlesex, who were both keeping close to the rolling barrage, captured Heudicourt, and then pushed out to the ridge. By 19:00 all of the objectives had been captured, in one day the division had advanced 6,000 yards (3.4 mi; 5.5 km) over a front of 3 miles (4.8 km) for the cost of 12 killed and 56 wounded.

The pressure was to be maintained on the Germans so that they could not reinforce the main British effort at Arras in early April. On 12 April an evening advance by two battalions of the 23rd and 24th Brigades captured Gouzeaucourt in the north of the divisions sector some 2.5 miles (4.0 km) from the ridge occupied on 30 March. After a repulse due to thick wire at Villers Guislian the 23rd Brigade captured that village on 18 April, and three days later Gonnelieu, which overlooked the division's line was captured by the 25th Brigade after harder fighting with the aid of rolling and standing barrages, and wire cutting operations on the previous nights. Simultaneously the 23rd Brigade advanced its outposts, and on 17 April mounted a large raid against Vacquerie, consisting of the 2nd Middlesex, 2nd S.R. and a company from the 2nd West Yorks., launched on a dark night, with rain driven into the faces of the troops, it achieved only partial success for the cost of 191 casualties. After a relatively quiet period, the division left the line on 15 May and transferred into XV Corps reserve. Two weeks later the division was ordered north.

==== Ypres ====
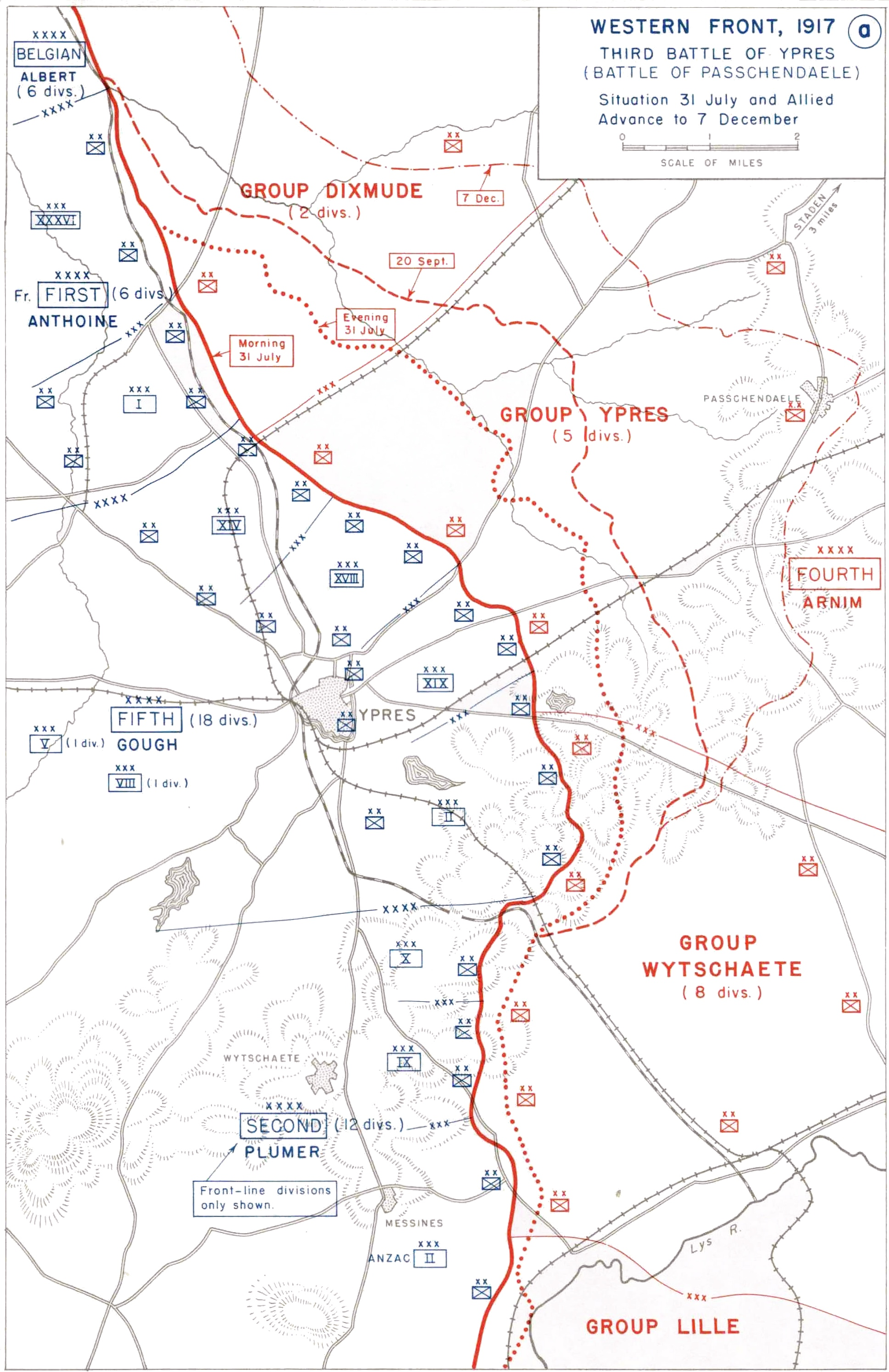
Third Battle of Ypres - overview, 8th Division directly west of Ypres

The division was billeted in the Merris area (5 miles (8.0 km) east of Hazebrouck on 4 June, and was already factored in to the plans for the offensive to capture the ridge around Ypres. The set piece battles having already begun with the attack on the Messines part of the ridge, as part of a plan to keep the Germans from attacking the French after their army mutinies. On 11 June the division transferred to II Corps, part of Fifth Army and by 15 June had moved into the line, relieving parts of the 30th and 55th (West Lancashire) Divisions, on the Menin road at Hooge. The division placed only one brigade in the line at a time, and their nightly reliefs and the working parties preparing for the attack numbering some 2,000 men each night, suffered from the German artillery, the ground being overlooked by German observers.

On 19 June, after constant shelling, the division headquarters moved further back, and on 12 July the division artillery and rear areas were shelled with mustard gas. On the night of 9/10 July the division was relieved by the 25th Division, except for a company and a platoon of the 2nd R.B., who mounted a trench raid, in order to identify the German units in front of them, half of the men had not seen action before, and the raid achieved its objectives, killing an estimated 70-80 Germans for a cost of 9 killed or missing and 31 wounded, some by keeping close to the covering rolling barrage.

After ten days training on mock-ups of the German trench system they were to attack, the division moved back into line on 23 July, with 23rd Brigade in the trenches. The 30th Division was to the division's right and 15th (Scottish) Division of XIX Corps to the left. Trench raids were carried out, one by the 2nd West Yorks. took 5 prisoners, another by 2nd Devons. found the German front line unoccupied. The artillery supporting the attack on the division's front alone consisted of the division's own two brigades, those of the 25th Division, an army field brigade, and a heavy counter-battery group of four brigades with 6-inch, 8-inch, 9.2-inch, 12-inch, 15-inch, 60-pound howitzers, and 13 batteries of 2-inch, 6-inch and 9.45-inch trench mortars. German artillery was also active with a continuous counter-bombardment, causing casualties.

===== Menin Road =====
8th Division on the Menin road ridge, Ypres, 31 July 1917

On an approximate north–south line, across the Menin Road, just under 2.5 miles (4.0 km) from Ypres, the plan for the division was to advance across two phase lines, blue, at 1,400 yards (1,300 m), black, at 2,300 yards (1.3 mi; 2.1 km), to a third, green, at 3,700 yards (3,400 m) from the original front. The ground was broken by the remains of woods and by Bellwaarde lake and its ridge. Two battalions of the 23rd Brigade (on the left) and 24th Brigade (right), each supported by a section of four tanks, were to take the blue line, then the remaining two from each brigade advance to the black line, then the 25th brigade with 12 tanks attached was to take the green line.

At 03:50, under cover of a rolling barrage (advancing 100 yards (91 m) every four minutes) and advancing using compass bearings, the 1st Worcs., 2nd West Yorks. and 2nd Devons. reached the blue line with relatively little opposition. The 2nd Northants. faced the Bellewaarde lake and then the ridge in behind it, coupled with the difficulties of forming up in this even wetter area, were in danger of falling behind the barrage after passing around the lake. Capt. Colyer-Fergussen collected 10 men and rushed forward under the barrage to the German trench on the ridge, here they fought off a German attempt to retake the trench in company strength. Seeing the advancing British under a machine gun attack, the Captain and two men rushed and captured it and turned it on more Germans. They then captured a second machine gun, but were now able to consolidate the position with the arrival of the remainder of their company. Captain Colyer-Fergussen earned the V.C., but was killed shortly after. Before 05:30 the blue line was secured by both brigades.

The follow on battalions of the 23rd and 24th brigades had followed the blue line battalions, and with a new barrage causing the Germans to retire, set off at 05:29. The 2nd Middlesex on the left reached the black line at 05:41, and established a line of posts beyond it by 05:45. Advancing at the same time as the 2nd Middlesex, the 2nd S.R. experienced some opposition from machine guns from the right flank and snipers, but these were overcome by Lewis gunners and rifle-grenade sections. They faced stiffer opposition from houses on the Westhoek ridge and from the north of Westhoek, it was not until 09:00 that the battalion was established over the ridge on the black line. The 1st S.F. also faced opposition from strongpoints in front of Westhoek and machine gun fire from high ground on the right but achieved their place on the black line. The 2nd E.L. on the right of the division's attack faced even heavier machine gun fire from the right and even the reverse, forcing then to place Lewis gun section on their right flank. It later became known that the 30th Division had not kept pace with the advance, and that the 8th Division's right flank was therefore open, with Germans holding the Glencourse Wood heights in strength.

The three battalions of the 25th Brigade, 2nd R.B., 1st R.I.R. and 2nd Lincs. (left to right), were therefore subject to enfilade fire when they advanced, as it was learned of the situation too late to stop the last of the planned attacks. The 2nd R.B. being furthest from the Germans managed to reach Hanbeek Wood, still under fire from the right, all the officers of the right company became casualties, ant they lost touch with the 1st R.I.R.. In the centre the 1st R.I.R. came under "withering" fire, but reached the Hanbeek, with small numbers crossing it. Being unsupported on either flank and with the Germans counter-attacking and even working around their right flank, they were compelled to retire until they had regained contact on their flanks. The 2nd Lincs. came under the heaviest fire of the advance and were forced to dig in on the reverse slope of the Westhoek ridge, just west of the black line, the position the other two battalions were forced back to.

The Germans began local counter-attacks before noon, but these were driven off, as were heavier attacks at 14:00, in which the valley between the blue and black lines was bombarded by German artillery. By nightfall the front west of the black line was held by the three assaulting battalions, two companies of the 2nd R. Berks. at either end of the line and the 2nd Middlesex joining the 2nd R.B and 1st R.I.R., they were joined by dismounted Lewis gunners from the tanks, which had been able to make no progress in the wet shell holes of the area. The division was thus the link between the 15th (Scottish) Division, which had also reached the grblack line and the 30th Division which had only gained the blue line. A heavy rain began in the afternoon, which continued for four days reducing the battle field to a sea of mud. The division was relieved by the 25th Division on the nights of 31 July and 1 August, having lost 3,165 casualties on the day of the battle and another 1,625 in the weeks preceding it. (Note: This included two Lt. Colonels dead and six wounded from the attacking battalions, or three quarters of the infantry battalions' commanding officers. The artillery had more casualties in its time at Ypres than in the whole of its time in France from 1914.)

Billeted around the Steevnvoorde area, the division trained, while absorbing 2,261 officer and other ranks replacements. The purpose of the training was notified to the division on 2 August, that as soon as the remainder of the black line had been taken, the division was to return to its previous area and take part in a general attack on the green line. While out of the line the division area was attacked by German aircraft on 10 August, causing 75 casualties to infantry and engineers.

The division returned to the black line between Westhoek and the Ypres-Roulers railway on the nights of 12/13 and 13/14 August, relieving the 25th Division. To the left of the division, over the railway line, was the 16th (Irish) Division, part of XIX Corps, and to the right the 56th (1/1st London) Division. The weather had continued to be wet and the battlefield was in an even worse condition then when the division had left it previously, and the Hanbeek, which had been crossed briefly on 31 July, was now a "formidable obstacle" and would need the portable bridges which had been prepared. General Heneker had informed II Corps that in order for any advance to the green line to succeed the high ground on the right flank must be taken. The 25th Brigade on the right, had the 2nd R. Berks. in contact with the 56th Division and had the 1st R.I.R. to their left, the 23rd Brigade had as its attacking battalions, the 2nd Middlesex on the right and the 2nd West Yorks. on the left, in contact with the 16th Division. The remaining battalions were either on the old black line or further back. The 24th Brigade had the 2nd East Lancs. and 2nd Northants. on the field, with the others in reserve.

The attack began at 04:45 on 16 August, with a rolling barrage, and the valley west of the Hanbeek quickly occupied, the 2nd R.Bks. taking 50 prisoners and the 2nd West Yorks. finding still hot machine guns in Hanbeek Wood, with their crews killed by the artillery. With portable bridges placed by parties of the 22nd D.L.I., the advance continued over the Hanbeek and up the other side of the valley. Pillboxes in the valley and Hanbeek Wood were dealt with by specialist parties as the main advance passed by them. By 05:00 the flanking battalions began to experience increased machine gun fire from their exposed flanks, from the north from Potsdam redoubt, for the 2nd Middlesex, and from the south from Nonne Bosschen and Polygon Woods, for the 2nd R.Bks., it was becoming clear that the divisions on either side were encountering resistance. The central battalions, experiencing less of this fire, advanced up the other side of the valley and, after hard fighting, were able to take Zonnebeke and Iron Cross redoubts and Anzac ridge between them. The central part of 8th Division's advance was now some 1,000 yards (910 m) ahead of the divisions either side of it.

By 07:00 the first small, frontal, counter-attacks had been beaten off, but by 08:00 the attacks were heavier and coming from the flanks, Zonnebeke Redoubt was attacked from three sides, and attacks from the division's right flank were in danger of cutting off the troops of the advance. German attacks increased in strength, and after forcing the 1st R.I.R. to fall back down the west side of the ridge, and later the 2nd West Yorks. to follow them, at 09:30 launched a coordinated attack across the division's front and flanks. The arrival of German reinforcements was visible to forward observers, but aircraft were unable to fly due to the low cloud, which also interfered with the signals sent by the infantry (Verey lights) for artillery support. Already weakened by the earlier attacks, despite being reinforced with two companies from the 2nd Lincs. and all from the 2nd R.B. on the right and in the centre, the division was forced off the ridge, back down to the line of the Hanbeek or a small distance in front of it. By 14:35 another attack could be seen developing, and once again the signals for artillery support were not seen. The Germans advance in small parties, using shell holes and first attacking available flanks and then the centre, in this way methodically pushing the brigade back to the foot of the Westhoek ridge. The 25th Brigade Headquarters personnel were put into the line as reinforcements due to their steadily falling troop numbers. (Note: The Brigade Signalling Officer, kept tabs by pocketing the used cartridges with which he scored his "hits".) The right of the division's line, the 2nd R.Bks., was reinforced with two companies from the 2nd Northants., which allowed contact to be made with 56th Division and the rest of the division, and released the Brigade HQ staff to their normal duties.

A much larger German attack was seen to develop later in the afternoon, large enough to force the depleted brigade back over the Westhoek ridge, however the artillery was now able to be contacted and together with the division's massed machine gun companies, the attack against both brigades was broken up with heavy losses to the Germans. The 23rd Brigade, with its open right flank was now forced to retire in line with the 25th Brigade at the foot of the Westhoek ridge, later that evening the order was given to retire back to a position of approximately the black line. The battalions which had fought during the day were relieved during the night, the 1st R.I.R. had a strength of one officer and 60 men, with a few more collected that night. After a quiet day, 17 August, with both side collecting wounded, the division was relieved on the night of 18–19 August by the 47th Division. The division had casualties of 103 officers and 2,419 other ranks, for no gain, had taken over 300 prisoners, its men winning, in the battles on the ridge, two V.C.s, nine D.S.O.s, 54 M.C.s and nine bars, 52 D.C.M.s and 198 M.M.s and nine bars. The division was moved to the Caestre area, 13 miles (21 km) south west of Ypres, when inspected by Sir Douglas Haig, the parade numbered 3,950 all ranks. During the rest and training that followed, 1,293 drafts were assimilated. On 23 August the division was transferred to II ANZAC Corps.

===== Passchendaele =====
The division moved south to the Warneton area, 7 miles (11 km) south east of Ypres, recently taken in the Battle of Messines, on a line extending 7,000 yards (4.0 mi; 6.4 km) north from the river Lys at Armentières. Between 25 and 27 August the division relieved brigades of the New Zealand Division and the 4th Australian Division. The division then transferred to VIII Corps, when II ANZAC Corps moved north. The area was relatively quiet and allowed the training of the newly absorbed drafts. On several nights in September the division area was used to launch gas attacks using Livens projectors, and the division made a demonstration on 20 September at the same time as the Battle of the Menin Road Ridge began, with artillery, machine guns and smoke. Dummies were also raised at zero hour and attracted much machine-gun fire. This new assault captured the ground that the division had twice fought over. The normal trench warfare activities of patrolling, raiding, mortaring and artillery exchanges were carried out for the remainder of the divisions time in this sector, with 980 casualties incurred by the time of the divisions relief by 3rd Australian Division beginning on 9 November. (Note: Equating to 12–13 men killed, wounded or missing, a day in a "quiet" section of the line, morale was nevertheless much improved by the recreational activities while units were out of the line)

Map showing the 8th Division’s preparations, dated 28 November 1917 (Passchendaele Museum Collection)

The division's artillery had already marched to Ypres and come under command of the Canadian Corps, the rest of the division completed its relief by 14 November and moved to south east of Hazebrouck. By 17 November the 25th Brigade had relieved the 7th Canadian Brigade north of Passchendaele, and the next day the rest of the division relieved the remainder of the 3rd Canadian Division, with brigade and battalion headquarters being housed in capture pill-boxes. The front occupied by the division was wide enough for one brigade, and it was the intention of the British that the Germans not think that the battle was drawing to a close and that the final part of the ridge around Ypres be taken. As a result of this the German artillery was particularly active and occasionally became a concentrated barrage.

Raiding was particularly active, with the German placement of small parties in shell holes as the posts in front of the line, allowing the opportunity to take prisoners for identification. The division was informed it was due to be relieved in early December and that before that it was to take part in an operation, together with the 32nd and 33rd Divisions, that was intended to capture the last part of the ridge to the north of Passchendaele. The 33rd Division to the south, facing east, was to only demonstrate against the Germans. The 32nd Division to the west, facing north, was given the major part of the operation to take the ridge line and give observation into the valleys leading up to the ridge. The 8th Division, on the corner with only its northernmost troops facing north, the remainder facing east, was to advance to just over the ridge in front of it.

On the night of 30 November the 25th Brigade took over the front line. The plan was to surprise the Germans by not using an initial artillery bombardment, instead beginning it eight minutes after zero hour, set for 01:55 on 2 December, so that the German counter barrage would fall on ground already vacated by British troops. Concerns were raised by the division commander that, due to the bright moonlight, three nights past full, the artillery should start earlier were not taken up due to objections from 32nd Division, whose artillery barrage was already having to be fired in enfilade, given the orientation of the front. The battalions attacking were the 2nd R. Bks. in the south, centre, the 2nd Lincs. and in the north the 2nd R.B., they were to form up behind the outpost line, held by one of their companies. The company of the 2nd Lincs. detailed for this task was reduced to 20 men, being caught in a German barrage while moving up, and its place was taken by a company of the 1st R.I.R. remaining in place. A company from the 2nd W. Yorks. replaced it in reserve.

8th Division, Passchendaele ridge 1–2 December 1917

On advancing at 01:55 the troops on the left (2nd R.B.) were met almost immediately by machine gun fire and by 02:00 intense rifle and machine gun fire was being directed against the whole advance. Coloured flares sent by the Germans indicated artillery was to follow, which it did one minute after the British began their barrage. The German barrage caught some of the British supporting companies still moving through the front lines, caused by the delay due to the initial heavy German fire. On the right, C and D companies on the right of the 2nd R. Bks. reached the objective line with C company just south of the South Redoubt taking 30 prisoners. No. 5 platoon of B company entered the redoubt and engaged the Germans with grenades and bayonet, incurring casualties. The remainder of B company had veered to their left to keep in touch with the right of the 2nd Lincs. and so a gap opened up in the line, leaving 5 Platoon unsupported, and after losing its commander, it was forced out, digging in to the south west. This movement, in turn, exposed the left of D company, but they repelled the small attacks launched by the Germans. Those B company platoons on the left succeeded in a portion of the trench line connecting the two redoubts, capturing three machine guns, and despite being isolated, dug in. They were where the 2nd Lincs. right flank was supposed to be.

The 2nd Lincs. had been subjected to heavy machine gun fire and had lost all of their officers, managed to take the German outpost line, but the heavy fire caused them to dig in some 30 yards (27 m) short of the German trench line. To their left the 2nd R.B., as well as being subject to fire from the front were also enfiladed by machineguns at Teal Cottage, which the 32nd Division was to have captured prior to the attack. As a result, the 2nd R.B. lost 10 out of 12 officers and 50% of their effectives, and were forced to dig in 100 yards (91 m) from their starting line. The line remained in place, until, at 16:10 under an increasing German barrage, a German counter-attack on the 8th Division front was broken up by artillery, at 17:00 the isolated platoons of the 2nd R. Bks. were withdrawn to form a continuous front. That night the brigade was relieved by the 41st Brigade of 14th (Light) Division. Only a small part of the objective was taken, and the gains of the 32nd Division were taken back by the Germans in the afternoon counter-attack. The division had taken 2,630 casualties of which 40 officers and 584 other ranks were killed. The Division was moved to the Wizernes area, and for the next three weeks, trained and rested. The division returned to the same section of the line north of Passchendaele on 27 December, with the 24th Brigade in the line in snow and frosty conditions.

=== 1918–1919 ===
The division remained in the line until 19 January, during which time its main enemy, aside from German artillery and aircraft, was the weather. Alternating periods of thaw and freeze created intense discomfort and a storm on 15 January washed away many of the duckboard routes across the mud during a relief of the 23rd Brigade, leading to an arduous trek back to camp, leaving "all ranks in a state of complete exhaustion". Headquarters, from the font line battalion HQs in captured pill boxes to the division HQ located on a canal bank were flooded to various degrees. The division was relieved by the 29th Division.

==== Reorganisation ====
While billeted around Steenvoorde, the division, in line with all British divisions on the Western Front, was reduced from four infantry battalions per brigade to three, as the result of manpower shortages, caused in part by the British government's reluctance to send new recruits to be "wasted" on the Western Front. Being a regular division composed of regular infantry battalions, none of the removed battalions would be disbanded, merely transferred. The 2nd S.R. transferred from the 23rd Brigade to the 20th (Light) Division, the 2nd Lincs. transferred from the 25th Brigade to the 21st Division, also from the 25th Brigade the 1st R.I.R. transferred to the 36th (Irish) Division. The 2nd East Lancs. moved from 24th to 25th Brigade. This was completed by 3 February. Two battalions were used as work details for defences in the Army Battle Zone, an area of extended defence in depth, beyond the normal system of trench lines, in preparation behind the front. On 12 February the division once more took its place in the line north of Passchendaele, relieving the 29th Division. On the night of 3 March a party from the 2nd Middlesex raided Teal Cottage and killed or captured its garrison. On 8 March the division once again swapped places with the 29th Division and went into billets around Steenvoorde.

==== The First Battles of the Somme, 1918 ====
Map of German Somme offensive 1918

It had been known since the Russian ceasefire that the Germans would use the troops freed from the Eastern Front to launch an attack on the West. Preparations were begun for a defence in depth but were incomplete by the time of the first assault. The training of the division included the beginning of extended order tactics, but this was not completed before the division was ordered to move. On 13 March the division was placed in General Headquarters reserve near the railway junction of St. Omer 28 miles (45 km) west of Ypres, and preparations made by the division staff for further movement, by train, of the division. At 09:00 on the day of the German attack, 21 March, the division was put on five hours notice to move south, and at 18:00 orders were received to move south by train to Nesle 17.5 miles (28.2 km) south west of Saint Quentin as part of XIX Corps. On the evening of 22 March, the division began to detrain at Nesle, Chaulnes and Rosières, with orders to take up a support line 5 miles (8.0 km) east of the Somme. However a reconnaissance by the division commander, Gen. Heneker, convinced the Corps commander to change the orders for the division, and for them to take up positions on the west bank. In the confusion, a billeting party from the 24th Brigade had been ordered to look for accommodation in the village of Atheies, 2.5 miles (4.0 km) east of the Somme, arriving on the night of 22–23 March, they had to fight their way out shortly afterwards.

The division's units were sent to the line as they arrived, relieving the 50th (Northumbrian) Division but had no time to properly reconnoitre their areas. (Note: The 150th Brigade was placed under orders of the 8th Division in the morning of 24 March.) The division was given a line 15,000 yards (14,000 m) in length along the river, two and a half times as long as the normal division line, from just east of Nesle, north to Eterpigny 2.75 miles (4.43 km) south of Péronne. The 24th Brigade took up their position on the centre of this line early on 23 March, the 23rd Brigade to the north by the afternoon and the 25th in the south not until nightfall. By 13:00 that day the first of the British infantry that had already been in combat crossed through the division line, the artillery and other transport had already crossed, 66th (2nd East Lancashire) and 39th divisions to the north and to the south, the 24th Division. By 16:00 the rear-guards had passed over the bridges and they were blown up, however some remained passable to infantry, but a number of tanks had to be destroyed on the far bank. The Germans arrived on the east bank before nightfall and began attempts to cross the river, but these were held, sometimes just as the troops of the division arrived on the scene.

Even before the division arrived however, the Fifth Army's fright flank had been turned on 22 March, by the Germans to the south at Tergnier 18.5 miles (29.8 km) south east of Nesle and they had crossed the Somme at Ham 7.25 miles (11.67 km) to the east in the morning of 23 March. With the right flank now coming under attack, at dawn on 24 March, crossings were made by the Germans in front of 25th Brigade, and all the brigade reserves were committed. By 10:00 the 2nd R.B., on the brigade's northern flank, was in danger of being encircled, cutting them off from the adjoining 24th Brigade, and the rest of 25th Brigade. By 14:15 the brigade had been pushed back 2.5 miles (4.0 km) and by the afternoon had been reinforced by an R.E. field company, the 490th, and half of the divisional reserve, two companies of the 22nd D.L.I., contact was re-established with the 20th (Light) Division of XVIII Corps to the south. The retirement of the 25th Brigade had caused the 24th Brigade to create and then extend a southern flank. By 17:00 when the infantry attacks died down, the brigade's right flank consisted of 1st Worcs. and two companies of the 2nd Northants., with the remainder of the brigade still on the Somme. The 23rd Brigade defended their line on the canal all day, with a battalion from the 150th Brigade plugging a gap in the northern flank.

With the northern flank still protected, for now, by the westward turn of the Somme, the southern flank was essentially open. To remedy this, plans were made to recapture the west bank of the Somme with attacks to by made by the French, in the south, 24th Division in the centre and the 25th and 24th Brigades of 8th Division in the north. (Note: The 151st Brigade, 6th and 8th D.L.I., was placed under orders of the 24th Brigade at 08:00 25 March, leaving the 149th Brigade and detached battalions under 50th Division control.) To facilitate this the troops who had linked up with the 20th (Light) Division were pulled back. However at daybreak on 25 March, the French asked for a delay in the start of the plan, three hours later it was discovered that the French divisions had not received the orders. By 09:00 the gap was filled by the Germans, who continued north and west, together with an attack on the 24th Brigade, which forced its right flank back, the 25th Brigade was now threatened on both flanks. Both brigades were forced back, by midday the remains of the 25th Brigade, 3-400 men that could be collected, were at Omiécourt 4.75 miles (7.64 km) west of the Somme, and were placed under command of a Major of the 22nd D.L.I., and formed a reserve behind the 17th Brigade (24th Division) at Chaulnes 1.75 miles (2.82 km) further west.

The withdrawal of the right and centre of 24th Brigade left the 1st S.F. at the end of the line at St Christ bridge, on the Somme, with the rest of the brigade 2.5 miles (4.0 km) to the south west at Marchélepot. At 16:00 it withdrew under orders, but had to fight through Germans in the village of Misery. At 08:00 the 23rd Brigade was flanked from the north by the Germans, with C Company of 2nd Middlesex being surrounded, only 10 men led by Capt Toye managed to break out, the rest killed or captured. By 18:45 the rest of the battalion, had retired from the river, with only one platoon of B and D companies managing to do so, the trenches of battalion commander being occupied three minutes after they were evacuated. When the 2nd Devons. were ordered to retire that evening they found that they had to fight through small parties of Germans in their rear. That afternoon the decision had been made to retire the division to a line between Chaulnes and Estrées, some 4.25 miles (6.84 km) long between 4 miles (6.4 km) and 6 miles (9.7 km) west of the river. This was achieved that night. The 24th Division was to the south and the 50th (Northumbrian) Division to the north.

By 06:00 on 26 March the division held the line with the 24th Brigade on the right with (south to north) the 6th D.L.I., 2nd Northants., 1st Worcs., a composite battalion, some 650 strong, formed from the remains of the 150th Brigade, 8th D.L.I. and 1st S.F in reserve, and the 23rd Brigade with its three battalions in the line to the south and an R.E. field company as infantry reserve. The remnant 25th Brigade was the division reserve, with all brigade headquarters established at the west end of Rosières. The Germans launched one attack early in the morning, but it was driven off. At 10:00 orders were received for a retirement to a line 5 miles (8.0 km) eastward between Méharcourt and Rosières, due to developments in other parts of the line. The retirement began in the north with 50th Division, and proceeded south, covered by the 25th Brigade. 22 D.L.I. and artillery east of Lihons. By 16:00 the 23rd and 24th Brigades, reinforced by absorbing the 20th Entrenching battalion, were in their new line with no interference by the Germans other than artillery, the covering force retiring at 17:30. The new Commander in Chief, Generalissimo Foch issued an order that evening that the line currently held would be maintained at all costs until French reinforcements could arrive.

At 08:00 27 March the Germans attacked along the whole of the division line, after two waves were repulsed, succeeded in temporarily pushing back the entrenching battalion, 6th D.L.I., 1st Worcs. and 2nd Northants, whose lines were regained with the aid of the 1st S.F. reserve. At 11:00 news was received of a German breakthrough north of Proyart, 5 miles (8.0 km) north of Rosières, in the 39th Division area, threatening the still usable Amiens road and a swift advance to the rear of the British lines. The 2nd Devons. and three companies of the 22nd D.L.I. were sent to area and re-established the line there. At 14:00, the remains of the 50th (Northumbrian) Division were forced to give ground to the north of the 8th Division, which was restored with the aid of the 1st S.F., brought across the whole of the division line, the 15th Field Company R.E., 24th T.M.B. and personnel from the brigade headquarters. At 20:00 news was received, that due to the Third Army retiring too far the troops south of the Somme now had an open left flank, and the Germans had begun to cross the Somme at Cerisy, 3.25 miles (5.23 km) north west of Proyart.

Withdrawal of the 8th Division on the Somme March 1918.

At 03:30 on 28 March, orders were received for a withdrawal from their current line to avoid encirclement. The line to be taken up faced north east between Vrély, just south of Rosières, and Caix 2.5 miles (4.0 km) to the north west. the 50th (Northumbrian) Division on a line between Caix and Guillaucourt 2.5 miles (4.0 km) to the north. What was left of the 24th Division was in Vrély, and the remnants of three other divisions (20th (Light), 30th and 36th (Irish)) spread south over the Roye-Ameins road. Covered by the 25th Brigade before going into reserve, the 24th Brigade began to move back at 08:00 and was in place by 11:00, the 23rd by 12:00. The Germans soon pushed back the 24th Division and the 24th Brigade was forced to conform, In the north, Germans who had crossed the Somme forced the 50th Division back, and entered Caix, outflanking the 23rd Brigade and threatening to surround the Division. Orders to retire to Moreuil 7.5 miles (12.1 km) to the south west, were given at 15:00, but the communications of the 23rd Brigade were fractured. The majority of the 2nd Field Company R.E. and the 2nd West Yorks. were killed or captured and the remaining units were required to move on their own initiative. The 2nd Middlesex fought their way out, but became detached from brigade and division and were, for a time, believed captured, until the early hours of 29 March. During the night of 28–29 March the units of the division were collected in Jumal 6 miles (9.7 km) further west, where the 23rd and 24th Brigades were able to get some badly needed sleep. On 29 March however, the 25th Brigade was ordered to hold a portion of the wood north of Moreuil. Finding the Germans already there, after a fighting retreat they established a position on high ground north of the wood.

Early in the morning of 30 March, after orders and counter orders, the 23rd and 24th brigades were to march to Castel 1.75 miles (2.82 km) north west of Moreuil on the river Avre, and hold the bridge. Meanwhile, the 25th Brigade on advice of a French commander had also marched to Castel, finding it already held by French troops marched on to Rouvel 2.25 miles (3.62 km) south west of Castel, where they fed themselves and rested briefly. Later in the morning the Canadian Cavalry Brigade and the 3rd Cavalry Brigade had cleared the Germans from Moreuil wood. At 15:00, with the remains of the 2nd West Yorks. (around 100 men) already supporting the cavalry, the rest of the reassembled division was ordered to relieve the cavalry. The situation in Moreuil was described to the division command as 'obscure', the division advanced, expecting to establish itself on the eastern edge of the wood, with the French on the left and 20th (Light) Division on the right, On arrival, it was found that the Germans were in Moreuil village and the division's line was on the western edge of the wood, the cavalry were relieved around midnight. The next day the Germans massed for an attack, and despite being hit by artillery, by 13:00 had pushed out the patrols of the 2nd Devons. from the wood. A counterattack by 24th Brigade regained a line through the wood. On 1 April another counter-attack by the 2nd Cavalry division at 09:00, cleared the wood and allowed the division line to advance several hundred yards and ended flanking machine gun fire from the Germans. In the afternoon the division was informed it was to be relieved by the French 133rd Division. On 2 April the division was concentrated around Cavillon 9.5 miles (15.3 km) west of Amiens, where they received praise from the army and corps commanders. In the retreat on the Somme the division had suffered 4,943 casualties.

===== Villers Bretonneux =====
The division stayed in the Cavillon area for a week of rest, reorganisation and training. Included in this was the absorption of a large number of drafts as replacements, the two battalions which had suffered the most, the 2nd West Yorks. and 2nd Middlesex, each received around 700 men. The German attack on the Lys on 9 April, caused a flurry or orders and counter orders for movement, and on 12 April the Division was transferred to the Australian Corps reserve, and moved closer to Amiens. On 17 April, the division was transferred again to III Corps, and on the nights of 19-20 and 20–21 April went into the line immediately east of Villers Bretonneux, the 24th brigade relieving the 158th Brigade of the 58th (2/1st London) Division on the right, and the 25th Brigade relieving the 14th Australian Brigade of the 5th Australian Division, on the left. The 23rd Brigade relieved other Australian battalions in and around the village. The division was supported by the artillery of the 20th (Light) Division, its own artillery having just returned from supporting the French on the Luce river and was refitting.

In the days before the arrival of the division, the village and the woods to its west had been heavily shelled with yellow cross gas. On 20 April the gassing of the village stopped but the attack on the woods continued, and holding a line on the edge of eastern edge of the woods, or using them as a covered approach to the village was denied. Casualties due to the gas increased in the division, despite the precautions taken. All of this activity was presumed to presaged a German attack on the village at some point, which was confirmed by prisoners taken in trench raids and deserters. On 23 April a heavy bombardment was carried out on the Germans concentration areas, which hampered, but did not stop the coming attack. Moving into the line (in the village and to east and north east of it) on the evening of 23 April, the 23rd Brigade had suffered casualties from this bombardment. The 25th Brigade was to the south and south east of the village, also having taken casualties from the bombardment.

Map of 8th Div at Villers Bretonneux 1918, the German advance

On 24 April, starting at 03:30, and lasting for 2.5 hours, the Germans launched an intense artillery bombardment of mixed gas and high explosive, which forced the garrison in the village to its outskirts, then attacked with five divisions on an 8,000 yards (7,300 m) front from the northern flank south to Hangard Wood opposite the 58th Division. At 06:30 smoke was put down along the whole front, and combined with the morning mist reduced visibility down to 20 to 30 yards (18 to 27 m), out of which emerged Germans tanks, (Note: A mix of captured British tanks and German A7Vs) unable to stop them with only rifle and machine gun fire, they quickly straddled the trenches and fired down them. One witness stated that a tank fired jets of tear gas. The following infantry attack overwhelmed the three frontline companies of the 2nd West Yorks., and the two southernmost companies of the 2nd Middlesex. The support company of the 2nd Middlesex escaped tank attack and artillery bombardment with only a Captain and six men. To the south, the 2nd West Yorks. were out-flanked and forced north, opening a gap with the 58th Division. During their retreat they were fired on by Germans now in the village and suffered heavy casualties.

The 2nd East Lancs. who were the garrison in the village, had retired to the outskirts to avoid the gas shelling, were rolled up from the flanks or out flanked by the Germans, with the result that few escaped. The remnants formed a thin line to the west of the village by 09:30. The 2nd Devons., to the south west of the village, were unaware of the German advance as none of the 2nd West Yorks. had passed through their lines, when a single German tank appeared through the mist at the battalion headquarters, which it shot up, then moved on. Further tanks and infantry attacks overran the two right hand companies, the remainder and the 1st Worcs. remained on the trench line of the Cachy switch.

To the north the Germans attacked the remaining company of the 2nd Middlesex from the rear and practically destroyed it, a few survivors heading north west. The Germans also managed to get between the front line and support companies of the 2nd R.B., enveloping the latter, the two font line companies almost completely killed or captured. Only the northernmost, B company, maintained its position as the remainder of the battalion and the headquarters troops linked up with the 2nd R.Berks., forming a line along the northern edge of the German attack. The Germans now held the village with their left on the line of the railway. A party of Germans had reached the Bois d'Aquenne, behind the remnants of the 2nd Devons. and 1st Worcs. still in their trenches. In the late morning the 1st S.F. pushed the Germans back to the eastern edge of the wood, but after losing their commanding officer, lost direction and dug in on a road through the wood, here they suffered from a German bombardment by 5.9" guns at Marcelcave.

At around the same time British tanks, initially, light Whippet tanks, arrived on the battlefield. Later heavier tanks arrived and would fight German tanks in the first ever tank versus tank engagement somewhere near Cachy. The Whippets would later disrupt a planned German attack by two battalions of the German 77th Reserve Division, machine gunning and driving through their ranks, "returning to our lines with their sides splashed high with blood". The British artillery was now sweeping the exits from the village, preventing the Germans from advancing further, assisted by the machine gun companies of the division, and rifle fire from the infantry now in an arc around the western end of the village. This was the situation for the rest of the day, with the Germans short of the high ground that would give them direct observation into Amiens.

During the morning of 24 April, the 13th Australian Brigade of the 4th Australian Division was placed under orders of the Division. General Heneker, believed that a daylight attack into the large number of machine guns the Germans had brought onto the field, would not succeed and result only in heavy casualties. He proposed that the attack should proceed after sundown, while the Germans were still reorganising, this was approved by III Corps, with orders issued at 17:30. The attack was to be made by the 54th Brigade from 18th (Eastern) Division, on the right, 13th Australian Brigade under orders of 8th Division in the centre, and 15th Australian Brigade from the 5th Australian Division on the left. The Australian brigades were to advance north and south of the village with the 22nd D.L.I. and the 2nd Northants. attached to the Australian brigades, clearing the north and south of the village respectively. All three brigades were placed under General Heneker's orders. There would be no opportunity to reconnoitre the ground, and artillery preparation would be minimal, with only a standing barrage on selected targets.

Map of 8th Div at Villers Bretonneux 1918, the Allied counterattack

Zero hour was set for 22:00, however the 15th Australian Brigade was delayed by an hour, this meant that 13th Brigade received all of the German's initial attention, as well as having the more difficult terrain and wire diagonally across its line of advance. The brigade held on course however, despite heavy losses to machine gun fire from the village, and the southern flank, where 54th Brigade had not kept up. Despite entering Monument Wood, they were compelled to withdraw to a line out of enfilade fire from the village. The 2nd Northants. had advanced behind the Australians and came under the same intense fire which caused heavy casualties to the battalion headquarters party, resulting in the battalion being commanded by a Major. Advancing toward the village from the south, up a Glacis like slope, they were met with heavy fire from the Germans along railway line, suffering further heavy casualties and were unable to go on. They moved to the right and, contacting the Australians, formed a left flank facing north. The 15th Australian Brigade set off at 23:00, over easier terrain. Meeting some machine gun fire from the north of the village, they were assisted by the tactics used by the Germans;

The enemy was using a lot of flares and these assisted our men in a large measure in locating the positions and posts occupied by him. Our men would watch for the places from which the flares were coming and would then rush and capture them at the point of a bayonet. Buildings on fire in the village also assisted in giving direction. The night itself could not have been better for a night operation; for, although movement could be seen for up to about 200 yards, there was not sufficient light to sight a machine gun. There was very little shelling because the enemy was not sure of the position of his own troops.

— H.Q. 15th Australian Brigade War Diary,

The brigade reached its objective at 04:30 on 25 April, it had not made contact with the 13th Australian Brigade and the village was still occupied by the Germans. (Note: Actually up to 1,000 yards (910 m) short of the intended line, the original front line of 23 April.) The 22nd D.L.I., starting at the same time as the 15th Australian Brigade, were detailed to take the northern part of the village from the north west. They came up against the Germans, alerted by the southern advance of the 13th Australian Brigade an hour earlier in easily defensible and strongly held positions in the villages buildings, and the task of progressing through the village came to a halt. For a time there was some doubt as to the battalion's position at brigade HQ, until 04:00 on 25 April, when still active opposition was reported. The 2nd R.Bks. were then ordered into the village from the north, beginning at 06:30, with the assistance of a company from the 57th Battalion and a simultaneous renewed advance by the 22nd D.L.I. the village was cleared, although some isolated pockets remained for some hours. (Note: Two companies in Edmonds.) The pocket of Germans in the Bois d'Aquenne was also cleared by parties from the 2nd Middlesex, 2nd West Yorks. and the 1st S.F. and three tanks. Almost 500 Germans were captured and over 100 machine guns and a large number of trench mortars taken.

The remainder of the day was spent strengthening the line gained, after two platoons of the 2nd R.B. cleared a railway embankment at the junction of the Australian brigades. Monument wood was still occupied by the Germans and plans were made for the French Moroccan Division to occupy it on 26 April. However the attack was not successful. on 27 April orders were received for the relief of the division, and by that evening the remainder of the 4th Australian Division had taken its place. The division was initially moved to the north west of Amiens, and was in need of rebuilding, having been in battle with veterans still tired from the Somme battles and freshly trained youths, it suffered 3,657 casualties while at Villers Bretonneux, six battalions, including the pioneers, had lost more than 350 men.

==== The Aisne ====
After the end of the Lys offensive, the division was selected to be one of those sent to a quiet sector of the front to recuperate, and replace the French divisions brought north to reinforce the line. Since 23 March the division had lost 8,600 officers and men, and assimilated 7,896 replacements, and was considered in no state to take part in operations. Together with the 21st, 25th and 50th (Northumbrian) Divisions, it was sent to IX Corps as part of the French Sixth Army on 3 May. After only a few days, the Army commander General Duchêne ordered the British divisions into the front line, and on 7 May the division relieved the French 71st Division around Berry-au-Bec, holding a front 10,000 yards (9,100 m) long. The division had been reinforced with French units, the 11th/23rd Territorial battalion, a regiment of field artillery, two batteries of anti-tank guns and two machine gun battalions. the 50th (Northumbrian) Division was on the left and the 21st Division on the right.

The country was very different from that the division had known in the north, the last large scale fighting had been a year before, and was being reclaimed by nature; it was described as idyllic,

To the battered, battle-weary troops, whose only knowledge of France was based on their experience of the northern front, the Champaign country in the full glory of spring was a revelation. Gone was the depressing monotony of Flanders, ... gone the battle-wrecked landscapes of Picardy and the Somme, ... Here all was peace.

The training and assimilation of the replacements was to continue while in the front line. But after only a few days a change was noticed in an increased and methodical action of the German batteries, with experienced observers putting this down to the ranging of new guns. By 25 May, however, the French command was of the opinion that there was no indication of a German offensive in the area. At daybreak of 26 May, increased movement and the appearance of boards (Note: suggested as directions for German tanks.) in the German lines, and by noon IX Corps was warning of a possible attack on the 8th Division front the next day. After intelligence was received about the German attack planned for the next day, the division was ordered to take up battle stations at 18:00.

On General Duchêne's orders, and in defiance of those of General Foch and the advice and experience of British division commanders, the troops were concentrated forward in the line on the eastern 'corner' of the Aisne line. All three brigades were in the line, 23rd Brigade on the left, 24th in the centre and 25th on the right, of the infantry, all but the 1st S.F., the French infantry battalion and two companies each of the 2nd E. Lancs. and 22nd D.L.I. were in front of the river and canal of the Ainse, in an area 4,500 by 2,300 yards (4,100 by 2,100 m). In addition all of the divisions artillery and an artillery brigade from the 25th Division and seven batteries of French artillery were north of the river. On French orders all outpost lines were to be held to the last, and no ground was to be given up. At 21:00 the artillery began a counter-preparation bombardment on the German lines, the Germans did not reply.

Map of Germans Aisne offensive 1918

As expected, at 01:00 on 27 May, the Germans began their bombardment on the whole of the IX Corps front and rear areas, with high explosive and gas, outpost lines were also attacked by trench mortars. Again a mist aided the Germans, the infantry, assisted by tank, attacking at around 04:00, by 05:15 the HQ of the 2nd R. berks. had been bypassed, and by 06:00 most guns north of the river were out of action. By 06:30 the 25th Brigade had been forced back to the river. At this time the division reserve, the 1st S.F. and the French Territorial battalion, were ordered into the gap that had opened up, north of a position at Gernicourt manned by two companies of the 22nd D.L.I. and one of the R.E. Filed Companies. They succeeded in stopping the Germans from crossing the Ainse, midway between Pontavert and Bery-au-Bec, however the Germans crossed the river elsewhere, unhindered by the divisions artillery, which by now was almost non existent. Later in the morning the two battalions, D.L.I. and engineer companies were surrounded and overrun. In the centre, the 24th Brigade was pushed away from the front line, but the 2nd Northants. and 1st Worcs. held a strong line north of the river, until it was out-flanked from the east.

The Germans continually worked around the brigade's positions and by 09:00 the remains of the brigade, three officers and 68 other ranks, were in trenches near Rouchy, the division HQ. The front line of 23rd Brigade, 2nd West Yorks. and 2nd Middlesex, were forced slowly back from the front line and then held their ground in the battle zone north of the river. German tanks sent against them were destroyed by the French anti-tank batteries. After 07:00 they were out-flanked from both sides, from the east by the movement that had gotten behind the other brigades of the division, and one from the west from the 50th Division area, which then pushed south forcing the 2nd Devons. back to Pontavert on the river. Here it was surrounded and was killed or captured almost to the last man. The remnants of the brigade, described as a handful of infantry and a few gunners, were organized to the south, on high ground. With losses of guns from the intense an "uncannily accurate" German artillery bombardment, many of the gunners fought as infantry around their positions as the German infantry arrived and forced them steadily back. The 5th Battery, XLV Brigade, after keeping up fire until the Germans infantry surrounded them, fought on as infantry with only four men escaping, three having been ordered away as they were unarmed. The 2nd Devons. and the 5th Battery (R.H.A.) were later cited in French Army orders and awarded the Croix de Guerre with bronze palm. By mid morning the remains of the division were across the river and were estimated to be no more than 1,000 strong.

By 10:00 the division commander was forced to use his final reserves, men from the division train and 600 men who had been sent to Lewis gun training, on the advice that an attack was not expected. They occupied a line that ran approximately 1,500 yards (1,400 m) south of the river on northern slopes of higher ground. At 13:20, 75th Brigade from the 25th Division, arrived and was placed under the orders of General Heneker, the two battalions deployed forward were reinforced by the remnants of the division. (Note: 23rd Brigade with the 11th battalion Cheshire Regiment on the left and the 24th and 25th brigades with the 2nd battalion South Lancashire Regiment.) The other brigades of the 25th Division deployed to the left (74th Brigade) and right (7th Brigade). In the early afternoon, German preparations for a renewed assault were clearly visible from the heights, but the British were unable to interfere with them with artillery, all the while the Germans continued to shell the British rear areas. Between 16:00 and 17:00, under cover of heavy trench mortar fire, the Germans again advanced, piercing the line at the junction of the 7th Brigade, and vigorously exploiting the gap. by 19:30 the line had been pushed back another 3,500 yards (3,200 m) to the crest of hills separating the Ainse valley from that of the Vesle. In spite of being reinforced with 500 stragglers rounded up by the division's officers and the division's headquarters personnel, the line was further pushed back at pace. The entire 25th Field Ambulance was captured in Bouvancourt, without knowing they were in danger.

In the early hours of 28 May the division line was outflanked again and compelled a withdrawal to the line of the Vesle. Brigadier General Grogan, commander of the 23rd Brigade was ordered to command all troops on a line 1 mile (1.6 km) either side of Jonchery with the 75th Brigade on the right in contact with the 21st Division. These troops were made up of men from the 8th, 25th and 50th Divisions crossing the river at Jonchery, these were organised along a railway embankment, and kept the Germans at bay until 13:00, when the Germans broke through the 50th Division line on the left, and they were once again compelled to withdraw.

All the morning's work of consolidation had been for nothing, and as the tired khaki figure struggled up the steep slope south of the river, they could see enemy artillery and transport pouring in continuous streams down the two roads converging on Jonchery, while infantry swarmed busily across the open country. It was a sight given to gunners only in dreams, but not a gun was available. (Note: Only seven 18-pounders were available to the division at this time.)

— Capt. S Rodgerson, 2nd West Yorks.,

Briefly holding a line on the ridge some 1.3 miles (2.1 km) south west of Jonchery, Gen. Grogan's force and the 75th Brigade became intermingled with battalions from the French 154th Division, and were forced, briefly, off the high ground, regaining it with a counter-attack by a French regiment and the remaining 120 men from the 2nd Devons. who had been in the transport lines when the battle had begun. At 19:30 Gen. Heneker was ordered to take over command of the sector and the troops of the 50th Division, and was informed that the 57th Brigade (19th (Western) Division) was being dispatched to him. By now Gen. Heneker had eight batteries of artillery under his command, seven of 18-pounders and one of howitzers, gathered from eight artillery brigades of four divisions.

With French troops either side of the 75th Brigade, and thus two division commanders responsible for the same front, and after a "fairly quiet" night, the line held until 13:00 29 May, when after over two hours of German assault the British and French were forced to withdraw with the new line, running north east to south west almost at right angles to the previous line between the villages of Coucelles and Faverolles, some 3 miles (4.8 km) long. The troops of the 57th Brigade began to arrive and were placed in the southern half of the line. The remainder consisted of a "motley crew":

The General himself [Grogan], his brigade staff officers, [Capt.] Smythe the G.S.O.3, 8th Division; Major Cope of the 2/ Devonshire; Lieut.-Colonel Moore of the 1/ Sherwood Foresters, the only infantry C.O. of the division not already a casualty; two colonels of the 50th Division without a single man of the units they once commanded; a knot of machine gunners from the same division whose guns refused to function from lack of water; a woeful sprinkling of all units of the 8th and most of the 25th and 50th Divisions; in all about 200 - all hungry, sleepless, dirty, many bleeding from wounds of greater of lesser severity. A number of French colonial troops completed the toll of men.

— Capt. S Rodgerson, 2nd West Yorks.,

At around 15:00 having located their positions, the Germans began to bombard them, and at 17:45 the infantry attacked forcing a withdrawal onto another ridge line. Falling back the troops met with the 2nd Wiltshires. from 19th Division in the village of Bouleuse. They were reinforced by a composite battalion of "stragglers, details and other oddments" mostly 8th Division troops, and a group of seven machine guns. Reinforcements continued, later in the evening two battalions from the 56th Brigade (19th (Western Division) arrived. These reinforcements secured the ridge and the night passed quietly.

During the night Gen. Grogan was relieved of command of the troops on the Bouleuse ridge by the G.O.C. of the 56th Brigade, and later in the morning of 30 May 8th Division command was taken over by 19th Division. This still left some 800 men and 13 guns from the division still on the field. They were reinforced on 2 and 3 June by a composite battalion of three companies of 150 men each from the 8th Division rear areas and a machine gun company. Together with the other 8th Division troops there, these were organised into the 1/8th and 2/8th Composite Battalions, the 2/8th going into the line on 7 June. These were involved in the final German attacks in what had become the eastern flank of the German advance on a position some 2 miles (3.2 km) south of the Bouleuse ridge. On the night of 30–31 May what was left of the division not engaged was moved south of the Marne river, south east of Épernay. During the Ainse operation the division had lost, killed, wounded and missing, 366 officers, including all of the infantry battalion commanders, and 7,496 men, it being reported that

It may be said without exaggeration that all the gallant battalions of the division have ceased to exist as fighting units.

— Maj. Gen. Heneker, G.O.C. 8th Division,

The composite battalions re-joined the division on 12 and 17 June respectively after a further 35 casualties. The division was now at Pleurs 24 miles (39 km) south of Épernay.

==== Reconstruction ====
The division had the unenviable position of second place in a rank of losses to British divisions since the start of the Spring Offensive, beaten by the 50th (Northumbrian) Division, fewer than 300 casualties 'ahead'. On 14 and 15 June the division entrained for Huppy, 7 miles (11 km) south west of Abbeville, under XIX Corps of the Fourth Army. For the third time in two months the division had the task of rebuilding itself after heavy losses, this time with drafts from disbanded battalions of the new army, the change in battalion and regiment causing some resentment at first. As a non-regular battalion, the 22nd D.L.I. was disbanded, its surviving men joining the 1/7th D.L.I. on its transfer to the division from the 50th. On 22 and 23 June the division moved north the Gamaches and St.Valery area near the coast, where better training facilities existed, coming under command of XXII Corps and the Second Army. In spite of the intensive training undertaken, it was not forgotten that many of the man had recently had prolonged physical and mental strain. Only two of the infantry battalion commanders returned after recovering from wounds, those of the 2nd Northants. and 1st S.F.. While near the sea the opportunity was taken for bathing in the fine weather of the divisions stay there. On 18 July the division's artillery was ordered to move to the First Army Area, and the next day the rest of the division was ordered to follow.

==== Advance in Picardy ====
Arriving in the Arras sector, the division was transferred to VIII Corps and the division HQ set up at Villers-au-Bois, 7 mi (11 km) north west of the town. On arrival at Pernes, the train carrying the 2nd East Lancs. was machine gunned by a German aircraft while in a siding, fortunately without casualties. By 23 July the division had relieved the 52nd (Lowland) Division in front of Vimy Ridge on a two brigade front. The 4th Canadian Division was to its right and the 20th (Light) Division to its left. In addition to its own artillery the division was supported by the Army Artillery CCXLII Brigade R.F.A. and XVI Brigade R.G.A. and four 15-pounder anti-tank guns in the front line.

The division began the usual routine of active trench defence; the Germans opposite were sheltered in deep dug-outs, behind strong belts of wire and "showed little enterprise". On 8 August the King visited the division and presented Brig. Gen Grogan with his V.C., earned for the defensive actions in the Aisne retreat. On 13 August, due to the transfer of troops to the Amiens front, the division was side-stepped to the south, taking over the two brigade front of the 52nd (Lowland) Division and giving one of its positions to the 20th (Light) Division. The division was now on a three brigade, 9,000 yd (8,200 m) long front, and only the quietness of the front allowed training to be done, with one battalion and one battery from each infantry and artillery brigade out of the line. The British and Germans used gas when the conditions were suitable.

Throughout August, the battle began at Amiens moved north and by 26 August the advance was now along either bank Scarpe river, some 3 mi (4.8 km) to the south of the division, advances by the 51st (Highland) Division covering the flank of the Canadian Corps. That evening the division was ordered to send out patrols to probe and if possible occupy the German line. By 06:00 on 27 August some parts of the support line had been reached and German opposition was encountered from Oppy wood and Arleux about 1 mi (1.6 km) to the north west. The division was once more ordered to side step to the south, the 25th Brigade being moved from the north end of the division line to the south, in the village of Gavrelle recently found empty by the 51st (Highland) Division. On 28 August the Germans counter-attacked and regained Oppy wood, but were driven out the next day. At this time the division was ordered to consolidate its position. In late September a series of attacks were made to improve the tactical situation on the trench line of the division, aligning the division's front line along the old German reserve line. At this time the Allies had advanced up to the Hindenburg Line.

Yet again the division was side-stepped south, on 3 October the line was extended south to the Scarpe at Plouvain, 6.5 mi (10.5 km) west of Arras, releasing a northern sector to the 20th (Light) Division. It was now the division's turn to take part in the general advance. The first target was the Rouvroy-Fresnes German trench line about 500 yd (460 m) in front of the current line. Before the opening of the attack, patrols were sent out and succeeded in occupying the village of Oppy in the afternoon of 6 October. At 05:00 on 7 October, with the aid of artillery observers south of the Scarpe, where the front line was to the west of the division, an artillery bombardment was fired along the German wire entanglements. The 23rd Brigade (2nd Middlesex and 2nd West Yorks.) entered the village of Biache St. Vaast on the southern edge of the line at 08:00. In the centre the 2nd R.B. and 2nd R. Bks. attacked the southern edge of the Rouvroy-Fresnes line and then proceeded to advance north along it. In the north the trench line was entered by the 1st Worcs. in advance of schedule, they then moved north and south along it, meeting up with the other battalions of the brigade. By nightfall on 8 October the division was securely on the former German line, having taken 218 prisoners, for 229 casualties, of which 18 were killed.

The next objective for the division was the German's Drocourt-Quéant line along the line of the villages of Vitry-en-Artois (on the Scarpe) and Izel-les-Equerchin, some 2,600 yd (2,400 m) to the east., With insufficient artillery for an assault along the whole of the division's three brigade line, it was decided to concentrate on a two battalion front. The 2nd Devons and 2nd Middlesex were to attack to the north of Vitry-en-Artois, soon after the attack began at 05:10 on 11 October the objectives were gained and as soon as it was light it was seen that the Germans were retiring; the whole of the division was ordered forward. The Drocourt-Quéant line in front of the division was taken by 09:30; it was later learned that the Germans had intended to retire from the line and had begun to do so at 03:00 that morning, intending to leave a strong rear-guard, the assault caught these preparations before they could be completed. The division continued to advance and by the end of the day had advanced 8,000 yd (7,300 m) in the centre and 4,000 yd (2.3 mi; 3.7 km) on the flanks, with the 2nd Middlesex sending troops south of the Scarpe to reduce a strong point that was impeding the battalion and parts of the 1st Canadian Division. The intention now was for the German withdrawal to be prevented from being conducted in an orderly manner, with time to prepare further defensive positions properly. This was shown in the amount of stores left behind by the Germans and the incomplete or not attempted demolitions. The country had been the subject artillery bombardment for four years and the routes taken by the division needed repair by engineers and pioneers and those from VIII Corps.

The Germans intended to hold the line of the Sensée Canal to the west of Douai, deep lines of wire were in place, the west bank had been breached, flooding the area near the Scarpe and the buildings on the east bank gave ample cover for machine guns. The German artillery was active and with their knowledge of the ground, siting of British artillery in covered positions resulted in accurate return fire. The need to force the canal line was removed by advances in other parts of the front on the river Lys and the river Selle, making the canal line position a salient, which was soon abandoned. On 15 October the German short range artillery ceased and by 17 October it was seen that the infantry was retiring. The division entered Douai on the afternoon on 17 October and found the civilians had been evacuated, with anything of value removed and most of the remainder smashed.

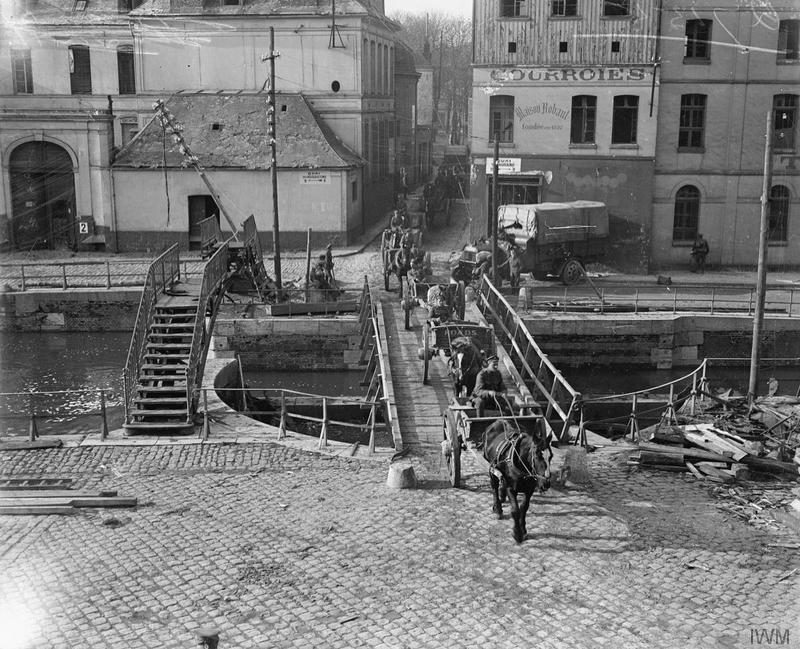
Horse transport crossing a temporary bridge over the canal in Douai after its occupation by the 8th Division.

The advance continued over flat ground intersected by many streams and ditches, the bridges over which had been destroyed, as had many road crossings. Not only the pioneers and engineers were engaged in making repairs but also the artillery and medical services of the division. The division now proceeded on a two brigade front and on 18 and 19 October received a platoon cyclists from VIII Corps and C Squadron of the 4th Hussars (with a section of the division's field guns) as reconnaissance troops. At 13:00 on 19 October the 2nd East Lancs. entered the town of Marchiennes, 9.2 mi (14.8 km) north east of Douai, to the great delight of its inhabitants, the town had been prepared for destruction but the mines were not detonated. The Germans did take all of the food in the town. By the end of the day the division had advanced 12.5 mi (20.1 km) east north east past Douai.

On 20 October the division made no forward moves, attempting to bring up rations for itself and the civilians; the roads increasingly filled with civilians on the move. The advance began again on 21 October with patrols from the 2nd East Lincs. and 1st S.F. entering Saint-Amand-les-Eaux 7 mi (11 km) north east of Marchiennes after some street fighting. The town was found to be full of civilians, including some of those evacuated by the Germans from Douai, the Germans shelled and gassed the town shortly after it was entered by the British causing civilian casualties. The division was approaching a defended line of waterways, the canalised Scarpe which ran south and east of Saint-Amand-les-Eaux, then turned north to join the Scheldt, which ran south east to north west 3.75 mi (6.04 km) north east of the town. Despite the bridges being destroyed, parties of the 1st S.F crossed the Scarpe, under cover of the division machine gunners, south east of Saint-Amand-les-Eaux on planks over the debris of a rail bridge and by the evening of 22 October had occupied hamlets 0.5 mi (0.80 km) to the south east. Advancing east towards the Scheldt, the division encountered strong German defences on the elevations in front of the village of Odomez and an attempt on 24 October to take village by the 2nd Northants. and the division cyclists was repulsed. After massed machine gun and artillery fire, the 2nd Northants overran the village on the morning of 25 October. (Note: Since 23 October, the additional artillery supporting the division were the XLV and CCCXI Army Brigades R.F.A.) The Germans had flooded the area, which lies in a corner of a bend in the Scheldt and only one company of the machine gun battalion was moved forward to the west bank to harass the Germans. The Germans were now behind two canals, the Scheldt and the Canal du Jard which runs parallel, close to the east of it. Due to the convergence of the British advance the divisional line was now only one brigade wide. (Note: On 26 October the additional supporting artillery was replaced by the XXXIII and XLVIII Army Brigades and the squadron of the 4th Hussars returned to their parent unit.)

After a reconnaissance on 26 October, the following night three companies of the 2nd Devons attempted to cross the river and canal at the double. Much machine gun and artillery fire caused C and D Companies to withdraw, A Company, established a small force between the river and canal. The position was exposed and on the morning of 28 October the Germans overran and captured the position. Three of the 2nd Devons. and four machine gunners escaped. Another attack was planned for 2–3 November but other advances 6.5 mi (10.5 km) to the south west, forced the division into an earlier advance. On the evening of 30 October the 2nd Devons again crossed the Scarpe, this time on Jerusalem pontoon bridges, the three companies that crossed were confined to the narrow strip between the river and canal by artillery fire, also falling on the west bank of the Scheldt. With no advance by the divisions either side across the Scheldt, the decision was made to withdraw the 2nd Devons and by that evening they had returned bringing 80 of their wounded with them. On 1 November the division was shifted south east in the line to the even more flooded corner of the Scheldt. On the evening of 4/5 November the division was relieved by the 52nd (Highland) Division, and went into Army reserve in the Marchiennes area.

The rest was to be short, on 8 November the division was ordered back into the right of VIII Corps line, to support advances made over the Scheldt. On 9 November two battalions of the 23rd Brigade, 2nd Middlesex and 2nd West Yorks. were ordered to relieve Canadian infantry at Pommerœul 5.5 mi (8.9 km) east of the Scheldt and 2.25 mi (3.62 km) over the Belgian border. Setting off at 12:00 9 November from Escaupont, due to the state of the roads they managed to get as far as Thulin, 3 mi (4.8 km) short of their intended destination by early the next morning, after a wait of nearly nine hours and a bus journey of 15 mi (24 km) taking six hours. The next day the battalions were ordered to take over from the 157th Brigade of 52nd (Lowland) Division at Douvain, some 5.25 mi (8.45 km) north east of Thulin. In the early morning of 11 November, the 2nd Middlesex, with the 4th Hussars (once more under command of the division) met a weak German rear guard on the Erbisœl-Mons railway, 2.25 mi (3.62 km) to the north east. At 07:09 the Divisional HQ received word of the cease-fire, and by 11:00 patrols of the 2nd Middlesex were 3.75 mi (6.04 km) north north east of Mons.

===== Disbandment =====
On 15 November the division was relieved by the 52nd (Lowland) Division, and informed that it was not to be part of the Army of Occupation. Billeted in Tounai, on 5 December the Croix de Guerre won by the 2nd Devons and 5th Battery R.F.A. were presented, it provided a guard of honour composed of men who had served with the division since 1914 on the King's visit to the town on 8 December. Between 15 and 17 December it marched to Ath to begin the disbandment, while the men continued with training, education and recreation. Most of the division's units were regular army, which would be returned to strength and resume their peace time deployments, only the pioneers and field ambulance being disbanded. On 29 January 1919, General Desgoutte presented further Croix de Guerre and Legions de Honour to units and men of the division. On 15 March 1919 General Heneker left the division to command the Southern Division of the Army of Occupation, praising the division, he ended with

I have come out of the war with one conviction at all events, and this is that the finest man of God's earth is the British Private Soldier.

— Major-General Heneker G.O.C. 8th Division.

In the almost four years on the front line the division had suffered 63,858 officers and other ranks killed, wounded and missing.

== Order of Battle ==
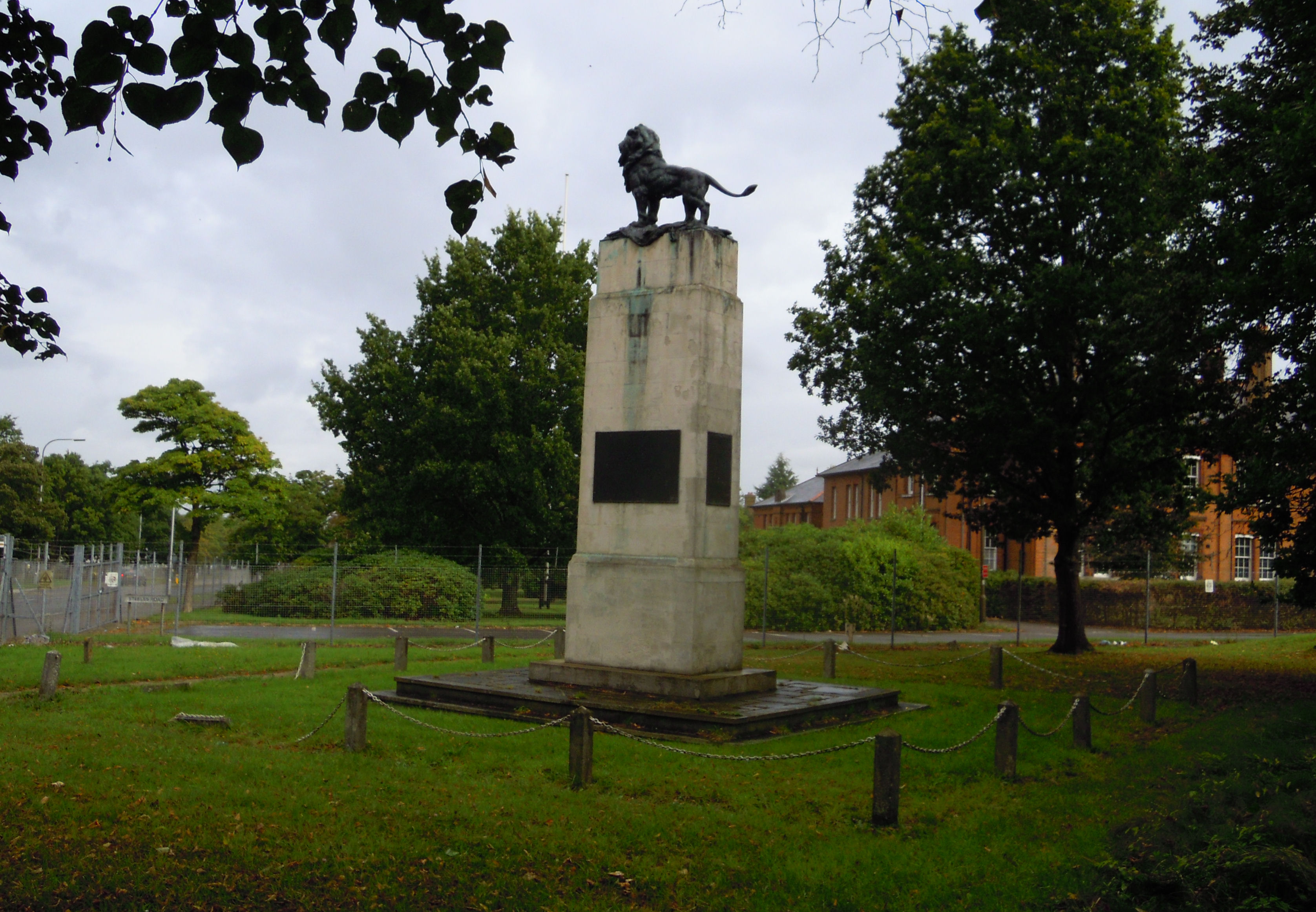
Memorial to the 8th Infantry Division in Aldershot dedicated in 1924

The division had the following organisation during World War I:

23rd Brigade

- 2nd Battalion Devonshire Regiment
- 2nd Battalion Prince of Wales's Own (West Yorkshire Regiment)
- 2nd Battalion Cameronians (Scottish Rifles) (until February 1918)
- 2nd Battalion Middlesex Regiment
- 1/7th (T.F.) Battalion Middlesex Regiment (from 15 March 1915 until 8 February 1916)
- 1/8th (T.F.) Battalion Middlesex Regiment (from 21 June 1915, merging with 1/7th from 23 June to 2 August, left 27 August 1915, to 25th Bde.)
- 1/6th (T.F.) Battalion Cameronians (Scottish Rifles) (from 22 March 1915 until 2 June 1915)
- 23rd Machine Gun Company M.G.C. (formed 15 January 1916, left 20 January 1918)
- 23rd Trench Mortar Battery (formed January 1916)

24th Brigade

- 1st Battalion Worcestershire Regiment
- 1st Battalion Sherwood Foresters
- 2nd Battalion Northamptonshire Regiment
- 2nd Battalion East Lancashire Regiment (to 25th Bde. February 1918)
- 1/5th (T.F.) Battalion the Black Watch (from 13 November 1914, became division pioneers October 1915)
- 1/4th (T.F.) Battalion Queen's Own Cameron Highlanders (from 22 February 1915 until 8 April 1915)
- 24th Machine Gun Company M.G.C. (formed 19 January 1916, left 20 January 1918)
- 24th Trench Mortar Battery (formed January 1916)

Between October 1915 and July 1916, the 24th Brigade swapped with the 70th Brigade from the 23rd Division.

25th Brigade

- 2nd Battalion Princess Charlotte of Wales's (Royal Berkshire Regiment)
- 2nd Battalion Rifle Brigade
- 1st Battalion Royal Irish Rifles (until February 1918)
- 2nd Battalion Lincolnshire Regiment (until February 1918)
- 2nd Battalion East Lancashire Regiment (from 24th Bde. February 1918)
- 1/13th (T.F.) (Princess Louise) Kensington Battalion London Regiment (from 13 November until 20 May 1915)
- 1/1st (T.F.) (City of London) Battalion London Regiment (from 13 March 1915 until 8 February 1916)
- 1/8th (T.F.) Battalion Middlesex Regiment (from 27 August 1915 until 8 February 1916)
- 25th Machine Gun Company M.G.C. (formed 10 January 1916, left 20 January 1918)
- 25th Trench Mortar Battery (formed January 1916)

70th Brigade

The 70th Brigade was from the 23rd Division and was attached to the 8th Division between 18 October 1915 and 15 July 1916, swapping with the 24th Brigade.

Division Troops

- Divisional Mounted Troops
  - 1/1st Northamptonshire Yeomanry (left April 1915)
  - C Sqn 1/1st Northumberland Hussars Yeomanry (joined April 1915, left 13 May 1916)
  - 8th Company Army Cyclist Corps (left 12 May 1916)
- Pioneers
  - 1/5th (T.F.) Battalion the Black Watch (from October 1915 to January 1916)
  - 22nd (Service) Battalion, Durham Light Infantry (from 2 July 1916)
  - 1/7th (T.F.) Battalion, Durham Light Infantry (from 20 June 1918, absorbed 22nd D.L.I. on 3 July)
- Machine Gun Corps (MGC)
  - 218th Company MGC (joined 23 March 1917, formed 8th MG Battalion 20 January 1918)
  - No 8 Battalion MGC (formed 20 January 1918 from 23rd, 24th, 25th and 218th Coys MGC)
- Service Corps (ASC)
  - 8th Divisional Train ASC
    - 42nd, 84th, 85th and 87th Companies
- 211th Divisional Employment Company (joined May 1917)
- 8th Divisional Motor Ambulance Workshop (joined 20 October 1914, transferred to Divisional Train 9 April 1916)
- 15th Mobile Veterinary Section Army Veterinary Corps (AVC)

Artillery

- V Brigade, Royal Horse Artillery (left 13 January 1917)
  - O and Z batteries, six 18-pounder guns
  - D battery, four 4.5" Howitzers (after May 1916)
- XXXIII Brigade, Royal Field Artillery (R.F.A.)
  - 32nd, 33rd, 36th batteries, six 18-pounder guns
  - 55th battery, four 4.5" Howitzers (after May 1916)
- XLV Brigade, R.F.A.
  - 1st, 3rd, 5th batteries, six 18-pounder guns
  - 57th battery, four 4.5" Howitzers (after May 1916)
- CXXVIII Howitzer Brigade R.F.A. (reorganised and disbanded in May 1916)
  - 55th and 57th batteries, six 4.5" Howitzers (reduced to four, and D battery created in May 1916)
- 8th Divisional Ammunition Column R.F.A.
- U.8 Heavy Trench Mortar Battery R.F.A. (formed 5 June 1916, disbanded 8 August 1916)
- W.8 Heavy Trench Mortar Battery R.F.A. (formed May 1916, left February 1918)
- X.8, Y.8 and Z.8 Medium Mortar Batteries R.F.A. (joined May 1916, Z broken upon 3 February 1918, and distributed to X and Y batteries)

Engineers

- 2nd Field Company Royal Engineers
- 15th Field Company Royal Engineers
- 1/1st Home Counties Field Company (T.F.) Royal Engineers (from 2 February 1915; became 490th (Home Counties) Field Company February 1917)
- 8th Division Signals Company (T.F.)

Royal Army Medical Corps

- 24th, 25th, and 26th (1st, 2nd and 3rd Wessex) Field Ambulances
- 14th Sanitary Section (joined 9 January 1915, left 16 April 1917)

== Awards ==
=== Victoria Cross ===
- Lt. Philip Neame, 15th Field Company, 19 December 1914, Neuve Chapelle
- Pte. Jacob Rivers, 1st Sherwood Foresters, 10 March 1915, Neuve Chapelle
- C.S.M. Harry Daniels, 2nd Rifle Brigade, 12 March 1915, Neuve Chapelle
- Cpl. Cecil Noble, 2nd Rifle Brigade, 12 March 1915, Neuve Chapelle
- Cpl. Charles Richard Sharpe, 2nd Lincolnshire Regiment, 9 May 1915 Aubers Ridge
- Cpl James Upton, 1st Sherwood Foresters, 9 May 1915 Aubers Ridge
- 2nd Lt. George Edward Cates, 2nd Rifle Brigade, 8 March 1917, Bouchavesnes
- Brig. General Clifford Coffin, 25th Infantry Brigade, 31 July 1917, Westheok
- Capt. T R Colyer-Fergusson, 2nd Northamptonshire Regiment, 31 July 1917, Bellewaarde
- Lt. Col. Frank Crowther Roberts, 1st Worcestershire Regiment, 22 March – 2 April 1918, the Somme
- Capt. Alfred Toye, 2nd Middlesex Regiment, 25 March 1918, Eterpigny Ridge
- Brig. General George Grogan, 23rd Infantry Brigade, 27–29 May 1918, Jonchery

In addition to the V.C.s noted above, the men of the division were awarded the following.

British awards
| Knight Commander of the Order of the Bath | 2 |
| Companion of the Order of the Bath | 9 |
| Companion of the Order of St Michael and St George | 30 |
| Commander of the Order of the British Empire (military) | 1 |
| Distinguished Service Order | 130 and 27 bars |
| Officer of the Order of the British Empire (military) | 8 |
| Member of the Order of the British Empire | 3 |
| Military Cross | 615, 47 bars and 3 second bars |
| Distinguished Conduct Medal | 454, 12 bars and 1 second bar |
| Military Medal | 1,596 and 83 bars |
| Meritorious Service Medal | 167 |
| Albert Medal | 1 |
| Mentioned in dispatches | 1,176, 26 second and 3 third mentions |
French awards
| Legiond'Honneur - Commandeur | 1 |
| Legion of Honour - Officer | 1 |
| Legion of Honour - Chevalier | 1 |
| Croix de Guerre with palm (Army) | 3 |
| Croix de Guerre with gilt star (Corps) | 3 |
| Croix de Guerre with bronze star (Regiment/Brigade) | 1 |

In addition, unit awards of the Croix de Guerre were made to:-

- Devonshire Regiment (2nd Battalion) (with palm)
- 5th Battery (XLV Brigade) R.F.A. (with palm)
- 24th Field Ambulance (with gilt star)

== General Officers Commanding ==
- 19 September 1914 Major-General Francis Davies C.B.
- 27 July 1915 Brigadier-General Reginald Oxley (acting)
- 1 August 1915 Major-General Havelock Hudson C.B., C.I.E
- 10 December 1916 Major-General William Heneker D.S.O.

== Battle Insignia ==
The practice of wearing battalion specific insignia (often called battle patches) in the B.E.F. began in mid 1915 with the arrival of units of Kitchener's Armies and was widespread after the Somme Battles of 1916. The patches shown were adopted by the division during late 1917, and were designed to an overall divisional scheme. The 8th Division was unique in having a comprehensive system of patches covering almost all units. The patches were worn on both sleeves.

| Top row: division Headquarters. Bottom: division supply column. |
| Division artillery. |
| Top row: HQ Royal Engineers. Bottom row: 2nd, 15th and 490th Field Companies R.E. and divisional pioneers, 22nd D.L.I., colours reversed when 1/7th D.L.I became pioneers in February 1918. |
| Top row: 23rd Brigade HQ. 2nd row: 2nd Devons., 2nd West Yorks., 2nd S.R. and 2nd Middlesex. 3rd row: 2nd Devons. after February 1918. Bottom row: 23rd machine gun company and 23rd trench mortar battery. |
| Top row, 24th Brigade HQ. Middle row: 1st Worcs., 2nd East Lancs., 1st S.F., 2nd Northants. Bottom row: 24th machine gun company and 24th trench mortar battery. |
| Top row, 25th Brigade HQ: 2nd row, 2nd Lincs., 2nd R. Berks., 1st R.I.R. and 2nd R.B. 3rd row: 2nd R. Berks. and 2nd East Lancs, after Feb 1918. Bottom row, 25th machine gun company and 25th trench mortar battery. |
| Left: 8th Machine Gun Battalion M.G.C. (from January 1918), right: Machine Gun signal section R.E. |
| Top row: Assistant Director Medical Services. Bottom row, 23rd 24th and 25th Field Ambulance R.A.M.C. |
| Top row: HQ and No. 1 Coy. R.A.S.C. Bottom row: Nos. 2, 3 and 4 Companies. R.A.S.C. |

== Bibliography ==
- Boraston, J. H.; Bax, C. E. O. (1999) [1926]. The Eighth Division in War 1914–1918 (facs. repr. N & M Press, Uckfield ed.). London: Medici Society. ISBN 978-1-897632-67-3.
- Edmonds, James E (2019) [1937]. Military Operations: France and Belgium, March–April: Continuation of the German Offensives. History of the Great War based on Official Documents by Direction of the Committee of Imperial Defence. Vol. II (pbk. facs. repr. The Imperial War Museum Department of Printed Books and The Naval & Military Press, Uckfield ed.). London: Macmillan. ISBN 978-1-84574-726-8.
- Hart, P. (2009). 1918. A Very British Victory. London: Orion Books. ISBN 978-0-7538-2689-8.
- Hibberd, Mike (2016). Infantry Divisions, Identification Schemes 1917 (1st ed.). Wokingham: The Military History Society. OCLC 964700810.
- Wyrall, E. (2002) [1939]. The History of the 50th Division, 1914–1919 (facs. repr. Naval & Military Press, Uckfield ed.). London: P. Lund, Humphries. ISBN 1-84342-206-9.
