= Frederick Charles Riggs =

Recipient of the Victoria Cross

VC MM Frederick Charles Riggs
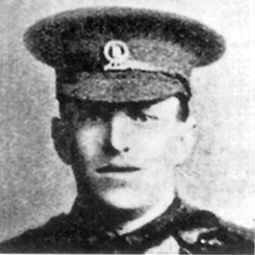
- Born: 28 July 1888; Bournemouth, Hampshire
- Died: 1 October 1918 (aged 30); Near Epinoy, France
- Military career
- Allegiance: United Kingdom
- Branch: British Army
- Rank: Sergeant
- Units: The York and Lancaster Regiment
- Conflicts: First World War: Hundred Days Offensive; Battle of the Canal du Nord †
- Awards: Victoria Cross; Military Medal

Frederick Charles Riggs VC MM (28 July 1888 – 1 October 1918) was an English recipient of the Victoria Cross, the highest and most prestigious award for gallantry in the face of the enemy that can be awarded to British and Commonwealth forces.

== Early life ==
He was born in Springbourne, Bournemouth, and was adopted by Mrs G. Burgum when he was about five years old. He grew up in the Malmesbury Park area of Bournemouth, and was one of two recipients of the Victoria Cross from Capstone Road; the other being Cecil Reginald Noble. A nearby neighbourhood of Bournemouth is named Charminster, and has led to the confused suggestion that Noble lived in the village of Charminster in Dorset. He lived at 39 Capstone Road and attended Malmesbury Park Primary School as it is known now. There is a memorial for him now inside the school.

== Details ==
Riggs was 30 years old, and a Sergeant in the 6th Battalion, The York and Lancaster Regiment, British Army during the First World War at the battle of the Canal du Nord when the following deed took place for which he was awarded the VC.

On 1 October 1918 near Epinoy, France, Sergeant Riggs, having led his platoon through strong uncut wire under severe fire, continued straight on and although losing heavily from flanking fire, succeeded in reaching his objective, where he captured a machine-gun. Later he handled two captured guns with great effect and caused 50 of the enemy to surrender. Subsequently, when the enemy again advanced in force, Sergeant Riggs cheerfully encouraged his men exhorting them to resist to the last, and while doing so was killed.

== The medal ==
His Victoria Cross is displayed at The York and Lancaster Regiment Museum contained within the Clifton Park Museum in Rotherham, South Yorkshire, England.

== Bibliography ==
- The Register of the Victoria Cross. This England. 1997. ISBN 0-906324-03-3.
- Gliddon, Gerald (2000). VCs of the First World War - The Final Days 1918. Sutton Publishing. ISBN 0-7509-2485-3.
- Harvey, David (2000). Monuments to Courage. Naval & Military Press Ltd. ISBN 1-84342-356-1.
