= Harry Daniels (British Army officer) =

British Army officer (1884–1953)

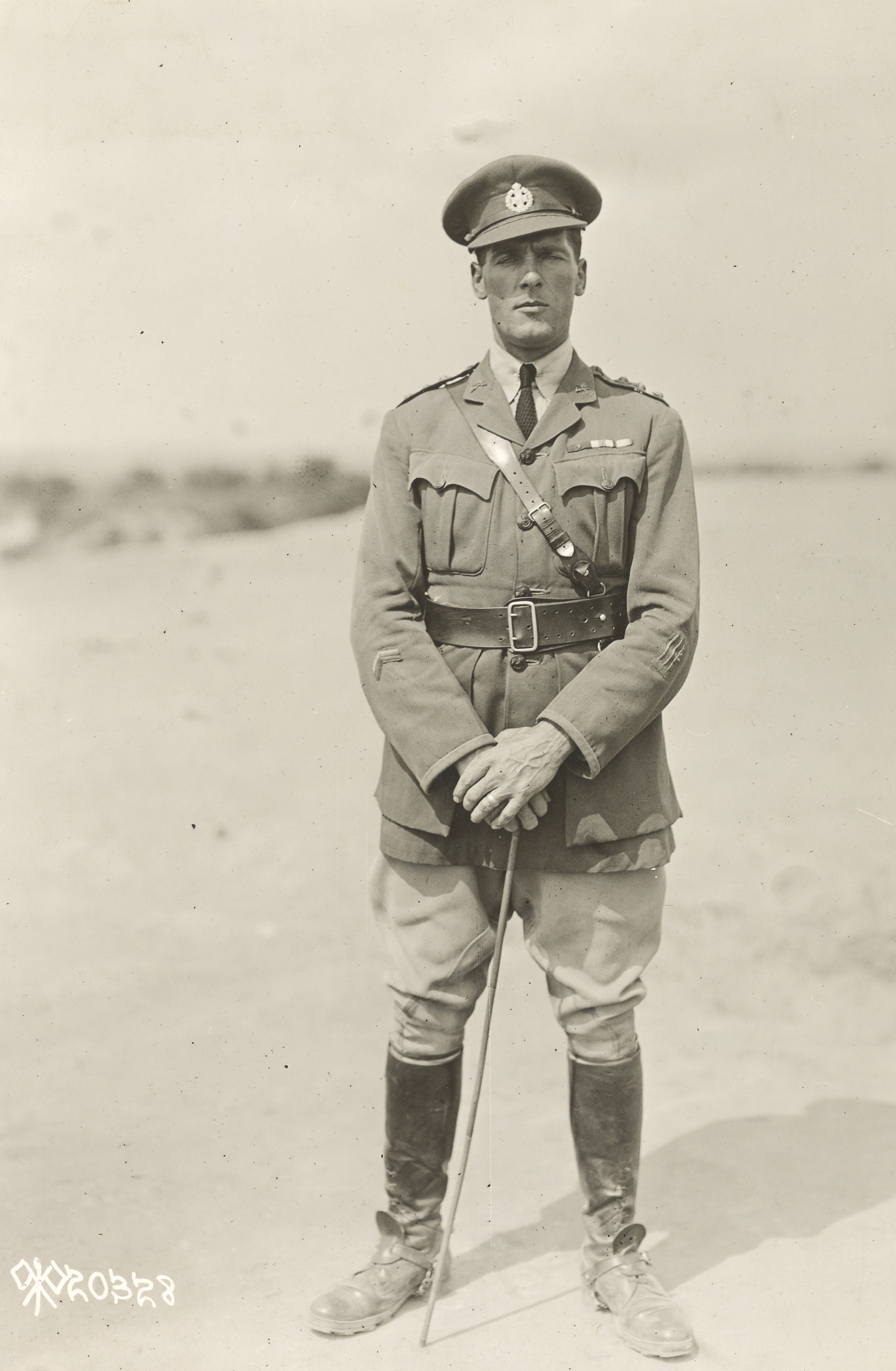
- Harry Daniels as a training instructor in the United States, September 1918.
- Born: 13 December 1884; Wymondham, Norfolk, England
- Died: 13 December 1953 (aged 69); Leeds, West Yorkshire, England
- Burial place: Lawnswood Crematorium, Leeds, West Yorkshire, England
- Military career
- Allegiance: United Kingdom
- Branch: British Army
- Rank: Lieutenant Colonel
- Units: Rifle Brigade (The Prince Consort's Own)
- Conflicts: World War I World War II
- Awards: Victoria Cross; Military Cross

Lieutenant Colonel Harry Daniels VC MC (13 December 1884 − 13 December 1953) was a British Army officer and an English recipient of the Victoria Cross (VC), the highest and most prestigious award for gallantry in the face of the enemy that can be awarded to British and Commonwealth forces.

Harry Daniels was the thirteenth child of a baker in Wymondham, Norfolk. He joined the British Army at a young age and served abroad in India.

He was 30 years old, and a Company Sergeant-Major in the 2nd Battalion of The Rifle Brigade (Prince Consort's Own), British Army during the First World War when the following deed took place for which he was awarded the VC.

On 12 March 1915 at Neuve Chapelle, France, his unit was ordered into an advance on the German trenches across no-man's land which was covered by machine guns and strewn with barbed wire. Daniels and another man, Cecil Reginald Noble, voluntarily rushed in front with cutters and attacked the wires They were both wounded at once, Noble dying later of his wounds.

For further activities on the Western Front he was awarded the Military Cross (MC) and later achieved the rank of lieutenant colonel, having been commissioned as a second lieutenant in July 1915.

Daniels was a Freemason and was initiated into Aldershot Camp Lodge No. 1331 on 24 April 1920.

His VC is displayed at the Royal Green Jackets (Rifles) Museum at Winchester, England. He died having no children.

A road is named for him in his home town, Wymondham.

== Bibliography ==
- Batchelor, Peter; Matson, Christopher (2011). The Western Front 1915. VCs of the First World War. The History Press. ISBN 978-0-7524-6057-4.
