= Cecil Noble =

Cecil Reginald Noble
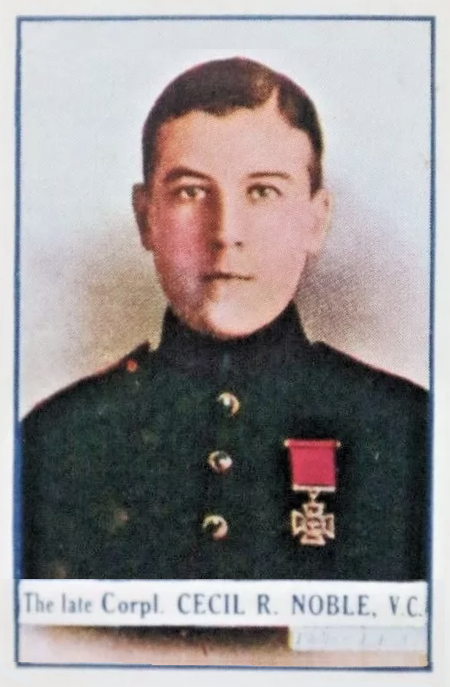
- Noble depicted on a cigarette card
- Born: 4 June 1891; Bournemouth, Hampshire, England
- Died: 13 March 1915 (aged 23); Neuve Chapelle, France
- Burial place: Longuenesse Souvenir Cemetery, France
- Military career
- Allegiance: United Kingdom
- Branch: British Army
- Service years: 1914−1915 †
- Rank: Lance Corporal
- Units: Rifle Brigade (The Prince Consort's Own)
- Conflicts: World War I
- Awards: Victoria Cross

Lance Corporal Cecil Reginald Noble VC (4 June 1891 − 13 March 1915) was a British Army soldier and a posthumous English recipient of the Victoria Cross (VC), the highest and most prestigious award for gallantry in the face of the enemy that can be awarded to British and Commonwealth forces. He was killed at the Battle of Neuve Chapelle during the First World War.

Noble was born in Bournemouth, then part of Hampshire, the son of Frederick Noble, a decorator, and his wife Hannah, née Smith. The family lived in Capstone Road and he attended St Clement's Elementary School, and followed his father in working as a decorator. He disliked his given forename and was known by friends and family as Tommy.

He enlisted in the Rifle Brigade, British Army, in 1910. When he was 23 years old, and an acting Corporal in the 2nd Battalion, The Rifle Brigade, on the Western Front the following deed took place for which he was posthumously awarded the Victoria Cross.

On 12 March 1915 at Neuve Chapelle, France, when the advance of the battalion was impeded by wire entanglements and by very severe machine-gun fire, Corporal Noble and another man (Harry Daniels) voluntarily rushed in front and succeeded in cutting the wires. They were both wounded, and Corporal Noble later died of his injuries. Daniels survived to receive his Victoria Cross and later rose to the rank of lieutenant-colonel.

Noble was buried at Longuenesse Souvenir Cemetery, two miles south of Saint-Omer, France, in plot I, row A, grave 57.

== Blue Plaque ==
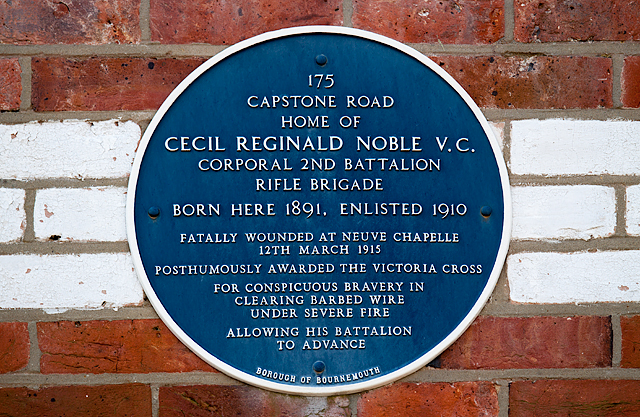
Bournemouth Blue Plaque

Noble is commemorated by a Blue Plaque in Capstone Road, Bournemouth, unveiled on 2 October 1995. The plaque gives Noble's rank as Corporal, in line with the VC citation published in the London Gazette of 28 April 1915, but differing from the rank of Lance-Corporal, as used on his Commonwealth War Grave headstone. The plaque was erected at the same time as one to Frederick Charles Riggs VC, also in Capstone Road. Noble and Riggs are also commemorated on WWI centenary paving slabs by Bournemouth's War Memorial in the Central Pleasure Gardens, and by neighbouring street names in the Wallisdown area of Bournemouth.

His VC is not publicly held.

== Bibliography ==
- Monuments to Courage (David Harvey, 1999)
- Buzzell, Nora, ed. (1997). The Register of the Victoria Cross. Cheltenham: This England Alma House. ISBN 0-906324-27-0.
- Batchelor, Peter F.; Matson, Christopher (2012). VCs of the First World War: Western Front 1915. The History Press. ISBN 978-0752460574.
