= General Coffin =

General Coffin may refer to:

- Clifford Coffin (1870–1959), British Army major general
- Isaac Coffin (1801–1872), East India Company major general
- Timothy R. Coffin (fl. 1980s–2010s), U.S. Army brigadier general
