= 25th Infantry Brigade (United Kingdom) =

25th Brigade 25th Infantry Brigade
- Active: 5 October 1914 – 20 March 1919; 1 November 1939 – 31 August 1944
- Country: United Kingdom
- Branch: British Army
- Type: Infantry
- Size: Brigade
- Part of: 8th Division; 50th (Northumbrian) Infantry Division; 47th (London) Infantry Division
- Engagements: First World War Battle of Neuve Chapelle Battle of Aubers Ridge Battle of the Somme Battle of Passchendaele Second Battle of the Somme Second Battle of Arras (1918) Second World War Battle of St Omer-La Bassée

Commanders
- Notable commanders: Reginald Byng Stephens; Clifford Coffin VC; William Havelock Ramsden

The 25th Infantry Brigade was a war-formed infantry brigade of the British Army that saw active service during both the First and the Second World Wars.

The 25th Brigade was formed in October 1914 just after the outbreak of the First World War with battalions withdrawn from overseas garrisons. It formed part of the 8th Division and served with it on the Western Front until the end of the war, in particular taking part in the Battle of Neuve Chapelle, the Battle of the Somme and the Battle of Passchendaele. It was disbanded in March 1919.

The brigade was reformed in November 1939 just after the outbreak of the Second World War. It saw action during the battles of France and Belgium in May 1940, predominantly with the 50th (Northumbrian) Infantry Division. After being evacuated at Dunkirk, it remained in the United Kingdom with the 47th (London) Infantry Division until it was disbanded at the end of August 1944.

== First World War ==
The 25th Brigade came into existence on 5 October 1914 (first commanding officer appointed) as part of the 8th Division shortly after the outbreak of the First World War. It was formed with four regular infantry battalions brought back to the United Kingdom from various overseas garrisons: 2nd Lincolnshire Regiment from Bermuda, 2nd Royal Berkshire Regiment from Jhansi, India, 1st Royal Irish Rifles from Aden, and 2nd Rifle Brigade from Kuldana, Murree, India. The brigade concentrated at Hursley Park near Winchester and on 5 and 6 November 1914 it landed at Le Havre. It remained on the Western Front with the 8th Division for the rest of the war.

The brigade saw action at the battles of Neuve-Chapelle (Moated Grange Attack, 18 December 1914), Neuve Chapelle again (10–13 March 1915), Aubers Ridge (9 May 1915), when the brigade commander, Brigadier-General Lowry Cole was killed, and Bois-Grenier (25 September 1915), a diversionary attack for the Battle of Loos.

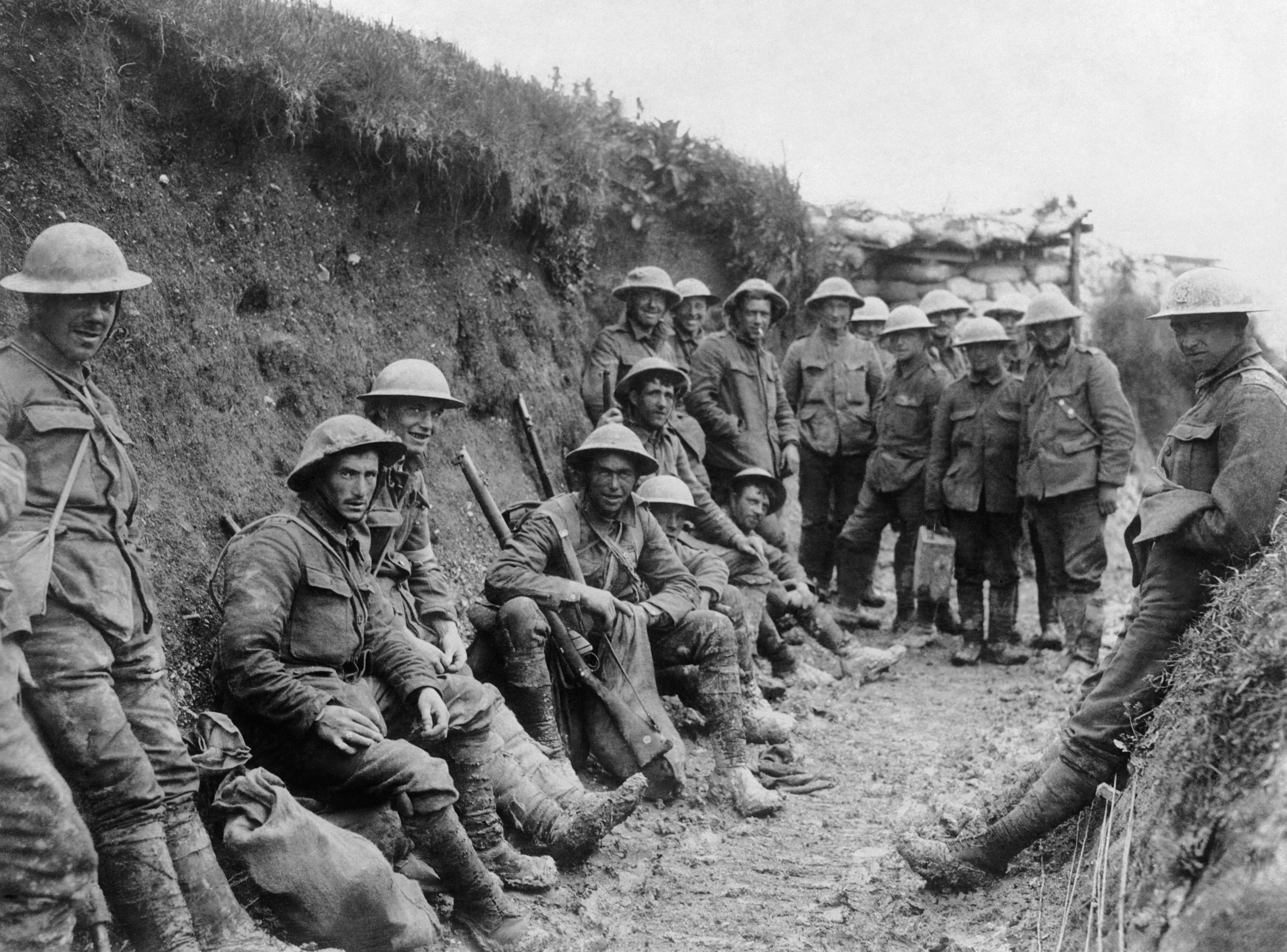
Infantrymen of the 1st Battalion, Royal Irish Rifles, during the Battle of the Somme, July 1916.

In early 1916, the brigade gained a trench mortar battery and a machine gun company. It then fought on the Somme, notably the Battle of Albert on the first day and the attack on Le Transloy on 23–30 October 1916.

In 1917, the brigade took part in operations to follow the Germans in their retreat to the Hindenburg Line (14 March–5 April). It then took part in the Third Battle of Ypres, notable the Battle of Pilckem Ridge (31 July–1 August), the Attack on Westhoek (31 July) where the brigade commander, Brigadier-General Clifford Coffin, won the Victoria Cross, and the Battle of Langemarck (16–18 August).

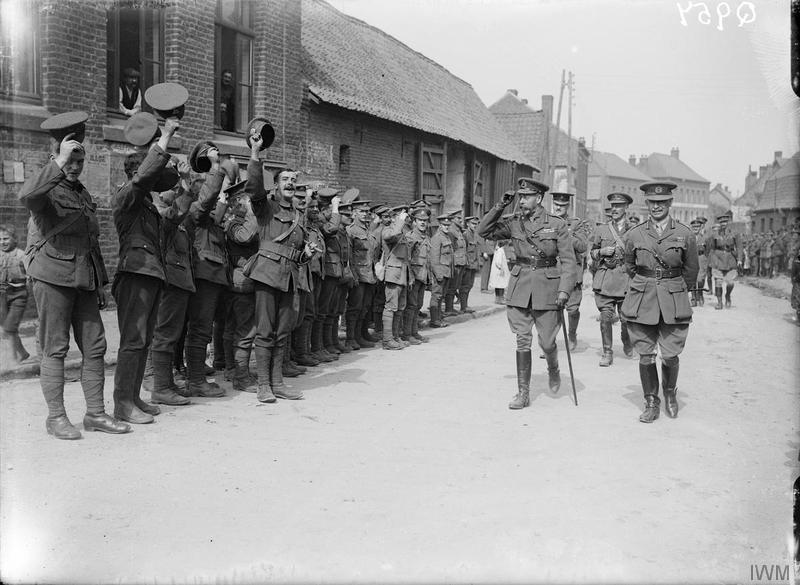
King George V with Major-General Havelock Hudson (commanding 8th Division) walking through the streets of Fouquereuil, where the King was cheered by men of the 25th Brigade, 11 August 1916.

The brigade's machine gun company was moved to the divisional 8th Battalion, Machine Gun Corps on 20 January 1918. In addition, British (Note: As distinct from the Australian, Canadian and the New Zealand divisions which remained on a 12-battalion basis.) divisions on the Western Front were reduced from a 12-battalion to a 9-battalion basis in February 1918 and the brigade from four to three battalions. Thereafter, the brigade commanded three infantry battalions and a trench mortar battery. 1918 saw the return of the war of movement. It had to withstand the German spring offensive in the First Battles of the Somme – Battle of St Quentin (23 March), Actions at the Somme Crossings (24 and 25 March), Battle of Rosieres (26 and 27 March), and Action of Villers-Bretonneux (24 and 25 April) – and the Third Battle of the Aisne (27 May–6 June). It then switched over to counter-attack in the Second Battle of Arras (Battle of the Scarpe, 26–30 August) and the Final Advance in Artois in which the 8th Division captured Douai (17 October).

By the time of the armistice of 11 November 1918, the brigade was Pommeroeul (fr), west of Mons. On 16 November it moved back to Tournai and by 18 December had completed a move to the Ath–Enghien area. Here the division commenced demobilization, a process that was completed on 20 March 1919.

=== Order of battle ===
The brigade commanded the following units during the war:

- 2nd Battalion, Lincolnshire Regiment – left on 3 February 1918 for 62nd Brigade, 21st Division
- 2nd Battalion, Princess Charlotte of Wales's (Royal Berkshire Regiment)
- 1st Battalion, Royal Irish Rifles – left on 3 February 1918 for 107th Brigade, 36th (Ulster) Division
- 2nd Battalion, Rifle Brigade (Prince Consort's Own)
- 1/13th (County of London) Battalion, London Regiment (Kensington) – joined from England on 13 November 1914; to GHQ Troops on 20 May 1915
- 1/1st (City of London) Battalion, London Regiment – joined from England on 14 May 1915; left on 8 February 1916 for 167th (1st London) Brigade, 56th (1st London) Division
- 1/8th Battalion, Duke of Cambridge's Own (Middlesex Regiment) – joined on 27 August 1915 from 23rd Brigade, 8th Division; left on 23 October 1915 for 70th Brigade, 8th Division (Note: 1/8th Battalion, Duke of Cambridge's Own (Middlesex Regiment) originally served with 85th Brigade, 28th Division. It joined the 8th Division on 21 June 1916 when it was amalgamated with the 1/7th Middlesex in 23rd Brigade. It resumed its separate identity on 2 August before joining 25th Brigade. It subsequently transferred to 167th (1st London) Brigade, 56th (1st London) Division on 8 February 1916.)
- 25th Machine Gun Company – formed 19 January 1916; formed part of 8th Battalion, Machine Gun Corps from 20 January 1918
- 25th Trench Mortar Battery – formed in February 1916
- 2nd Battalion, East Lancashire Regiment – joined on 3 February 1918 from 24th Brigade, 8th Division

== Second World War ==
The 25th Infantry Brigade was formed in the United Kingdom on 1 November 1939, shortly after the outbreak of the Second World War. It was formed with three Territorial Army (TA) infantry battalions transferred from existing TA formations: the 4th Buffs (Royal East Kent Regiment) from 133rd Infantry Brigade, 44th (Home Counties) Infantry Division, the 4th Border Regiment from 126th Infantry Brigade, 42nd (East Lancashire) Infantry Division and the 1st/5th Sherwood Foresters from 148th Infantry Brigade, 49th (West Riding) Infantry Division. Initially under War Office Control, on 18 November it moved to France where it joined the Lines of Communication Troops of the British Expeditionary Force (BEF).

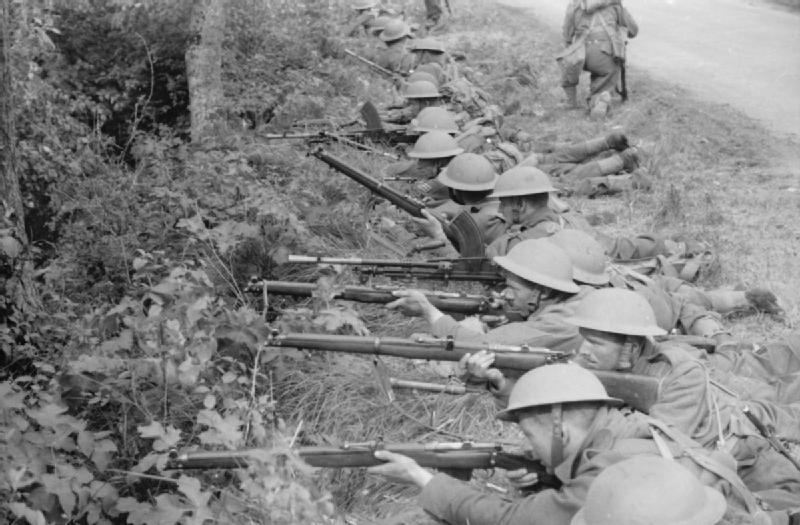
Men of the 4th Battalion, Border Regiment take up defensive positions by the roadside, May 1940.

In May 1940, the brigade was variously assigned to a succession of infantry divisions: 5th (4–9 May), (Note: The brigade joined the 5th Infantry Division to replace the 15th Infantry Brigade which had been deployed to Norway.) 50th (Northumbrian) (9–18 May), (Note: The 50th (Northumbrian) Infantry Division was organized pre-war as a two-brigade motor division. The brigade joined to bring it up to the three-brigade standard of an infantry division.) 3rd (18–19 May), back to the 50th (19–21 May), 46th (21–26 May) and finally to the 2nd (26–31 May). The brigade saw action at the Battle of St Omer-La Bassée (23–29 May) before it was evacuated at Dunkirk on 31 May 1940.

On return to the United Kingdom, the brigade joined the 47th (London) Infantry Division. It remained with the division in the United Kingdom for the rest of its existence, being disbanded on 31 August 1944.

=== Order of battle ===
The brigade commanded the following units during the war:

- 4th Battalion, Buffs (Royal East Kent Regiment) – from 1 November 1939 to 3 May 1940; 2 July to 28 October 1940
- 4th (Westmorland) Battalion, Border Regiment – from 1 November 1939 to 3 May 1940; 2 July 1940 to 5 January 1941
- 1/5th Battalion, Sherwood Foresters – from 1 November 1939 to 3 May 1940
- 1/7th Battalion, Queen's Royal Regiment (West Surrey) – from 4 May to 28 June 1940
- 2nd Battalion, Essex Regiment – from 4 May 1940 to 29 February 1944
- 1st Battalion, Royal Irish Fusiliers – from 4 May to 26 June 1940
- 25th Infantry Brigade Anti-Tank Company – formed 8 July 1940, disbanded 28 November 1941
- 9th Battalion, King's Own Royal Regiment (Lancaster) – from 27 November 1940 to 1 December 1942
- 12th Battalion, South Staffordshire Regiment – from 11 December 1940 to 14 November 1941
- 19th Battalion, Royal Fusiliers – from 2 January to 24 September 1942
- 20th Battalion, Royal Fusiliers – from 2 January to 10 September 1942
- 30th Battalion, King's Own Yorkshire Light Infantry – from 10 to 26 September 1942 (Note: The 30th Battalion, King's Own Yorkshire Light Infantry was redesignated as the 6th Battalion.)
- 11th Battalion, York and Lancaster Regiment – from 24 September to 16 December 1942
- 6th Battalion, King's Own Yorkshire Light Infantry – from 27 September to 13 December 1942
- 1st Battalion, Duke of Cornwall's Light Infantry – from 13 December 1942 to 16 July 1944
- 9th Battalion, Royal Norfolk Regiment – from 16 December 1942 to 14 August 1944
- 7th Battalion, North Staffordshire Regiment – from 5 March to 16 July 1944

== Commanders ==
The 25th Brigade had the following commanders during the First World War:

From	Rank	Name	Notes
5 October 1914	Brigadier-General	A.W.G. Lowry Cole	killed 9 May 1915
9 May 1915	Brigadier-General	R.B. Stephens	
1 April 1916	Brigadier-General	J.H.W. Pollard	
4 September 1916	Lieutenant-Colonel	R.C. Haig	temporary
11 September 1916	Brigadier-General	J.H.W. Pollard	
11 January 1917	Brigadier-General	C. Coffin	won the Victoria Cross on 31 July 1917; to temporary command of the 50th (Northumbrian) Division on 23 February 1918
23 February 1918	Lieutenant-Colonel	A.H.S. Hart-Synnot	acting; sick on 10 March 1918
10 March 1918	Lieutenant-Colonel	R.H. Husey	acting
17 March 1918	Brigadier-General	C. Coffin VC	
4 May 1918	Lieutenant-Colonel	G.E.M. Hill	acting
8 May 1918	Brigadier-General	R.H. Husey	wounded and captured on 27 May 1918; died of wounds on 30 May 1918
29 May 1918	Major	H.P. Allaway	acting
3 June 1918	Brigadier-General	J.B. Pollock-McCall	
7 October 1918	Brigadier-General	Hon. R.Brand	

The 25th Infantry Brigade had the following commanders during the Second World War:

From	Rank	Name	Notes
1 November 1939	Brigadier	W.H.O. Ramsden	
1 December 1940	Lieutenant-Colonel	A.H. Blest	acting
10 December 1940	Brigadier	W.H.O. Ramsden	
12 December 1940	Lieutenant-Colonel	A.H. Blest	acting
2 January 1941	Brigadier	E.T.L. Gurdon	
26 March 1941	Brigadier	A.H. Blest	

== See also ==
- British infantry brigades of the First World War
- British brigades of the Second World War

== Bibliography ==
- Becke, Archibald F. (1935). Order of Battle of Divisions Part 1–The Regular British Divisions. London: HMSO. OCLC 4405016.
- Bellis, Malcolm A. (1994). Regiments of the British Army 1939–1945 (Armour & Infantry). London: Military Press International. ISBN 0-85420-999-9.
- James, Brigadier E.A. (1978). British Regiments 1914–18. London: Samson Books Limited. ISBN 0-906304-03-2.
- Joslen, H. F. (2003) [1960]. Orders of Battle: Second World War, 1939–1945. Uckfield, East Sussex: Naval and Military Press. ISBN 978-1-84342-474-1.
- Petre, F. Loraine (2009) [1925]. Royal Berkshire Regiment 1914–1918. Uckfield, East Sussex: The Naval & Military Press. ISBN 1-847349-75-7.
