= Roland Haig =

British Army general

Brigadier-General Roland Haig DSO**
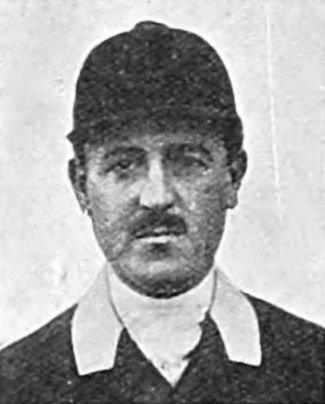
- Roland Haig in c. 1924
- Born: 1 February 1873; Kensington, London
- Died: 28 February 1953 (aged 80); Drumnadrochit, Inverness-shire
- Relatives: Douglas Haig (cousin)
- Military career
- Allegiance: United Kingdom
- Branch: British Army
- Service years: 1890–1891, 1894–1923
- Rank: Brigadier-General
- Commands: 8th Division mounted troops III Corps Cyclist Battalion; 2nd Battalion, Royal Berkshire Regiment; 25th Infantry Brigade; 24th Infantry Brigade; 5th Cyclist Brigade; No. 1 Sub-District, Midland District, Irish Command
- Conflicts: Second Boer War; First World War
- Awards: Distinguished Service Order & 2 Bars; Mentioned in dispatches x 6

Brigadier-General Roland Charles Haig DSO & Two Bars (1 February 1873 – 28 February 1953) was a British Army officer who served in the Second Boer War and First World War. After a brief period of service in the militia, Haig joined the 16th Lancers in 1894. He served with them until 1899 when he joined the 7th Dragoon Guards, being promoted to captain in the following year. He served in the Orange Free State and Transvaal in the Second Boer War, including fighting at the Battle of Diamond Hill. In 1903 Haig retired from the army, joining the Imperial Yeomanry. He transferred to the Rifle Brigade in 1907, where he was promoted to major. Haig began his service in the First World War in the 1st Battalion of that regiment.

Haig became second in command of the 2nd Battalion of the South Staffordshire Regiment in January 1915, moving in the same position to the 2nd Battalion of the Rifle Brigade in April. From May 1915 to May 1916 Haig commanded a division of mounted troops in 8th Division, before briefly commanding the III Corps Cyclist Battalion. In June he was given command of the 2nd Battalion of the Royal Berkshire Regiment, with which he fought in the Battle of the Somme and Battle of Passchendaele, in the latter of which he was wounded in late July 1917. Haig returned to service in October and in November was promoted to brigadier-general and given command of the 24th Infantry Brigade. He commanded the brigade during the German spring offensive. On 27 May 1918, during the Third Battle of the Aisne, Haig's headquarters was attacked and overrun by a German attack. He was heavily gassed but managed to escape. His injuries from the gas attack forced him to resign his command, and he saw no further service in the war. Haig retired from the army in 1923 and died at Drumnadrochit, Inverness-shire, at the age of 80.

== Early life ==
Roland Charles Haig was born in Kensington, London, on 1 February 1873, the son of the barrister and justice of the peace Charles Edwin Haig of Pen-Ithon, Radnorshire, and his wife Janet née Stein, whose family were the Haigs of Cameron House. He was a cousin of the future Field Marshal Douglas Haig. Haig was educated at Winchester College.

== Military career ==
=== Early service ===
Haig's first military service came on 6 September 1890 when he was commissioned as a second lieutenant in the 3rd (Militia) Battalion of the South Wales Borderers. He only served briefly in the militia, resigning his commission on 4 March 1891. Haig was later trained at the Royal Military College, Sandhurst, from which he passed out in 1894 to join the 16th Lancers. He did so on 14 November, becoming a second lieutenant. He served in the 16th Lancers until 1899, transferring to the 7th Dragoon Guards as a lieutenant on 4 October. He was then promoted to captain on 17 January 1900.

=== Second Boer War ===
The 7th Dragoon Guards arrived at Southampton on 2 February to travel to South Africa for service in the Second Boer War. Haig departed on board SS Norseman on the following day, disembarking at Cape Town on 3 March.

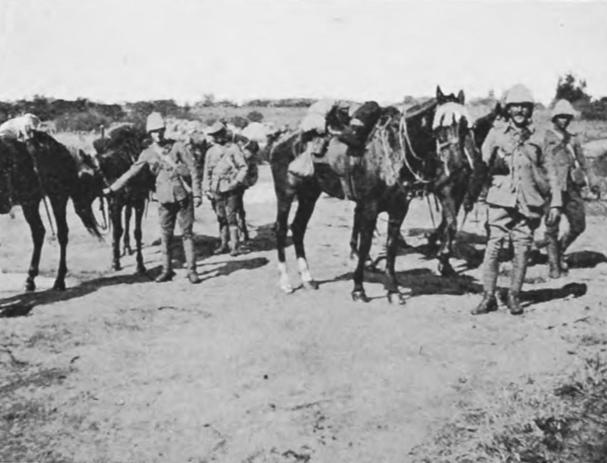
Haig (front right) leads his squadron across the Vaal River on 24 May 1900

Haig served in operations in the Orange Free State from April. He was part of a force attacking Thaba 'Nchu on 27 April, during which the regiment was harassed by rifle fire. When another captain was injured, Haig escorted him to an ambulance which was then also attacked, forcing the officer to roll underneath it. Haig began to ride back to his squadron, and whilst galloping under fire he came across a soldier whose horse had been shot. He gave his own to the man and finished the journey at a run, waving his helmet towards the Boers to signify that they were missing him. On 24 May the regiment crossed the Vaal River into the Transvaal. Fighting around the Klip River on 29 May, Haig saved another soldier whose horse had been shot, riding through artillery and rifle fire to rescue him. Haig participated in the captures of Johannesburg on 31 May and Pretoria on 5 June, and then fought at the Battle of Diamond Hill between 11 and 12 June. During later parts of the war he was attached to the 3rd Provision Regiment of Dragoons, and was subsequently an adjutant of the Cavalry Depot until early 1903.

For his service in the war, Haig received the Queen's South Africa Medal with clasps for Cape Colony, Orange River Colony, Johannesburg, and Diamond Hill.

After the end of the war, Haig returned home to the United Kingdom, and on 10 October 1903 he retired from the army, still a captain, to instead join the Imperial Yeomanry. This came about because of the results of a serious hunting accident that left him unable to continue in the regular army. Within the Yeomanry, Haig joined the Royal Bucks Hussars. For 1907 he also took up the role of master of the Radnorshire & West Herefordshire Hunt.

=== First World War ===
In April 1907 Haig transferred as a captain to the 7th (Militia) Battalion of the Rifle Brigade, the regiment's special reserve. He was promoted to major in the 6th Battalion of the Rifle Brigade on 5 August 1914, a day after the British entry into World War I, and then transferred to the 1st Battalion of that regiment, and it was with this battalion that he travelled to France to fight in the First World War. In January 1915 he was made second-in-command of the 2nd Battalion of the South Staffordshire Regiment, which was in action at Cuinchy on 1 and 6 February. Haig was awarded the Distinguished Service Order (DSO) for his service on 18 February. He stayed with the South Staffords until April of the same year. Haig then moved to serve as second-in-command of the 2nd Battalion of the Rifle Brigade until May, when he was given command of a division of mounted troops within 8th Division. On 9 May 8th Division fought in the Battle of Aubers.

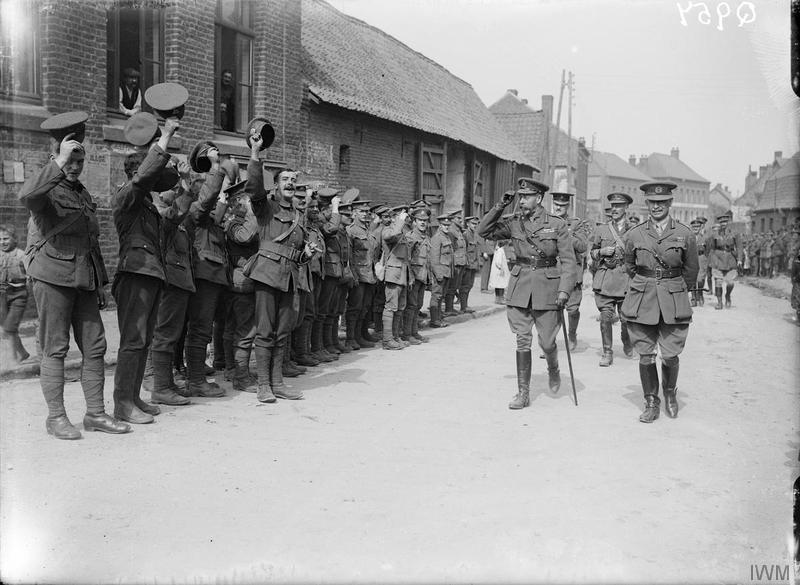
Men of the 25th Infantry Brigade, in which Haig commanded a battalion, in August 1916

Haig commanded his mounted troops until May 1916 when he was made commander of the III Corps Cyclist Battalion, which he commanded for only one month. In late June Haig took part in the preparations for the Battle of the Somme, going to the front lines to ascertain the condition of the barbed wire in front of the German positions, and advising that more be done with artillery to cut it. He was then promoted to lieutenant colonel on 4 July and on the same day given command of the 2nd Battalion of the Royal Berkshire Regiment in the 25th Infantry Brigade of 8th Division. The battalion had lost all its senior officers in the first day on the Somme, with a second lieutenant left in command.

==== Le Transloy ====
The battalion spent the following two weeks behind the lines at Allouagne, reorganising the unit and absorbing new drafts of soldiers. It returned to the front line a week later, based in the old coalfields to the north of Loos. The battalion spent most of its time in reserve; between 4 September and 11 September Haig was in temporary command of the brigade. Haig's battalion was relieved from the front on 10 October, and two days later the Berkshires were moved, along with the rest of the division, back to the Somme. The battalion arrived at Doullens on 16 October, went into reserve on 19 October, and went into the front lines on 22 October. Haig's battalion then fought at the Battle of Le Transloy on 23 October, serving in support of the centre of the brigade's line, in an attempt to capture a strong series of German trenches covering Le Transloy and Beaulencourt.

Map of the position of 8th Division at Le Transloy on 23 October, showing Haig's battalion towards the centre of the image

After suffering high numbers of casualties from artillery bombardment, Haig began to send his companies forward to reinforce the attacking battalions. The German trench facing them was heavily defended and was still holding at nightfall, when Haig called off further attacks. At 3:50 a.m. on 24 October the Berkshires went in the first wave of a new attack on the trench (named "Zenith"), but the mud hindered them and they retreated under heavy rifle and machine gun fire at 4:30 a.m. The battalion stayed in the line until 26 October when they were relieved. 8th Division was placed in reserve on 2 November, being criticised for failing to capture Zenith trench.

==== Bouchavesnes ====
Haig's battalion reorganised itself at Metigny between 20 November and 27 December, and 8th Division returned to the front line on 23 January 1917, based near Sailly-Saillisel. The Berkshires were taking over trenches at Rancourt previously garrisoned by the French, and spent much of February upgrading their defences and general infrastructure in the trenches. Pencilled in to make an attack at Bouchavesnes-Bergen which was intended to help push the general advance forwards, the division went into reserve on 11 February to practice for the attack. They returned on 21 February and attacked in the early morning of 4 March, with the Berkshires in the front of the 25th Brigade's attack. The aim was to capture an important piece of high ground that overlooked Bouchavesnes, defended by two levels of trenches. The battalion captured the first of these with very minimal casualties, and quickly moved on to the second trench which was also captured, with all objectives completed by 6:30 am.

At around 8 a.m. German counter attacks began, and communications with the attack began to deteriorate. Haig therefore went forward himself at 5:30 pm, organising men to fill gaps in the front line between established units. Having ensured that the newly captured ground could be held, he returned to his headquarters. The Berkshires successfully defeated the German counter attacks and by 6 March the area was secure; Haig's battalion was relieved on the same day. In reserve they received the congratulations of the Commander-in-Chief, Douglas Haig.

==== Advance to the Hindenburg Line ====
The British began to advance when the Germans retreated to the Hindenburg Line soon afterwards, and the Berkshires moved up to Hennois Wood on 26 March. The retreating Germans left behind a rearguard at Sorel-le-Grand nearby, and on 30 March the battalion attacked the position, successfully capturing it while seeing very little of the enemy. Continuing the advance, on 4 April the battalion launched an attack in conjunction with 20th Division on Gouzeaucourt Wood, near Metz-en-Couture. The battalion attacked through heavy snow with artillery support and successfully assaulted the German positions, and by daybreak Haig was able to go forward and establish defences on the edge of the wood. Haig was especially pleased with the attack, writing that the loss of twenty men killed was "not excessive, considering the difficulty of the attack, the snow, and the amount of ground gained". The battalion was relieved in the night of 5 April.

The following two weeks saw the Berkshires in reserve, helping to clear roads of obstacles; the Germans had attempted to destroy and block the routes of advance that the British might have used. Haig's battalion returned to the front on 16 April in Gauche Wood near Villers-Guislain, which was still held by the Germans. On 18 April Haig was detailed to support an assault on the village by another brigade, and he sent out parties of machine gunners to assist in such. By 7:30 a.m. the village had been captured, and Haig's units had joined up with the attacking force having suffered very light casualties. The battalion was relieved later in the day to rest at Heudicourt. After this the Germans fully retreated to the Hindenburg Line, and the British advance faltered. 8th Division was moved from the Somme to go to Belgium.

==== Ypres ====
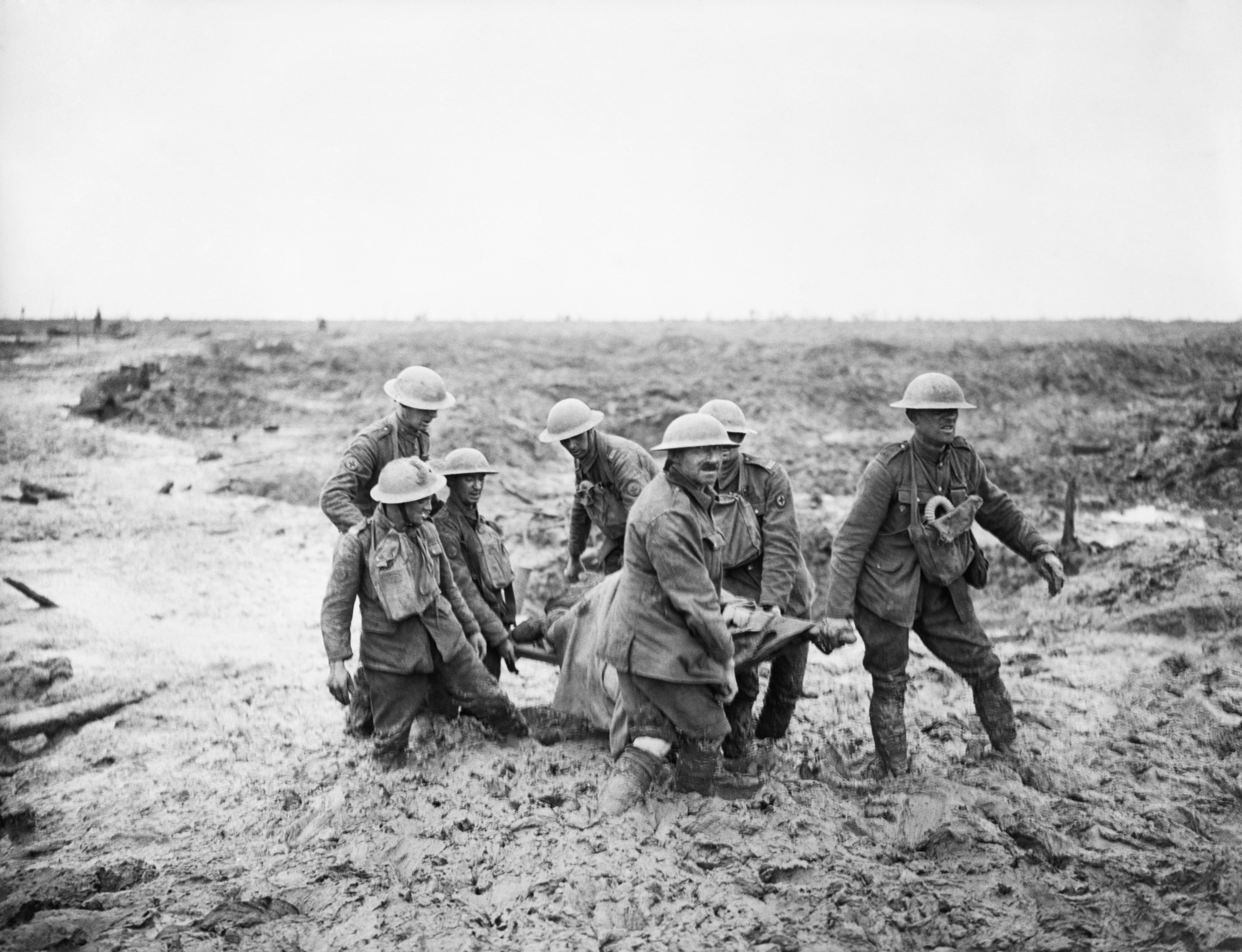
Stretcher bearers work in the mud during the Battle of Pilckem Ridge, at which Haig was wounded

Having spent the intervening period in reserve and in supporting a small attack on Gonnelieu, Haig's battalion spent June billeted in Hazebrouck and Caestre while training. He received a bar to his DSO on 18 June. The citation read:

For conspicuous gallantry and devotion to duty when in command of his battalion during an attack on the enemy's position. The success of this attack was due to the ability and energy with which he trained his battalion, made his preparations and handled the troops under his command during the battle.

The Berkshires entered Ypres on 5 July, serving in dugouts under the walls of the city. They entered the trenches a day later, but after an uneventful few days the battalion was taken out of the line for rest between 9–10 July. One company stayed behind for a night raid on Hooge on 11 July. Haig led this raid, made up of 168 men, entering the German trenches at around 1 a.m. and destroying a hastily set up enemy machine gun position. The raid was finished in forty-four minutes, having captured one prisoner and killed between seventy and eighty enemy soldiers. Haig wrote that "all things considered, the attack went very well, though there was some wavering when the enemy threw bombs, which they did from dugouts and shelters".

The battalion was afterwards sent to Tournehem, where they began training for the Battle of Passchendaele. They returned to the front on 24 July, and the Battle of Pilckem Ridge began on 31 July. 25th Brigade was tasked with staying in reserve as the rest of the division attacked a line of trenches between Westhoek and the ruins of the Hooge railway station. The Berkshires were in reserve for this operation, tasked with leap-frogging the rest of the brigade once it had achieved its objectives and continuing the advance. At 7:50 a.m. the battalion began to move up as planned, with Haig having gone to confer with Brigadier-General Clifford Coffin, the commander of the brigade.

Haig left the battalion under the command of his adjutant with whom they advanced until pinned down by counter attacks and heavy return fire, with units on the flanks of 8th Division failing to make the headway required to support it. (Note: The battalion stayed in the line in very muddy and poor conditions, relieving other units that had been heavily engaged. They in turn were relieved late on 1 August, having lost twenty-seven men killed and 108 wounded, including Haig.) Haig never returned to his battalion, as some time early on in the day he was wounded by a bullet in the right thigh and evacuated to the rear. He was relieved of his command and sent home to recover.

=== 24th Infantry Brigade ===
Haig returned to the Western Front in October and on 21 November was promoted to brigadier-general as commander of the 24th Infantry Brigade, also part of 8th Division. Major-General William Heneker had promoted him to replace the previous commanding officer of the brigade, who Heneker thought was "not very satisfactory". Military historian J. M. Bourne praises the appointment, describing Haig as "a man of great courage and leadership". The brigade was made up of the 1st Battalions of the Worcestershire Regiment and Sherwood Foresters, and the 2nd Battalions of the East Lancashire Regiment and Northamptonshire Regiment. (Note: In early January 1918 brigades were reformed so that they would have three rather than four battalions, and Haig's brigade lost the East Lancashires to the 25th Infantry Brigade.)

==== German spring offensive ====
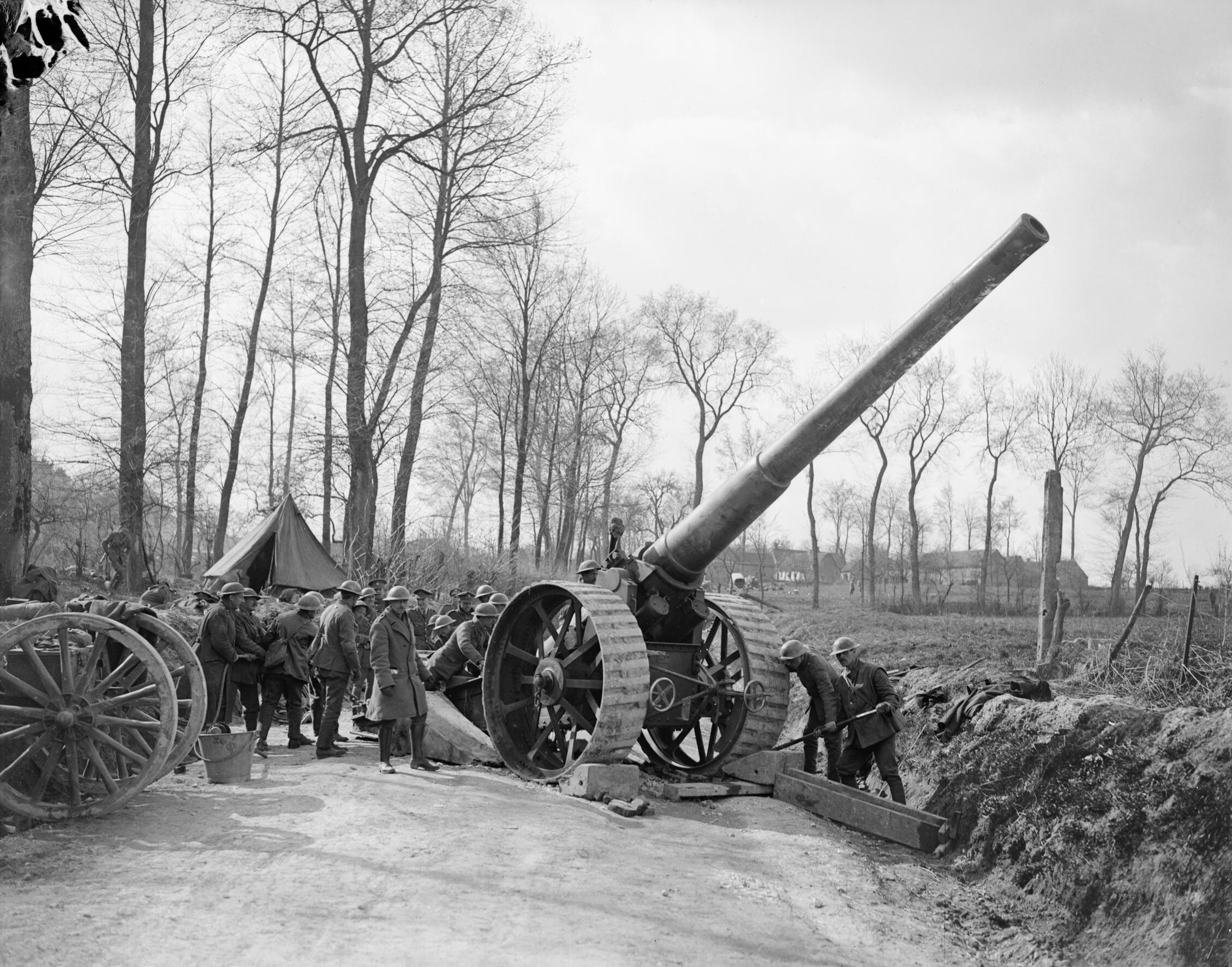
Royal Garrison Artillery gun firing during the Battle of Rosieres

He was promoted to brevet lieutenant colonel in January 1918. The brigade entered the front line, having been in a period of rest and training, on 25 December, at Passchendaele. The brigade was then brought into action to defend against the German spring offensive in March 1918, being the first part of the division to reach their positions near Eterpigny on 23 March. The position was attacked heavily as part of Operation Michael, and by 25 March Haig had been forced to partially withdraw, making his new headquarters at Ablaincourt. 8th Division was given a line to defend between Chaulnes and Estrées, which was attacked in force by the Germans on 26 March. The division, with 24th Brigade one of two in the front line, repulsed the attack with heavy losses, but was forced to continue retreating because they were at risk of being cut off from the rest of the army, which had moved further back. The division moved to a line near Rosieres, where it was heavily attacked at 8 a.m. on 27 March. The Germans managed to penetrate the right of the division's line, but were pushed back in a counter-attack by Haig's Sherwood Foresters, after which the front around them stabilised.

Despite this the division was again at risk of being cut off because of failures to hold in other parts of the army, and on 28 March they fell back to between Vrely and Caix. Having left for the new line at 3:30 am, Haig was forced to retreat again later in the day when the German advance reached Caix. His brigade was then billeted at Moreuil, described by the divisional history as "now so utterly exhausted that they were quite unfit to move". The next day Haig's brigade was split from 8th Division and sent north to reinforce 24th Division at Berteaucourt, but soon returned to 8th Division where it replaced the Canadian cavalry that had fought the Battle of Moreuil Wood on 30 March. Haig's brigade was relieved in the morning of 2 April, going to rest at Cavillon near Amiens.

==== Villers-Bretonneux ====
Haig's brigade returned to the front line on 20 April, north of Villers-Bretonneux which was where the German advance had been halted. On the morning of 24 April the Germans launched an attack on the British positions that became the Second Battle of Villers-Bretonneux. By midday the Germans had successfully pushed the British out of the village, but British successes to their flanks meant that the new defenders of the village were surrounded, with the original British front line being restored at 4:30 a.m. on 25 April. Units of 8th Division were sent to clear the village, and by the end of the day had succeeded in this. They were brought out of the line on 27 April.

8th Division had received very high casualties in the aforementioned fighting, and it was one of the divisions subsequently taken out of the line and moved to a quieter sector of the front. They left on 3 May for Champagne, where a confusion with the French commander in the sector meant that the British troops went straight into the front line. 8th Division was placed between La Ville-aux-Bois and Berry-au-Bac.

==== The Aisne and final wounding ====
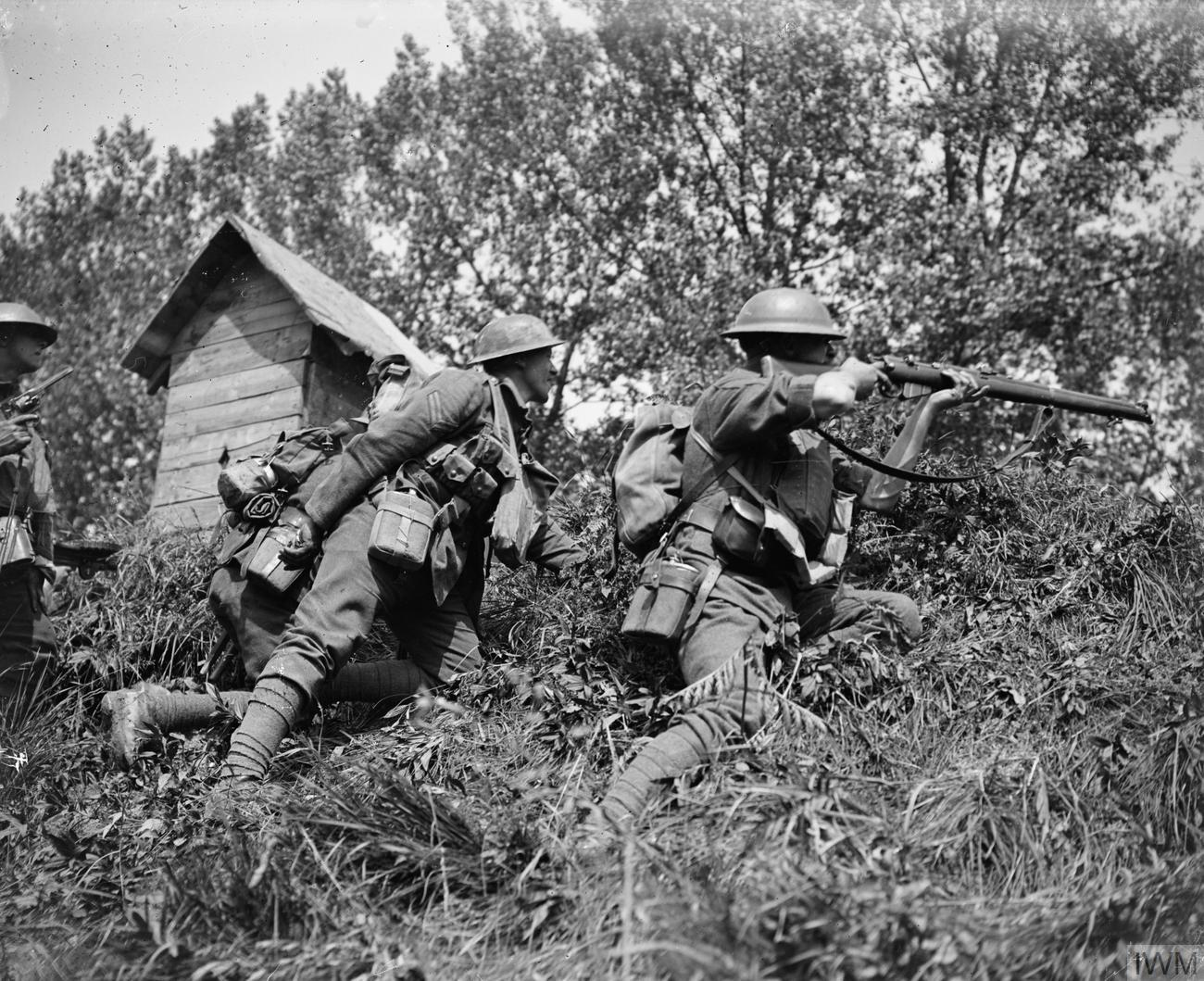
Soldiers of the Worcestershire Regiment during the Third Battle of the Aisne

The British positions were 2,000 yards in front of the River Aisne, a strategic position that the Germans were planning to capture as the next phase in their advance. At 1 a.m. on 27 May the Third Battle of the Aisne began. After a three-hour artillery barrage the German infantry advanced, pushing back 50th Division on the flank of 8th Division, and leaving Haig's brigade exposed. At 6 a.m. his headquarters at Berry-au-Bac was attacked heavily and overrun, and having been gassed in the assault, Haig and his brigade major only narrowly escaped capture. At 9 a.m. the brigade mustered only three officers and sixty-eight men, who were sent to garrison a trench near Roucy. (Note: 8th Division, according to military historian Ian Cull, had "for all practical purposes...ceased to exist".) Haig relinquished his command, due to his gassing and more general exhaustion, on 4 June, having taken no further part in the Battle of the Aisne because of his wounds. He received his second bar to the DSO on 26 July. The citation read:

For conspicuous gallantry and devotion to duty during a long period of active operations. On one occasion, when there was danger of a line giving way, he rode forward, regardless of personal danger, and re-established it. His great courage and untiring energy set a splendid example to all officers and men.

Haig saw no more active service during the war having, as well as his DSOs, been mentioned in dispatches on six occasions. Back in England, he was given command of the 5th Cyclist Brigade in Kent on 21 June.

== Retirement and death ==
Haig continued to command the 5th Cyclist Brigade after the war. He moved to command Number 1 Sub-District in the Midland District of the Irish Command some time after 1919, and continued in that post until 1921. Early that year Haig planned to visit Sudan with Peter Haig-Thomas, chartering a steamship from the Sudanese government for the purpose. The pair cancelled the trip in February. He retired from the army in 1923. In retirement Haig was an avid golfer as a member of St Andrews Golf Club, in which he won several tournaments and was very well thought of. He had two residences; The Vale in Windsor Forest and a town house in St Andrews, and was also a member of the Cavalry Club. He died at Drumnadrochit, Inverness-shire, on 28 February 1953, aged 80.

== Family ==
Haig married Geraldine Dorothy Kerr-Pearse, daughter of the Reverend Beauchamp Kerr-Pearse of Batts Park in Somerset, and granddaughter of the member of parliament Richard Samuel Guinness, on 20 April 1889. Together they had two sons and a daughter. Their eldest son, Rupert, was killed in 1942 while serving in the Royal Air Force.
