= Lowry Cole =

Lowry Cole may refer to:

- Lowry Cole, 4th Earl of Enniskillen (1845–1924), Irish politician
- Arthur Lowry Cole (1860–1915), British Army general
- David Lowry Cole, 6th Earl of Enniskillen (1918–1989), Kenyan politician
- Galbraith Lowry Cole (1772–1842), British Army general
- Galbraith Lowry Egerton Cole (1881–1929), Irish pioneer
- John Lowry Cole (1813–1882), Irish politician
