= Ralph Husey =

British Army officer

Brigadier-General Ralph Husey DSO* MC
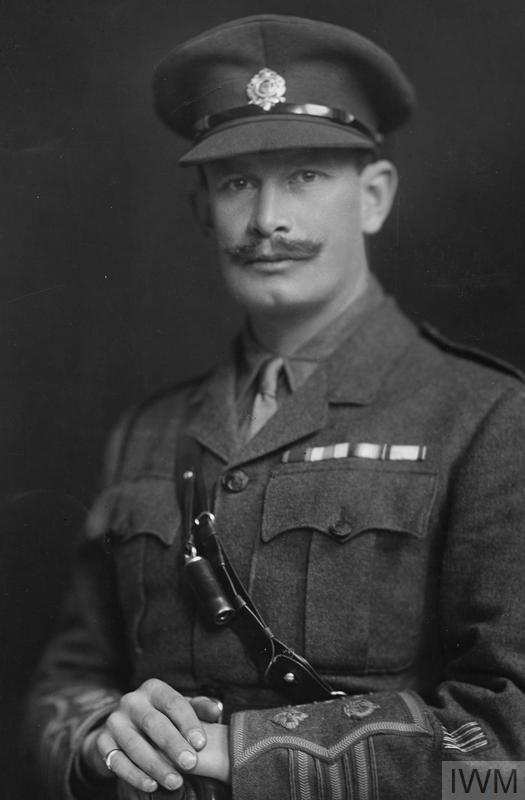
- Born: 25 November 1881
- Died: 30 May 1918 (aged 36); Le Thour, France
- Burial place: Vendresse British Cemetery
- Alma mater: Marlborough College
- Military career
- Allegiance: United Kingdom
- Branch: British Army
- Service years: 1901–1918
- Rank: Brigadier-General
- Commands: 1/London Rifle Brigade; 169th Infantry Brigade; 167th Infantry Brigade; 25th Infantry Brigade
- Conflicts: First World War; Second Battle of Ypres (WIA); Battle of the Somme; Attack on the Gommecourt Salient; Battle of Ginchy; Battle of Flers–Courcelette; Third Battle of Ypres; Battle of Polygon Wood (WIA); German spring offensive; Operation Michael; Third Battle of the Aisne (POW) (DOW)
- Awards: Mentioned in Despatches × 4 Order of Prince Danilo I (Montenegro)

Brigadier-General Ralph Hamer Husey DSO* MC (25 November 1881 – 30 May 1918) was a British Army officer who was killed during the First World War.

Husey died in a German field hospital in Le Thour, France, in May 1918. He had been in command of the 25th Brigade.
