= Reginald Oxley =

British Army officer

Brigadier-General Reginald Oxley CB CMG
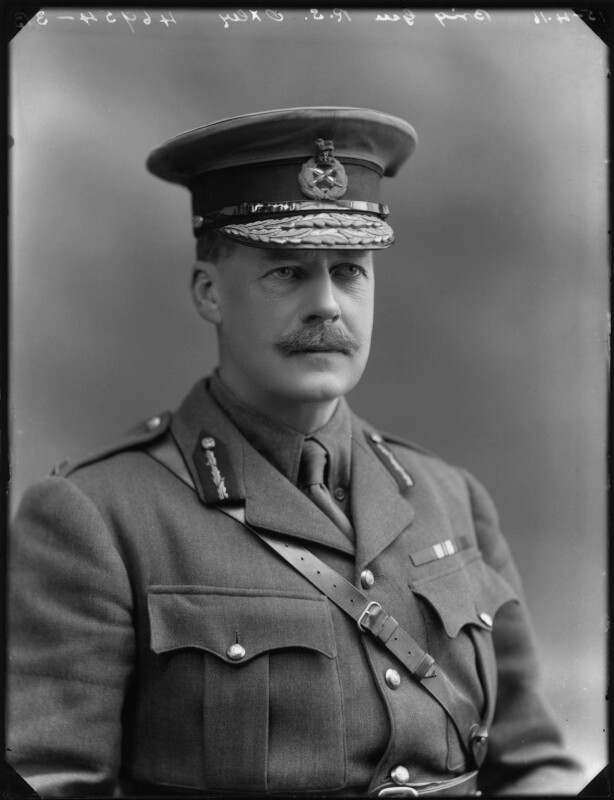
- Oxley in 1916
- Born: 31 December 1861
- Died: 4 October 1951 (aged 89)
- Military career
- Allegiance: United Kingdom
- Branch: British Army
- Service years: 1884–1919
- Rank: Brigadier-General
- Unit: York and Lancaster Regiment
- Commands: 8th Division
- Conflicts: First World War
- Awards: Companion of the Order of the Bath; Companion of the Order of St Michael and St George

Brigadier-General Reginald Stewart Oxley, CB, CMG (31 December 1861 – 4 October 1951) was a British Army officer who commanded the 8th Division on an acting basis during the First World War.

== Military career ==
Born on 31 December 1861, Reginald Stewart Oxley, "the younger son of John Stewart Oxley of Fen Place, Turner's Hill, Sussex" was commissioned into the York and Lancaster Regiment on 23 August 1884 but transferred to the King's Royal Rifle Corps (KRRC) in November.

He saw active service in the Anglo-Manipur War and was granted the rank of captain on 4 August 1893. He attended the Staff College, Camberley, from 1897 to 1898, earning his psc. Among his various contemporaries there was the future field marshal, Sir William Robertson.

He was promoted to major on 26 October 1901 and promoted again to lieutenant colonel on 18 December 1907 and became commanding officer (CO) of the 1st Battalion, KRRC.

On 30 August 1911 he was promoted to colonel and on 18 December that year was placed on half-pay, having relinquished command of the 1st Battalion, KRRC. In May 1912, after returning to normal pay, he succeeded Colonel Edward Perceval as a general staff officer, grade 1 (GSO1), at the Staff College.

He saw action during the First World War and, after having served as a GSO1, was promoted to the temporary rank of brigadier general and took command of a brigade. He later served as commander of the 24th Infantey Brigade from 16 March 1915 to 8 July 1916. He briefly commanded the 8th Division on an acting basis from 27 July 1915 to 1 August 1915. In August 1916 he succeeded Lionel Stopford as a deputy assistant and quartermaster general.

He was appointed a Companion of the Order of the Bath on 14 January 1916 and a Companion of the Order of St Michael and St George (CMG) in the 1919 New Year Honours. Having reverted to colonel and being placed on half-pay, he retired from the army with the honorary rank of brigadier general in November 1919.

== Sources ==
- Becke, Archibald F. (1935). Order of Battle of Divisions Part 1–The Regular British Divisions. London: HMSO. OCLC 4405016.
- Boraston, J. H.; Bax, Cyril E. O. (2001) [1926]. The Eighth Division 1914–1918. Uckfield, East Sussex: Naval & Military Press. ISBN 978-1-84342-189-4.
