= Francis Cunningham Scott =

British Army general

Major-General Sir Francis Cunningham Scott, KCB, KCMG (1834 – 26 June 1902) was a British Army officer who commanded in the Fourth Anglo-Ashanti War in 1895–1896.

== Biography ==
Scott was born in India in 1834, the son of Carteret George Scott, of Malleny House and Garden, Midlothian, by his wife Emily Coffin, daughter of Admiral Francis Holmes Coffin and sister of Isaac Coffin.

He obtained a commission with the 42nd Highlanders in 1852 and was commissioned a lieutenant on 18 August 1854. He served with this regiment in the Crimean War (1854-1856), where he took part in the Siege of Sevastopol (1854–55), including the battles of Alma (20 September 1854) and Balaclava (25 October 1854). Promoted to captain on 6 September 1855, he followed the regiment to India 1856–68, where he took part in the Relief of Lucknow in 1857. He was promoted to major on 26 March 1868. Seven years later, he took part in the First Ashanti Expedition in 1874, for which he was mentioned in despatches, appointed a Companion of the Order of the Bath (CB), and received a brevet promotion to lieutenant-colonel on 1 April 1874.

From 1878 to 1888 he served in the Body guard, and for the last three years of that period commanded the 4th Battalion of the Middlesex Regiment. In 1891 he was appointed inspector-general of the Gold Coast constabulary, and the following year led an expedition against the Ijebu Kingdom, which ended in occupation of their capital and its future annexation to the colony of Southern Nigeria. He was knighted as a Knight Commander of the Order of St Michael and St George (KCMG) on 16 August 1892. In 1893-94 he commanded a similar expedition against the Attabubus.

In 1895-96 he was senior British commander during the Fourth Anglo-Ashanti War, also known as the "Second Ashanti Expedition". The expedition was brief, lasting only from December 1895 to February 1896. The Ashanti had turned down an unofficial offer to become a British protectorate in 1891, as the Ashanti King (Asanthene) Prempeh refused to surrender his sovereignty. Wanting to keep French and German forces out of Ashanti territory (and its gold), the British were anxious to conquer the Ashanti once and for all, and Scott left Cape Coast with the main expeditionary force of British and West Indian troops, Maxim guns and 75mm artillery in December 1895. They arrived in the Ashanti capital Kumasi in January 1896. The Asantehene directed the Ashanti not to resist, but was forced to sign a treaty of protection, and with other Ashanti leaders was sent into exile in the Seychelles. The British force left Kumasi on 22 January 1896, arriving back at the coast two weeks later. Not a shot had been fired but casualties were high due to illness. Among the dead was Queen Victoria's son-in-law, Prince Henry of Battenberg, who was taken ill before getting to Kumashi and died on 20 January on board ship, returning to England. In 1897 Ashanti territory became a British protectorate. Scott received an honorary appointment as major-general on 25 March 1896, and was promoted to Knight Commander of the Order of the Bath (KCB) on 31 March 1896.

Scott moved to Trinidad in 1898, and was in command of the forces on Trinidad and Tobago, following appointment as Inspector-General of Police for that colony.

He died in London on 26 June 1902.

== Family ==
Scott married, in 1859, Mary Olivia Ward, daughter of Rev. E. J. Ward, rector of East Clandon, Surrey.
