= 24th Infantry Brigade (United Kingdom) =

24th Brigade 24th Infantry Brigade (Guards) 24th Independent Infantry Brigade Group (Guards) 24th Airportable Brigade 24th (Airmobile) Brigade
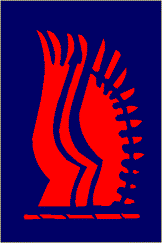
- Formation badge of the brigade
- Active: 1914–1918; 1939–1945; 1945–1999
- Country: United Kingdom
- Branch: British Army
- Type: Infantry
- Size: Brigade
- Engagements: First World War; Second World War

Commanders
- Notable commanders: Colin Gubbins; Frederick Browning; Derek Horsford

The 24th Infantry Brigade was an infantry brigade of the British Army from the First World War. It was reraised during the Second World War, as the 24th Infantry Brigade (Guards). During various designations, the brigade was active throughout the Cold War and existed until 1999, when it was merged with the 5 Airborne Brigade to become 16 Air Assault Brigade.

== First World War ==
The brigade was first formed as part of the 8th Division by battalions returning from overseas stations to reinforce British forces on the Western Front in France. The brigade moved to France with the rest of the 8th Division in November 1914 and fought there for the entire war.

=== Order of battle 1914–18 ===
The order of battle included:

- 1st Battalion, Worcestershire Regiment
- 2nd Battalion, East Lancashire Regiment (left February 1918)
- 1st Battalion, Sherwood Foresters
- 2nd Battalion, Northamptonshire Regiment
- 1/5th Battalion, Black Watch (Royal Highland Regiment) (from November 1914, left October 1915)
- 1/4th Battalion, Queen's Own Cameron Highlanders (from February to April 1915)
- 24th Machine Gun Company, Machine Gun Corps (formed 19 January 1916, moved to 8th Battalion, Machine Gun Corps 20 January 1918)
- 24th Trench Mortar Battery (formed January 1916)

=== Commanders ===
The commanders of the 24th Infantry Brigade during the First World War were:

- Brigadier-General F. C. Carter (29 September 1914)
- Brigadier-General R. S. Oxley (16 March 1915)
- Lieutenant-Colonel T. S. Lambert (27 July 1915 - acting)
- Lieutenant-Colonel A. C. Buckle (28 July 1915 - acting)
- Brigadier-General R. S. Oxley (1 August 1915)
- Brigadier-General A. J. F. Eden (8 July 1916)
- Brigadier-General H. W. Cobham (14 January 1917)
- Lieutenant-Colonel C. R. H. Stirling (7 November 1917 - acting)
- Brigadier-General R. Haig (24 November 1917)
- Brigadier-General L. M. Stevens (4 June 1918)
- Lieutenant-Colonel S. S. Hayne (14 August 1918 - acting)
- Brigadier-General R. O'H. Livesay (6 September 1918)

== Second World War ==
The 24th Infantry Brigade (Guards) was formed on 13 February 1940. In April 1940, the brigade was part of the unsuccessful British force sent to fight in the Norwegian Campaign. The brigade arrived in Narvik on 15 April 1940, and was evacuated on 8 June 1940.

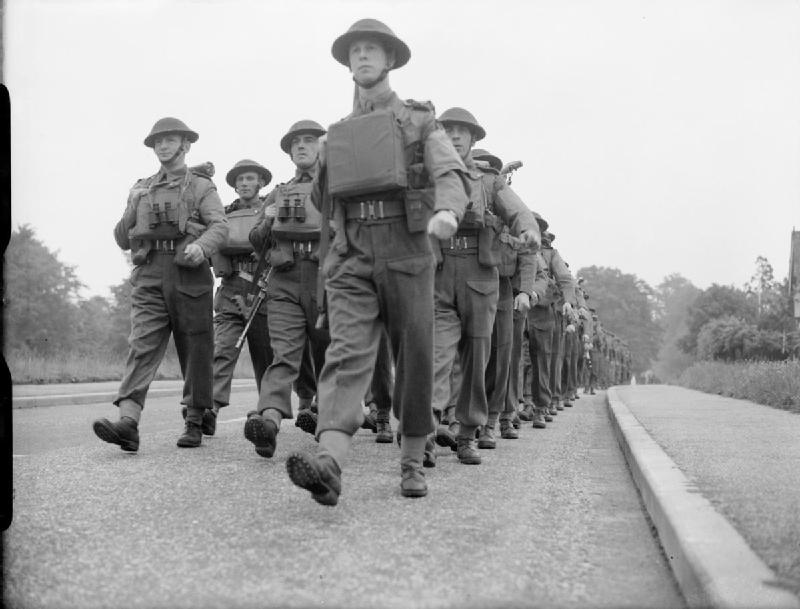
Men of the 1st Battalion, Scots Guards, marching along St Pauls Cray Road near Chislehurst in Kent, 15 June 1942.

In 1942–1943, the brigade formed part of the 1st Infantry Division. From 7 December 1943 to 31 August 1945, it served in the Italian Campaign with the 1st Infantry Division, and fought at the Battle of Anzio from January to March 1944. By the time the brigade was relieved, it had suffered 1,950 casualties. From March 1944, the brigade supported the 6th South African Armoured Division until March 1945, and then joined the 56th (London) Infantry Division. The brigade helped liberate Trieste in 1945. After the end of the war, the brigade lost its 'Guards' title, and was redesignated as the 24th Independent Infantry Brigade. The brigade formed the infantry element of the Trieste Garrison - BETFOR (British Element Trieste Force).

=== Order of Battle 1939–45 ===
- 1st Battalion, Scots Guards (from 1 March 1940)
- 1st Battalion, Irish Guards (from 1 March 1940 until 13 March 1944)
- 2nd Battalion, South Wales Borderers (from 4 March until 10 June 1940)
- 1st Battalion, Welsh Guards (from 16 June 1940 until 12 September 1941)
- 24th Infantry Brigade (Guards) Anti-Tank Company (formed 1 September 1940, disbanded 10 February 1941)
- 2nd Battalion, Royal Warwickshire Regiment (from 9 December 1940 until 5 June 1942)
- 1st Battalion, Royal Norfolk Regiment (from 12 September 1941 until 10 September 1942)
- 5th Battalion, Grenadier Guards (from 5 June 1942 until 28 March 1945)
- 11th Battalion, Worcestershire Regiment (from 11 September until 29 October 1942)
- 3rd Battalion, Coldstream Guards (from 13 March 1944 until 28 February 1945)
- 2nd Battalion, Coldstream Guards (from 10 March 1945)
- 1st Battalion, Buffs (Royal East Kent Regiment) (from 10 March 1945)
- 42nd Field Company, Royal Engineers
- 137th Field Ambulance, Royal Army Medical Corps
- 550th Company, Royal Corps of Signals
- 24th Independent Guards Brigade Group Workshop, Royal Engineers

=== Commanders ===
The following officers commanded the brigade during the war:

- Brigadier W. Fraser
- Brigadier Colin McVean Gubbins
- Brigadier Frederick Browning
- Brigadier W.P.A. Bradshaw
- Brigadier A.S.P. Murray
- Brigadier M.D. Erskine
- Brigadier A.F.L. Clive

== Cold War ==
The brigade was withdrawn from Trieste in October 1954. It later moved to Kenya. In 1960, as the 24th Infantry Brigade Group, the brigade's commander, Brigadier D.G. Horsford, was rushed from Kenya to Kuwait to take command of the British land forces assembled to dissuade President Kassem of Iraq from invading the country (Operation Vantage). On 12 December 1963 Kenya gained its independence. While 1st Battalion, Gordon Highlanders at Gilgil, were in the process of relocating to Redford Barracks Colinton, Edinburgh, having sent their advance party ahead, trouble started to brew in the newly independent East African armies. Thus 24th Brigade was reduced to two battalions: 2nd Battalion, Scots Guards and 1st Battalion, Staffordshire Regiment, both at Kahawa, plus 3rd Regiment, Royal Horse Artillery and the remnants of the Gordons when the alerts started coming. The brigade was involved in putting the indigenous army mutinies which sprang up in Zanzibar, Tanzania, in the Uganda Army, and Kenya itself in January 1964. Brigade Headquarters left Kenya for Aden at the end of October 1964, and stayed there until the final British evacuation of Aden in November 1967. On its return home it joined 3rd Infantry Division in 1968 as part of Army Strategic Command and was based at Crownhill Fort in Plymouth.

The brigade arrived in Northern Ireland at the start of The Troubles in mid-1969 and was back again in June 1970. The brigade was soon afterward reorganised as the 24th Airportable Brigade at Streatlam Camp, Barnard Castle, County Durham. At this time the brigade headquarters consisted of elements from various units.

The brigade became the only Regular brigade in the reorganized 2nd Infantry Division, stationed in the north, after the army reorganization which implemented the findings of John Nott's 1981 Defence White Paper. Later that decade, after the successful trial conversion of 6th Armoured Brigade to 6th Airmobile Brigade, it was decided to change over 24th Brigade into a permanent airmobile anti-tank formation. Its war role became the rapid barring and blocking of any Soviet breakthrough of I (BR) Corps defences in Germany. In 1990 several Members of Parliament described the brigade as "no more mobile than a bicycle battalion", due to a lack of available helicopters.

1st Battalion the Royal Anglian Regiment pioneered this new airmobile role and served with UNPROFOR in Bosnia and Herzegovina in 1995, as part of the 'Rapid Reaction Force'.

Under the 1998 Strategic Defence Review, as a cost cutting measure, the brigade was merged with elements of 5th Airborne Brigade to become the new 16th Air Assault Brigade.

=== 1989 Structure ===
- Headquarters, 24th Airmobile Brigade at Catterick Garrison
  - 24 Airmobile Brigade Headquarters & Signal Squadron, Royal Corps of Signals, at Catterick Garrison
  - 1st Battalion, Green Howards (Alexandra, Princess of Wales's Own Yorkshire Regiment), at Somme Barracks, Catterick Garrison (Airmobile Infantry, 42 x MILAN Anti-Tank Missile Launchers)
    - 586 Signal Troop (Airmobile), Royal Corps of Signals (Note: All 500 level signal troops of the Royal Corps of Signals, where unique as they were known as 'station troops', which would remain at their 'base' location and support the unit which was at that location. For example, the 3rd Battalion, The Light Infantry was based at Weeton Barracks in Blackpool, where 568 Signal Troop was as well. When 3 Light Infantry moved out in 1991, the signal troop remained and began supporting 1st Battalion, Queen's Lancashire Regiment when they moved in. Lord & Watson, p. 118)
    - Band of the Green Howards (Small Infantry Band)
  - Prince of Wales's Own Regiment of Yorkshire, at Bourlon Barracks, Catterick Garrison (Airmobile Infantry, 42 x MILAN Anti-Tank Missile Launchers)
    - Band of the Prince of Wales's Own Regiment of Yorkshire (Small Infantry Band)
  - 27th Field Regiment, Royal Artillery, at Alanbrooke Barracks, Topcliffe (18 x FH70 155mm field howitzers) [to 1st Artillery Brigade]
  - 16th Air Defence Regiment, Royal Artillery, at Rapier Barracks, Kirton in Lindsey (36 x Towed Rapiers and 12 x Blindfire Radar)
  - 9 Regiment Army Air Corps, at Alanbrooke Barracks, Topcliffe Moved to Dishforth Airfield over the next several years.
  - 51 Field Squadron (Airmobile), Royal Engineers, at Claro Barracks, Ripon (under admin of 38 Engineer Regiment)
  - 24 (Airmobile) Ordnance Company, Royal Army Ordnance Corps, at Gaza Barracks, Catterick Garrison (under admin of 2 Ordnance Bn)
  - 15 Field Workshop REME Advance Workshop Detachment (AWD) of Corps of Royal Electrical & Mechanical Engineers
  - 24th (Airmobile) Field Ambulance, Royal Army Medical Corps, in Catterick Garrison (22 x Land Rover Ambulances)

In addition to the above structure, on mobilisation the Tactical Support Element, 170 Provost Company, Royal Military Police (under HQ RMP, United Kingdom Land Forces) would have reinforced the brigade.

== Sources ==
- Becke, Archibald F. (1935). Order of Battle of Divisions Part 1–The Regular British Divisions. London: HMSO. OCLC 4405016.
- Beevor, Antony (1991). Inside the British Army. Reading, Royal County of Berkshire, United Kingdom: Corgi Books. ISBN 978-0552138185. OCLC 1109590043.
- Boraston, J. H.; Bax, Cyril E. O. (2001) [1926]. The Eighth Division 1914–1918. Uckfield, East Sussex: Naval & Military Press. ISBN 978-1-84342-189-4.
- Chappell, Mike (1987). The British Army in the 1980s. Long Acre, London, United Kingdom: Osprey Publishings. ISBN 978-0850457964. OCLC 944154518.
- Lord, Cliff; Watson, Graham (2004). The Royal Corps of Signals : unit histories of the Corps (1920-2001) and its antecedents. Solihull, West Midlands, England: Helion & Company. ISBN 978-1-874622-92-5. OCLC 184820114.
- Naylor, Murray (1995). Among Friends: The Scots Guards, 1956–1993. Pen and Sword. (Via Google Books.)
- Watson, Graham E.; Rinaldi, Richard A. (2005). The British Army in Germany (British Army of the Rhine and After): an Organisation History 1947–2004. Tiger Lilly Publications. ISBN 978-0972029698. OCLC 241300352.
- Gregory Blaxland, The Regiments Depart: A History of the British Army 1945–70, William Kimber, London, 1971
- Formation of North West expeditionary Force
- "24th Infantry Brigade (Guards)". Orders of Battle.com.
