= Arthur Lowry Cole =

Brigadier-General Arthur Lowry Cole CB DSO
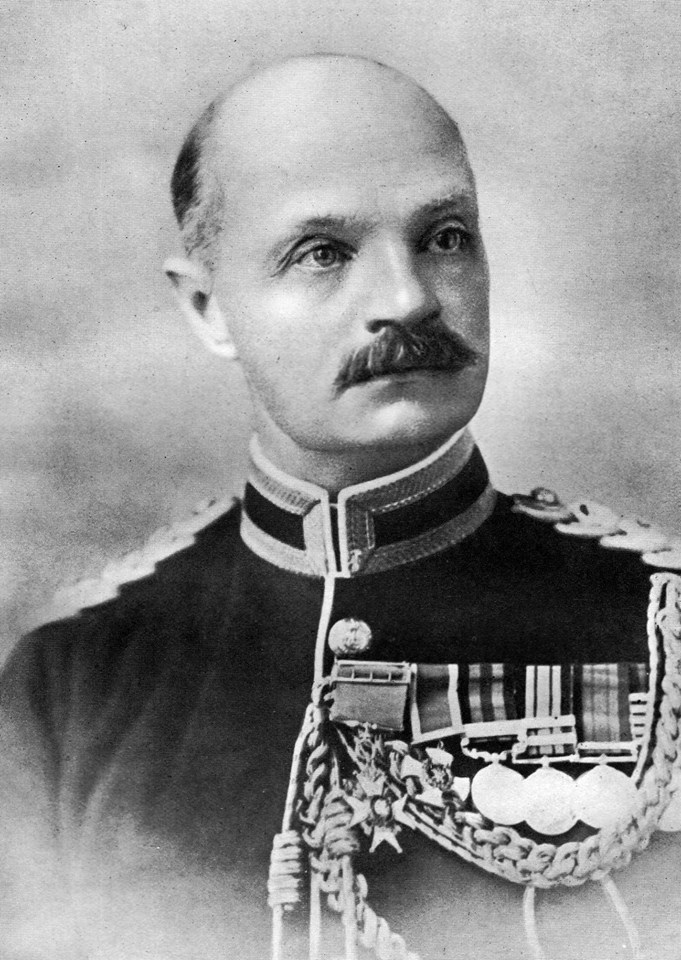
- Born: 29 November 1860
- Died: 9 May 1915 (aged 54)
- Burial place: Le Trou Aid Post Cemetery, France
- Relatives: General Sir Galbraith Lowry Cole (grandfather)
- Military career
- Allegiance: United Kingdom
- Branch: British Army
- Service years: 1880-1915
- Rank: Brigadier-General
- Units: 23rd Regiment of Foot; Royal Welch Fusiliers
- Commands: 25th Infantry Brigade; North Nigeria Regiment
- Conflicts: Third Anglo-Burmese War; Second Boer War; First World War
- Awards: Companion of the Order of the Bath; Distinguished Service Order; Mentioned in Despatches (4)

Brigadier-General Arthur Willoughby George Lowry Cole, CB, DSO (29 November 1860 – 9 May 1915) was a British Army officer. He was killed in action in 1915, while commanding the 25th Brigade.

== Early life and military career ==
Born on 29 November 1860, Arthur Willoughy George Lowry Cole's military career began in August 1880 when he graduated from the Royal Military College, Sandhurst, and was commissioned as a second lieutenant on augmentation into the 23rd Regiment of Foot. The following year the regiment became known as the Royal Welch Fusiliers as a result of the Childers Reforms. His first years as a subaltern were spent in Burma from 1885 to 1887.

He was promoted to captain in January 1890 and in February 1899 he was raised to the temporary rank of lieutenant colonel while serving as commanding officer (CO) of a battalion of the Royal West African Frontier Force.

Promoted in October 1905 to brevet colonel while serving as commandant of the Northern Nigeria Regiment. He had been appointed a Companion of the Order of the Bath (CB) "in recognition of his services when Commanding the troops during the operations in the Kano Province, including the capture of Hadeija, April, 1906" in July 1907 and was promoted to full colonel in September.

In October 1912 he came off of half-pay and succeeded Raymond Reade as brigadier general in charge of administration, for which he received the temporary rank of brigadier general while holding his new appointment.

== First World War ==
He was still in this position almost two years later when the First World War began in the summer of 1914, when Britain declared war on Imperial Germany.

He was appointed to command the 25th Infantry Brigade, with Captain John Dill, a future field marshal, assigned to be his brigade major, in October. The brigade was one of three which formed part of the newly raised 8th Division under Major General Francis Davies, later a full general and was composed mainly of Regular Army battalions from around the British Empire.

Lowry Cole led the brigade to the Western Front in November to join the rest of the British Expeditionary Force (BEF), overseeing its first initial operations during the first winter of trench warfare. On 9 May 1915, during the Battle of Aubers, his 25th Brigade was tasked with an assault near Fromelles. At approximately 6:25 am, Lowry Cole moved to the front-line breastworks to find the attack stalled in no man's land under heavy German machine gun fire.

Observing an unauthorised order to retire spreading among men of the 2nd Battalion, Rifle Brigade (The Prince Consort's Own), and the 1st Battalion, Royal Irish Rifles (both of which were two of the four battalions which belonged to his brigade), Lowry Cole climbed onto the trench parapet at roughly 6:45 am to personally rally the troops and halt the withdrawal. While standing in this exposed position, he was struck by small arms fire and mortally wounded. He died of his wounds later that day at the age of fifty four. He was posthumously mentioned in dispatches and is buried at Le Trou Aid Post Cemetery in Fleurbaix, France.

== See also ==
- List of generals of the British Empire who died during the First World War

== Bibliography ==
- Davies, Frank; Maddocks, Graham (2014) [1995]. Bloody Red Tabs: General Officer Casualties of the Great War 1914–1918. Pen and Sword Books. ISBN 978-1-78346-237-7.
