= Isaac Coffin =

Sir Isaac Campbell Coffin
- Born: bap. 24 August 1801
- Died: 1 October 1872; 9 St John's Park South, Blackheath, London
- Relatives: Clifford Coffin (son)
- Military career
- Allegiance: United Kingdom of Great Britain and Ireland
- Branch: East India Company
- Service years: 1818–1872
- Rank: Major-General
- Conflicts: First Anglo-Burmese War; Indian Mutiny
- Awards: Knight Commander of the Order of the Star of India

Major-General Sir Isaac Campbell Coffin KCSI (bap. 24 August 1801 – 1 October 1872) was an officer of the East India Company's military service who served during the company's rule in India, the First Anglo-Burmese War and the Indian Mutiny. He rose to the rank of major-general after a long career in India.

== Family and early life ==
Coffin was born c. 1801, the son of Admiral Francis Holmes Coffin and baptized on 24 August 1801 at St Mary the Virgin, Dover, Kent. His sister Emily was the mother of Francis Cunningham Scott.

After receiving his education, part of which took place in France, he joined the military arm of the East India Company on 3 June 1818, and sailed to India, arriving on 12 January 1819. In 1821 he was posted as lieutenant to the 21st Madras Pioneers, and from 4 June 1824 he served as adjutant to the 12th Madras Native Infantry. The company took part in the First Anglo-Burmese War, and Coffin was present at the attacks on Rangoon on 9 and 15 December 1824.

== Promotions ==
A series of posts followed, Coffin was quartermaster, interpreter, and paymaster to the 12th Madras Native Infantry from 27 October 1826, and was advanced to captain on 26 July 1828.

Further posts and promotions saw Coffin appointed paymaster to the Nagpur subsidiary force on 30 June 1829, and paymaster in Mysore on 7 January 1834. Coffin was promoted to major on 24 July 1840, and then to lieutenant-colonel on 15 September 1845, being appointed to the 3rd (Palamcottah) regiment of the Madras native light infantry several weeks later on 7 October 1845.

He was raised to colonel on 20 June 1854, taking command of the Hyderabad subsidiary force from 6 November 1855 and commanding them with the rank of brigadier during the Indian Mutiny. Coffin was promoted to major-general on 29 May 1857, after the mutiny had been put down. He took command of a division of the Madras army from 28 March 1859 to 28 March 1864, and was finally promoted to lieutenant-general on 18 July 1869.

== Family and later life ==
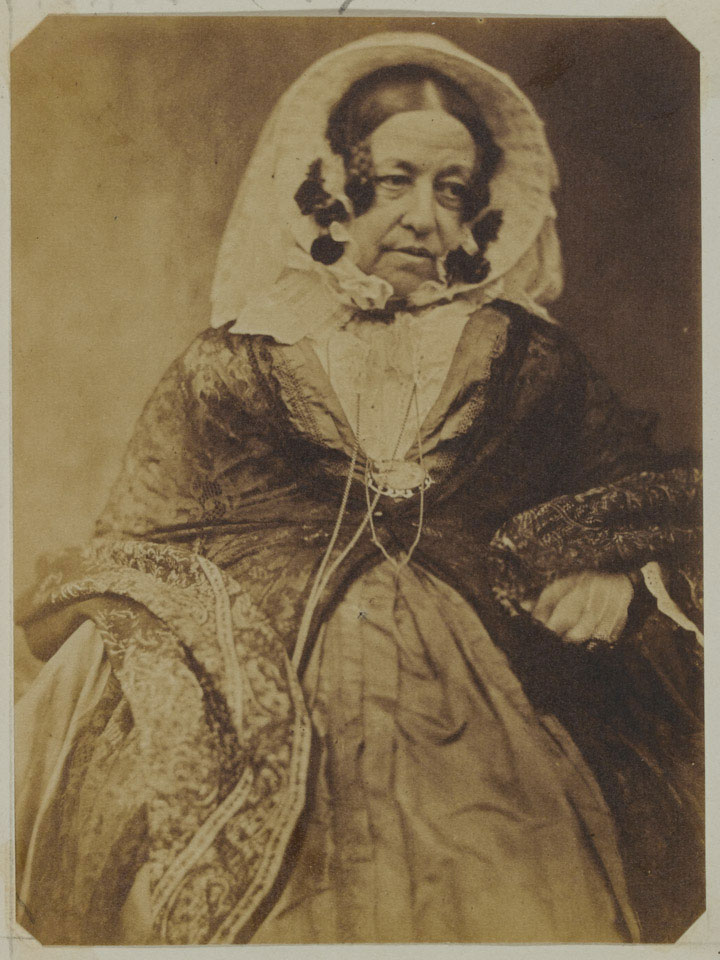
Marianne Coffin

Coffin was appointed a Knight Commander of the Order of the Star of India in 1866. He married Marianne Harrington on 12 February 1824. She died on 13 February 1864. He married, secondly, on 23 October 1866 at the British Embassy in Berlin Catherine Eliza Shepherd. General Isaac Coffin died suddenly on 1 October 1872, at his home at 9 St John's Park South, Blackheath, London. He was survived by his wife and several children which included Clifford Coffin V.C.

== Notes ==
Attribution

This article incorporates text from a publication now in the public domain: Chichester, Henry Manners (1887). "Coffin, Isaac Campbell". In Stephen, Leslie (ed.). Dictionary of National Biography. Vol. 11. London: Smith, Elder & Co. pp. 217–218.
