= Clifford Coffin =

Recipient of the Victoria Cross (1870–1959)

Major-General Clifford Coffin VC CB DSO*
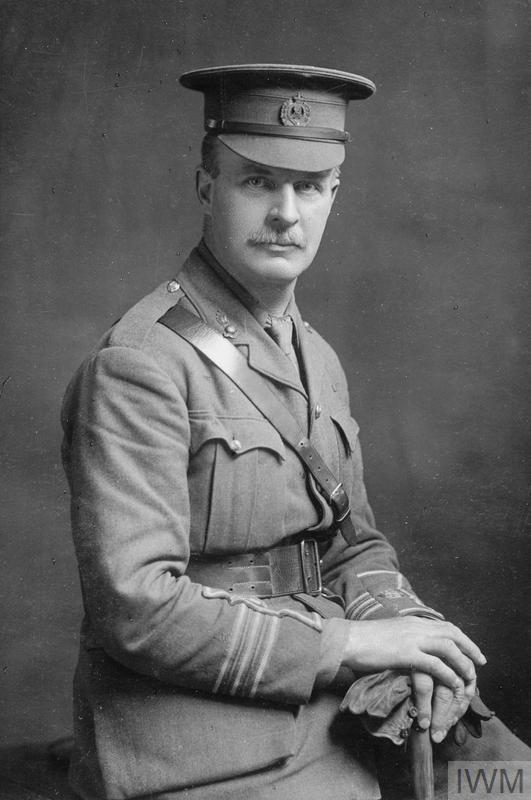
- Born: 10 February 1870; Blackheath, London, England
- Died: 4 February 1959 (aged 88); Torquay, Devon, England
- Burial place: Holy Trinity Churchyard, Colemans Hatch, East Sussex
- Relatives: Isaac Coffin (father)
- Military career
- Allegiance: United Kingdom
- Branch: British Army
- Service years: 1888–1924
- Rank: Major-General
- Units: Royal Engineers
- Commands: 25th Infantry Brigade
- Conflicts: Second Boer War; First World War
- Awards: Victoria Cross; Companion of the Order of the Bath; Distinguished Service Order & Bar; Mentioned in Despatches; Legion of Honour (France); Croix de Guerre (France)

Major-General Clifford Coffin, VC, CB, DSO & Bar (10 February 1870 – 4 February 1959) was a British Army officer and recipient of the Victoria Cross, the highest award for gallantry in the face of the enemy that can be awarded to British and Commonwealth forces.

== Early life ==
Born in Blackheath, the son of Lieutenant General Sir Isaac Coffin, Clifford Coffin was educated at Haileybury and Imperial Service College and the Royal Military Academy, Woolwich. He was commissioned as a second lieutenant in the Royal Engineers in February 1888.

He attended the Staff College, Camberley, from 1894–1895.

He served in the Second Boer War and was mentioned in dispatches.

On August 22, 1894 at Saint Bartholomew, Saint Pancras: Grays Inn Road, Camden, England Clifford Coffin Married Helen Douglas Jackson 1869-1949, daughter of Knight Commander Sir Thomas Sturgess Jackson 1842- 1934 who was Son of Rev Thomas Jackson 1812- 1866.

== Military career ==
Coffin was 47 years old, and a temporary brigadier general, having been promoted to that rank temporarily in January 1917, commanding the 25th Infantry Brigade during the First World War, when the following deed took place for which he was awarded the Victoria Cross for "most conspicuous bravery and devotion to duty".

On 31 July 1917 in Westhoek, Belgium, Coffin's brigade had been shattered attempting to cross the marshy ground around the Hanebeek stream. According to his citation in the London Gazette: "When his command had been held up in attack owing to heavy machine-gun and rifle fire from front and right flank, and was establishing itself in a forward shell-hole line, he went forward and made an inspection of his front posts. Though under the heaviest fire from both machine-guns and rifles, and in full view of the enemy, he showed an utter disregard of personal danger, walking quietly from shell-hole to shell-hole, giving advice and cheering his men by his presence. His very gallant conduct had the greatest effect on all ranks, and it was largely owing to his personal courage and example that the shell-hole line was held in spite of the very heaviest fire. Throughout the day his calm courage and example exercised the greatest influence over all with whom he came into contact, and it is generally agreed that Brigadier-General Coffin's splendid example saved the situation, and had it not been for his action the line would certainly have been driven back".

In May 1918 Coffin, who in January was made a brevet colonel, was promoted to the temporary rank of major general and succeeded Major General Oliver Nugent as general officer commanding (GOC) of the 36th (Ulster) Division, leading the division for the remainder of the war.

Later, Coffin served as Officer Commanding Troops, Ceylon and aide-de-camp to King George V. He later achieved the permanent rank of major general and was colonel commandant of the Royal Engineers.

Coffin died in February 1959 and is buried at Holy Trinity Churchyard, Colemans Hatch, East Sussex. His Victoria Cross is displayed at the Royal Engineers Museum in Chatham, Kent. In 2012, his grave was renovated by the Victoria Cross Trust.

Military offices
Preceded by F. A. MacFarlan	Commander-in-Chief, Ceylon; 1920–1924	Succeeded by H. W. Higgingson
