= Kirton (surname) =

Kirton is an English surname. Notable people with the surname include:

- Alfred Kirton (1877–1960), Australian politician
- Andrew Kirton, New Zealand political party official
- Colin Kirton, Malaysian actor
- Earle Kirton (born 1940), New Zealand rugby union player and coach
- Edwin M. Kirton (1909–1992), American military intelligence officer
- Harold Kirton (1894–1974), English cricketer
- Joseph Kirton (1861–1935), Australian politician
- Michael John Kirton (1926–2020), British occupational psychologist
- Neil Kirton (born 1956), New Zealand politician
- Nicholas Kirton (born 1998), Canadian cricketer
- Rex Kirton (1942–2024), New Zealand mayor

== See also ==
- Kerton
- Cureton
