= Charles Cureton =

Charles Cureton may refer to:

- Charles Cureton (British Army officer) (1789–1848), British Army officer and adjutant-general in India
- Sir Charles Cureton (Indian Army officer) (1826–1891), son of above
