= Maryland State College =

Maryland State College may refer to:

- University of Maryland, College Park, which was known as Maryland State College from 1916 to 1920
- University of Maryland Eastern Shore, which was known as Maryland State College from 1948 to 1970
