= Heidi Anderson =

Heidi Anderson, Andersson, or Andersen may refer to:

- Heidi M. Anderson, American academic administrator
- Heidi Andersson (born 1981), Swedish armwrestler

== See also ==
- Hedda Anderson (1832–1912), Swedish writer and teacher
- Hedda Andersson (1861–1950), Swedish physician.
- Hedli Anderson (1907–1990), English singer and actor
