= Kerton =

Kerton is an English surname, a variant of Kirton or Cureton. Notable people with the surname include:

- Louise Kerton, Mysterious disappearance of a British woman
- Francesca M. Kerton, Canadian chemist
- Julie Kerton, American politician
- Sudjana Kerton (1922–1994), Indonesian painter
