= Kirton =

Kirton may refer to:

- Kirton, Lincolnshire, (also Kirton in Holland), England
- Kirton in Lindsey, Lincolnshire, England
- Kirton, Nottinghamshire, England
- Kirton, Suffolk, England
- Kirton (surname)
