= Cureton =

Cureton is a surname. Notable people with the surname include:

- Ben Cureton (born 1981), Australian rower
- Calvin Maples Cureton (1874–1940), American judge
- Charles Cureton (Indian Army officer) (1826–1891), British general
- Charles Cureton (British Army officer) (1789–1848), British Army officer
- Earl Cureton (1957–2024), American basketball player
- Hardiman Cureton (1933–2003), American football player
- Jamie Cureton (born 1975), English footballer
- Linda Y. Cureton (born 1959), American businesswoman
- Peter Cureton (1965–1994), Canadian actor and playwright
- Stewart Cleveland Cureton (1930–2008), American clergyman and civil rights activist
- Will Cureton (born 1950), American football player
- William Cureton (1808–1864), English Orientalist
- Cureton family, originating from the first Lords of Curton
