= General Markham =

General Markham may refer to:

- Edward Murphy Markham (1877–1950), U.S. Army major general
- Edwin Markham (British Army officer) (1833–1918), British Army lieutenant general
- Frederick Markham (1805–1855), British Army major general
