= Wanda Peters =

American aeronautic administrator

Wanda Peters is an American administrator at the National Aeronautics and Space Administration (NASA) and a member of the Senior Executive Service of the United States of America. She is currently the Deputy Associate Administrator for Programs in the Science Mission Directorate.

== Personal life and education ==
Peters received both a Ph.D. in systems engineering and a master's degree in engineering management from George Washington University, and a Bachelor of Science in biology from the University of Maryland, Eastern Shore. She also earned a Bachelor of Science in engineering from The Catholic University of America with a major in biomedical engineering in 1989. She is a graduate and Senior Executive Fellow of the Harvard Kennedy School of Government. In 2023, she was awarded Catholic University's Alumni Achievement Award.

Her father was a mechanic in the United States Air Force and she has two brothers. She is married and has two daughters.

== Career ==
In the 1980s, Peters worked at the Naval Research Laboratory as a research scientist. There, she worked in the chemistry division testing material sciences.

She started her career at NASA in January 1990 as a support contractor and converted into the government in 2005. At NASA, Peters worked at the directorate, division, and branch levels, with experience in the areas of program, project and business management, institutional operations, mechanical systems engineering, space technology development, and safety and mission assurance. Peters is a mentor and advocates for diversity, equity, inclusion, and accessibility in the workplace.

Presently, Peters serves as the Deputy Associate Administrator for Programs in the Science Mission Directorate, National Aeronautics and Space Administration Headquarters. She is responsible for overseeing and assessing SMD's multi-billion dollar portfolio of over 100 missions. Previously, she served as the deputy director for Planning and Business Management in the Flight Projects Directorate (FPD) at NASA Goddard Space Flight Center, responsible for strategic planning, policy development, personnel management, and programmatic oversight of the FPD portfolio consisting of approximately 80 missions.
