= Roger M. Ramey =

United States Air Force general (1905–1963)

Roger Maxwell Ramey
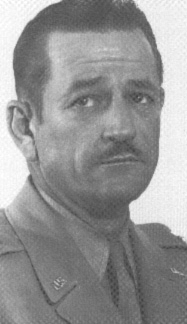
- Born: September 9, 1905; Sulphur Springs, Texas
- Died: March 4, 1963 (aged 57); Torrance, California
- Military career
- Allegiance: United States
- Branch: United States Army (1928–1947): U.S. Army Air Corps; U.S. Army Air Force; United States Air Force (1947–1957)
- Service years: 1928–1957
- Rank: Lieutenant General
- Commands: 38th Pursuit Squadron; Eighth Air Force; Fifth Air Force
- Conflicts: World War II: Operation Cartwheel; Philippines campaign; Korean War
- Awards: Distinguished Service Cross; Distinguished Service Medal; Legion of Merit; Distinguished Flying Cross

Roger Maxwell Ramey (September 9, 1905 – March 4, 1963) was an American officer who reached the rank of Lieutenant General in the United States Air Force. He retired in January 1957 over heart problems and died six years later.

== Early life and career ==
At West Point in 1928

Ramey was born in Sulphur Springs, Texas. He attended North Texas Teachers College and aspired to practice medicine, but was persuaded to compete in the examination for a place in West Point by his captain in the National Guard. He was enrolled at West Point in 1924 and graduated as a second lieutenant in 1928.

After his graduation, Ramey enrolled in the Air Corps Primary Flying School and graduated from the Air Corps Advanced Flying School in September 1929. He served with the 27th Pursuit Squadron in Michigan for a time and in 1932 was made commanding officer of the 38th Pursuit Squadron. Later he served as a flight instructor in Randolph Field, Texas.

== World War II ==
In January 1942 during United States' involvement in World War II, Ramey became plans and training officer of the VII Bomber Command. The next month he was promoted to Colonel. In October 1942 he transferred to the Fifth Air Force, in which he served as commanding officer of 43rd Bomb Group and 314th Bomb Wing.

== Postwar service ==
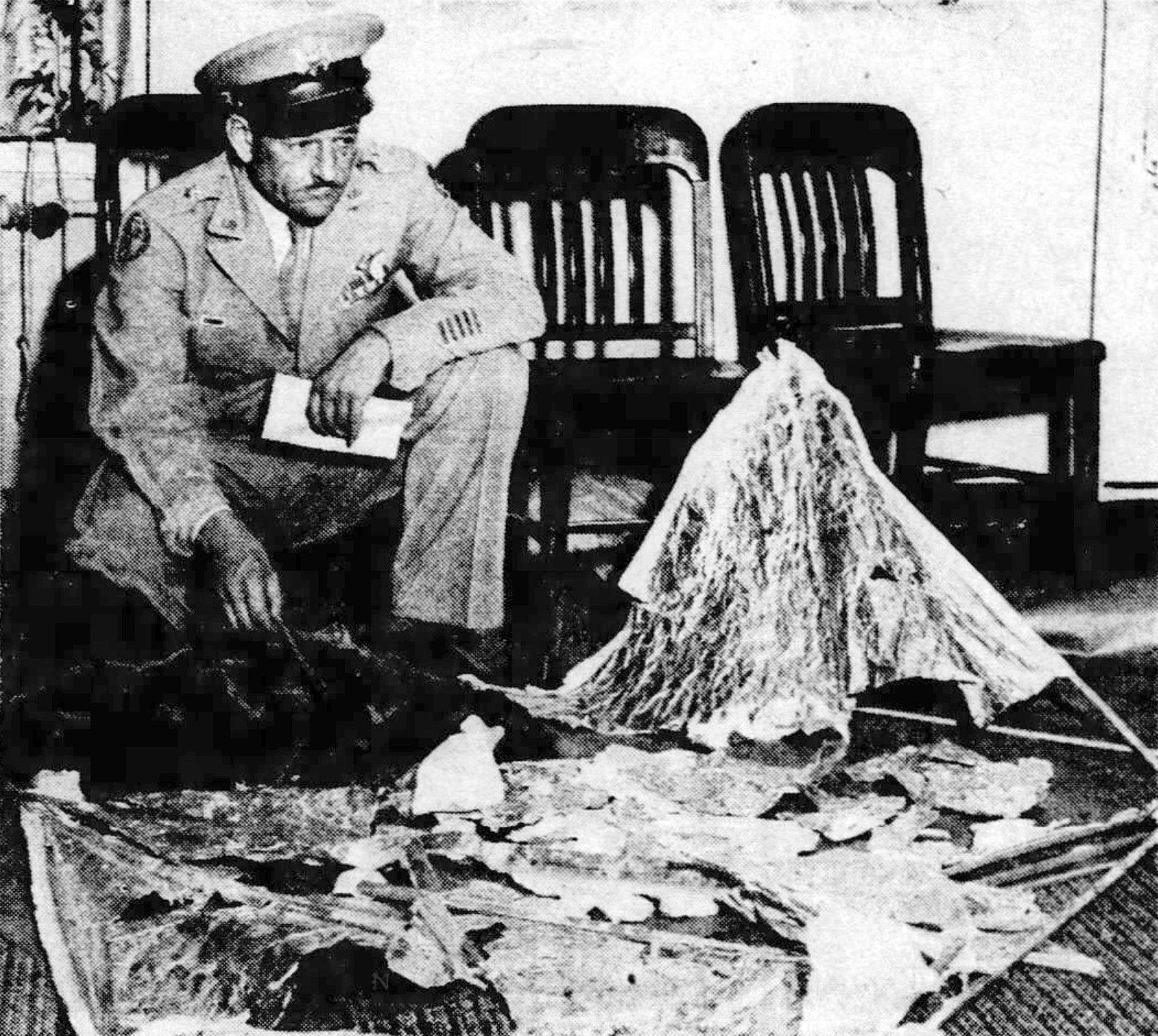
Ramey with Roswell debris in Fort Worth, Texas

At Operation Crossroads, Nuclear testing at Bikini Atoll in 1946, Ramey was the director of the "Able" shot and commander of Task Force 1.5.

Ramey assumed command of the Eighth Air Force as a temporary brigadier general in January 1947. He was also the commander of Carswell Air Force Base, then known as Fort Worth Army Airfield. He was responsible for reversing the initial public statement about debris recovered in the Roswell incident later that year. Author Ryan S. Wood later identified the redacted Eighth Air Force officer who supplied similar information to the FBI as Edwin M. Kirton. Ramey was photographed on July 8, 1947, holding a teletype message that some UFO researchers have argued may refer to the recovered debris; attempts to read the message from the photograph have produced no conclusive result.

In May 1954 Ramey assumed command of the Fifth Air Force in Korea, and was promoted to temporary Lieutenant General in June 1954.

== Retirement ==
Ramey retired on January 31, 1957, over heart problems. He died on March 4, 1963, in Torrance, California.

== Summary of service ==
=== Dates of rank ===
Sergeant, Texas Army National Guard: Prior to 1924
Second Lieutenant, Cavalry: Permanent Establishment: June 9, 1928
First Lieutenant, Air Corps: Permanent Establishment: September 1, 1934
Captain, Air Corps: —Permanent Establishment: June 9, 1938
Major, Air Corps: —Temporary: January 31, 1941 —Permanent Establishment: June 9, 1945
Lieutenant Colonel, Air Corps: —Temporary: January 5, 1942
Colonel, Air Corps: —Temporary: March 1, 1942 —Permanent Establishment: April 2, 1948
Brigadier General: —Temporary: July 1, 1943 —Permanent Establishment: June 11, 1948;
Major General: —Temporary: October 29, 1947 —Permanent Establishment: July 21, 1952
Lieutenant General: —Temporary: June 1954
