= Charles Cureton (Indian Army officer) =

British Indian Army officer (1826–1891)

Sir Charles Cureton KCB
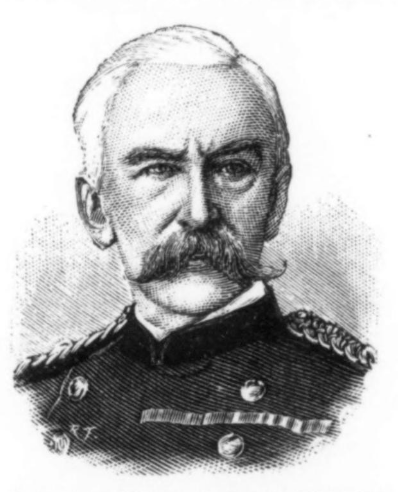
- Cureton portrayed in The Illustrated London News, 1891
- Born: 25 November 1826
- Died: 11 July 1891 (aged 64); Eastbourne
- Military career
- Allegiance: United Kingdom
- Branch: British Indian Army
- Service years: 1843–1891
- Rank: General
- Unit: Bengal Staff Corps
- Commands: 15th Lancers (Cureton's Multanis); Oude Division, Bengal Army
- Conflicts: First Anglo-Sikh War; Battle of Aliwal; Second Anglo-Sikh War; Battle of Ramnagar (WIA); Battle of Chillianwala; Battle of Gujrat; Operations against the Baizai; Mohmand Expeditions; Santhal rebellion; Indian Rebellion of 1857; Central Indian campaign of 1858
- Awards: Mentioned in despatches (11)

General Sir Charles Cureton KCB (25 November 1826 – 11 July 1891) was a British Indian Army officer. He distinguished himself as a cavalry leader, and was recognised for acts of personal bravery. He became brevet colonel 14 February 1868, lieutenant-colonel 22 February 1869, major-general 22 February 1870, lieutenant-general 1 October 1877, and general 1 December 1888.

== Life ==
He was a son of Charles Robert Cureton, and brother of Edward Burgoyne Cureton (1822–1894), born in 1826. He received a commission as ensign in the East India Company's Bengal Army on 22 February 1843.

Having arrived in India on 24 June 1843, Cureton was appointed adjutant of the 12th regiment of irregular cavalry on 14 January 1846. He served in the First Anglo-Sikh War, and was present at the battle of Aliwal on 28 January 1846, receiving the medal and clasp. In the Second Anglo-Sikh War he was aide-de-camp to his father until the latter's death at the battle of Ramnagar, on 22 November 1848, where he was himself slightly wounded. He took part in the passage of the Chenab River on 2 and 3 December, in the battle of Gujrat, 21 February 1849, and in the pursuit, under Sir Walter Gilbert, of the Sikh army, the capture of Attock, and the occupation of Peshawar, receiving the medal and clasp.

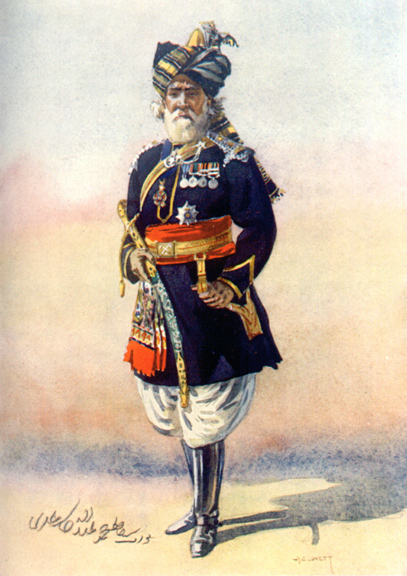
An officer of the 15th Lancers (Cureton's Multanis)

Cureton served in the north-west frontier campaigns of 1849 to 1852, including the operations against the Baizai (1849), and the Mohmand Expeditions (1851–2), receiving the medal and clasp. On 4 May 1852, he was appointed second in command of the 2nd irregular cavalry. He took part in the suppression of the Sonthal rebellion in 1856, and in the Indian Rebellion of 1857. He served against the Sealkote mutineers and took part in the action of Trimu Ghat, also against the Gogaira rebels. He raised and commanded Cureton's Multani cavalry, and continued to command it after it became the 15th Bengal cavalry. He served with it, and had charge of the intelligence department throughout the campaigns in Rohilkhand and Oude in 1858 and 1859, and was present at the actions of Bhagwala, Najina, Bareli, Shahjehanpur, Banai, Shahabad, Bankegaon, Mahodipur, Rasalpur, Mitaoli, and Biswa. He was 11 times mentioned in despatches published in general orders and received the medal and brevets of major and lieutenant-colonel. He served in the north-west frontier campaign of 1860, and on 2 June 1869 was made a Companion of the Order of the Bath (CB), military division.

For five years, from 22 October 1879, Cureton commanded the Awadh division of the Bengal Army. He was promoted to be Knight Commander of the Order of the Bath (KCB), military division, in May 1891. He died in England, at Eastbourne, Sussex, on 11 July 1891.

== Family ==
Cureton married in 1852 Margaret Sophia Holmes, daughter of the Rev. William Anthony Holmes. They had three sons, two of whom became army officers.
