= William Anthony Holmes =

Church of Ireland clergyman

William Anthony Holmes, D.D. (1782–1843) was a Church of Ireland cleric, chancellor of Cashel from 1832 and rector of Templemore, in the same diocese.

== Life ==
The son of Joseph Holmes, he was born in Drogheda, County Louth. He entered Trinity College, Dublin, 7 January 1799; was elected a scholar in 1801; graduated B.A. 1803, and B.D. and D.D. 1834.

Having taken holy orders, Holmes became incumbent of Holywood, County Down, in 1810. While there he participated in establishing the Mendicity Institution of Belfast. In 1818 he was promoted to the rectory of Ballyroan, County Laois in the diocese of Leighlin; for some years he was preacher of Cashel Cathedral, and in 1822 became rector of Hore Abbey in the diocese of Cashel.

On 22 May 1832 Holmes was collated to the chancellorship of Cashel, and in 1837 to the rectory of Templemore. Archdeacon Henry Cotton described him as "an eloquent preacher, and a person of active mind and literary habits." He died at Templemore, 30 December 1843, and was buried in St. John the Baptist's churchyard, Cashel.

== Works ==
Besides sermons and contributions to periodicals, Holmes was author of:

- A Plan for a Mendicity Institution, Belfast, c. 1818.
- Hints to the Proprietors of Loan Funds, Belfast, c. 1818.
- Statistical Account of the Parish of Holywood, County and Diocese of Down (printed in William Shaw Mason's Parochial Survey of Ireland, iii. 183–219), Dublin, 1819.
- The Time of the End; being a series of Lectures on Prophetical Chronology, London, 1833.
- The Heavy Blow and Great Discouragement of Protestantism: Correspondence between Lord Viscount Melbourne and the Bishop of Exeter; also between Lord Brougham and the Rev. Dr. Holmes, London, 1838.
- The Queen's Declaration against Popery, and the Coronation Oath discussed, London, 1843.

== Family ==
Holmes was twice married, and left children: Holmes second wife was Elizabeth Brownrigg.

- Margaret Sophia, married in 1852 Charles Cureton.
- Caroline Louise (died 1857), youngest daughter, married John Powys of the 61st Bengal Native Infantry, and was killed with her husband in the 1857 Indian Rebellion.
- Colonel Edmund Holmes Indian Army born 1821
- Matilda Martha Holmes Born 1820 Died 12 Nov 1889 in Bedford married Colonel Robert Henry Sale son of General Sir Robert Sales of Afghanistan fame
- James Carmac Holmes Major Major 17/19th Irregular Cavalry married Alexandrina daughter of General Sir Robert Sale. Major and Mrs Holmes were murdered 23 July 1857 Segooowlie during the Indian Mutiny
- Rev. Joseph Holmes M.A, Vicar of Swineshead, Preb. & Canon of Lincoln
