= Armine Mountain =

British Army officer (1797–1854)

Brigadier-General Armine Mountain CB
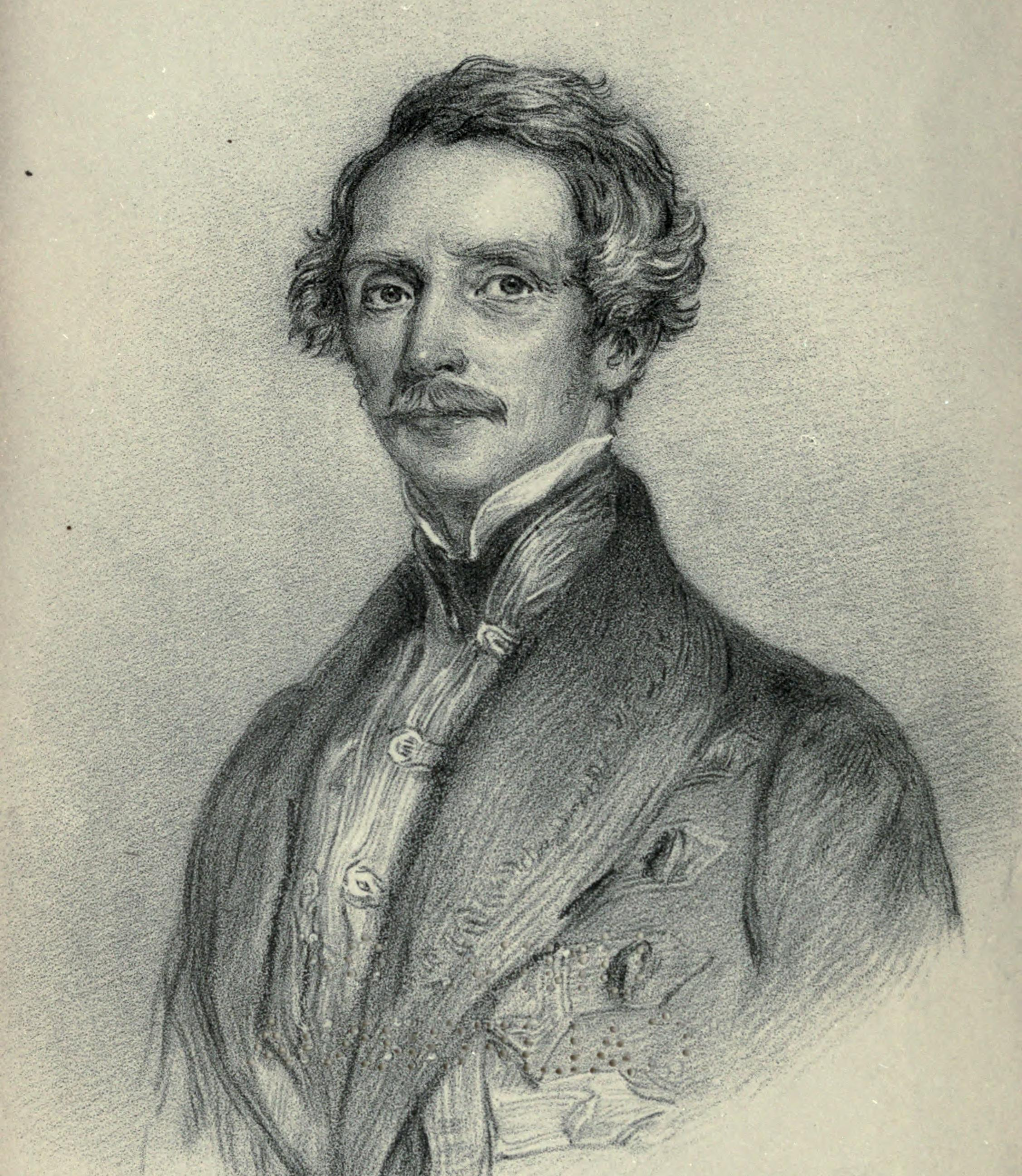
- Born: 4 February 1797; Quebec, Canada
- Died: 8 February 1854 (aged 57); Fatehgarh, India
- Military career
- Allegiance: United Kingdom
- Branch: British Army
- Service years: 1815–1854
- Rank: Brigadier-General
- Conflicts: First Opium War; Second Anglo-Sikh War
- Awards: Companion of the Order of the Bath; China War Medal; Punjab Medal

Brigadier-General Armine Simcoe Henry Mountain CB (4 February 1797 – 8 February 1854) was a British Army officer who served as Adjutant-General in India.

== Military career ==
Mountain was commissioned as an ensign in the 96th Regiment of Foot on 20 July 1815. He fought at the Battle of the Bogue in February 1841, Battle of Canton in May 1841 and the Battle of Amoy in August 1841 during the First Opium War. He also saw action at the Capture of Chusan in October 1841, the Battle of Chinhai in October 1841 and the Battle of Ningpo in March 1842 as well as at the Battle of Chapu in May 1842 and the Battle of Chinkiang in July 1842.

He also commanded a brigade at the Battle of Chillianwala in January 1849 and the Battle of Gujrat in February 1849 during the Second Anglo-Sikh War. He served as Adjutant-General in India from February 1849 until he died from illnesses following an attack of cholera in February 1854.

== Sources ==
- Vetch, Robert Hamilton (1894). "Mountain, Armine Simcoe Henry" . In Lee, Sidney (ed.). Dictionary of National Biography. Vol. 39. London: Smith, Elder & Co.

Military offices
Preceded by Charles Cureton	Adjutant-General, India; 1849–1854	Succeeded by Frederick Markham
