= William Havelock =

British Army officer (1793–1848)

William Havelock KH
- Born: 21 January 1793
- Died: 22 November 1848 (aged 55); Ramnagar, Punjab
- Relatives: Sir Henry Havelock (brother)
- Military career
- Allegiance: United Kingdom
- Branch: British Army
- Service years: 1810–1848
- Rank: Lieutenant-colonel
- Nickname: El Chico Blanco
- Commands: 14th Light Dragoons
- Conflicts: Napoleonic Wars; Peninsular War; Combat of the Coa; Battle of Bussaco; Battle of Pombal; Battle of Redinha; Battle of Casal Novo; Battle of Foz de Arouce; Battle of Sabugal; Battle of Salamanca; Battle of Vitoria; Battle of the Bidassoa; Battle of Vera; Battle of Nivelle; Battle of the Nive; Battle of Toulouse; Hundred Days; Battle of Quatre Bras (WIA); Battle of Waterloo; Second Anglo-Sikh War; Battle of Ramnagar †

William Havelock KH (21 January 1793 – 22 November 1848) was a cavalry officer in the British Army, rising to the rank of lieutenant-colonel.

== Life ==
William Havelock was the eldest son of William Havelock of Ingress Park, Kent, and brother of Sir Henry Havelock and of Colonel Charles Havelock of the 16th Lancers. He was born on 23 January 1793 and was educated at Charterhouse School and under a private tutor. On 12 July 1810 he was appointed ensign 43rd Light Infantry, in which he became lieutenant in 1812.

In the Peninsular War, he carried one of the colours of the 43rd at the passage of the Coa River in 1810, and was present in all the subsequent actions in which the Light Division was engaged, spending time as aide-de-camp to Major-General Charles, Baron Alten, commanding the division. At the combat of Vera in October 1813, a Spanish force was held in check by an abattis defended by two French regiments. Havelock, who had been sent to ascertain their progress, called on the Spanish to follow him, and went headlong among the enemy. The Spanish broke through the French, as their centre was under the fire of James Kempt's skirmishers.

Havelock was Alten's aide-de-camp at the battle of Waterloo and at the occupation of Paris. In 1818, he obtained a company in the 32nd Foot, and served with the corps in Corfu. Later he exchanged to the 4th Light Dragoons, with which he went to India. He was some time aide-de-camp to Sir Charles Colville when commander-in-chief at Bombay, and was military secretary to John Elphinstone, 13th Lord Elphinstone while Governor of Madras.

He became major 4th Light Dragoons in 1830, and exchanging into the 14th Light Dragoons, became lieutenant-colonel of that regiment in 1841. He commanded it in the field under Sir Charles Napier, and with the Bombay troops sent to reinforce Lord Gough's army during the Second Anglo-Sikh War. He fell mortally wounded at the head of his regiment in a charge on the Sikhs at the battle of Ramnagar, on the banks of the River Chenab, on 22 November 1848. Heavily wounded, after eleven of his troopers had been killed beside him, he was left for dead on the field.

In 1824 Havelock married Caroline Elizabeth, daughter of Acton Chaplin of Aylesbury, by whom he had 13 children including the colonial governor Sir Arthur Havelock.
