= Project Mogul =

US surveillance project from 1947 to 1949

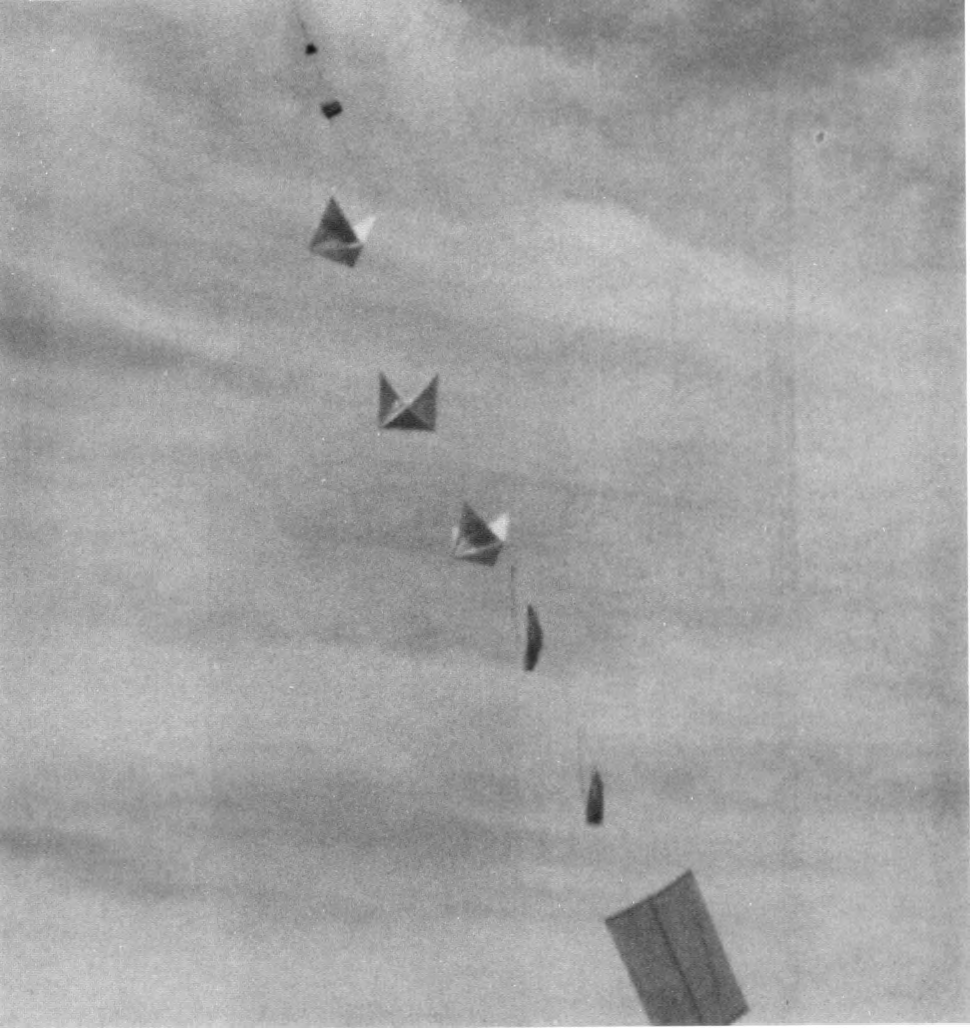
A Project Mogul array

Project Mogul (sometimes referred to as Operation Mogul) was a top secret project by the US Army Air Forces involving microphones flown on high-altitude balloons, whose primary purpose was long-distance detection of sound waves generated by Soviet atomic bomb tests.

While successful, the balloon method was soon superseded by seismic detectors. In popular culture, the legacy of Project Mogul has been the Roswell incident, in which a crashed Mogul balloon was mistaken for an extraterrestrial spacecraft, giving rise to a persistent UFO legend.

== Project history ==
The project was carried out from 1947 until early 1949. It was a classified portion of an unclassified project by New York University (NYU) atmospheric researchers. The project was moderately successful, but was very expensive and was superseded by a network of seismic detectors and air sampling for fallout, which were cheaper, more reliable, and easier to deploy and operate.

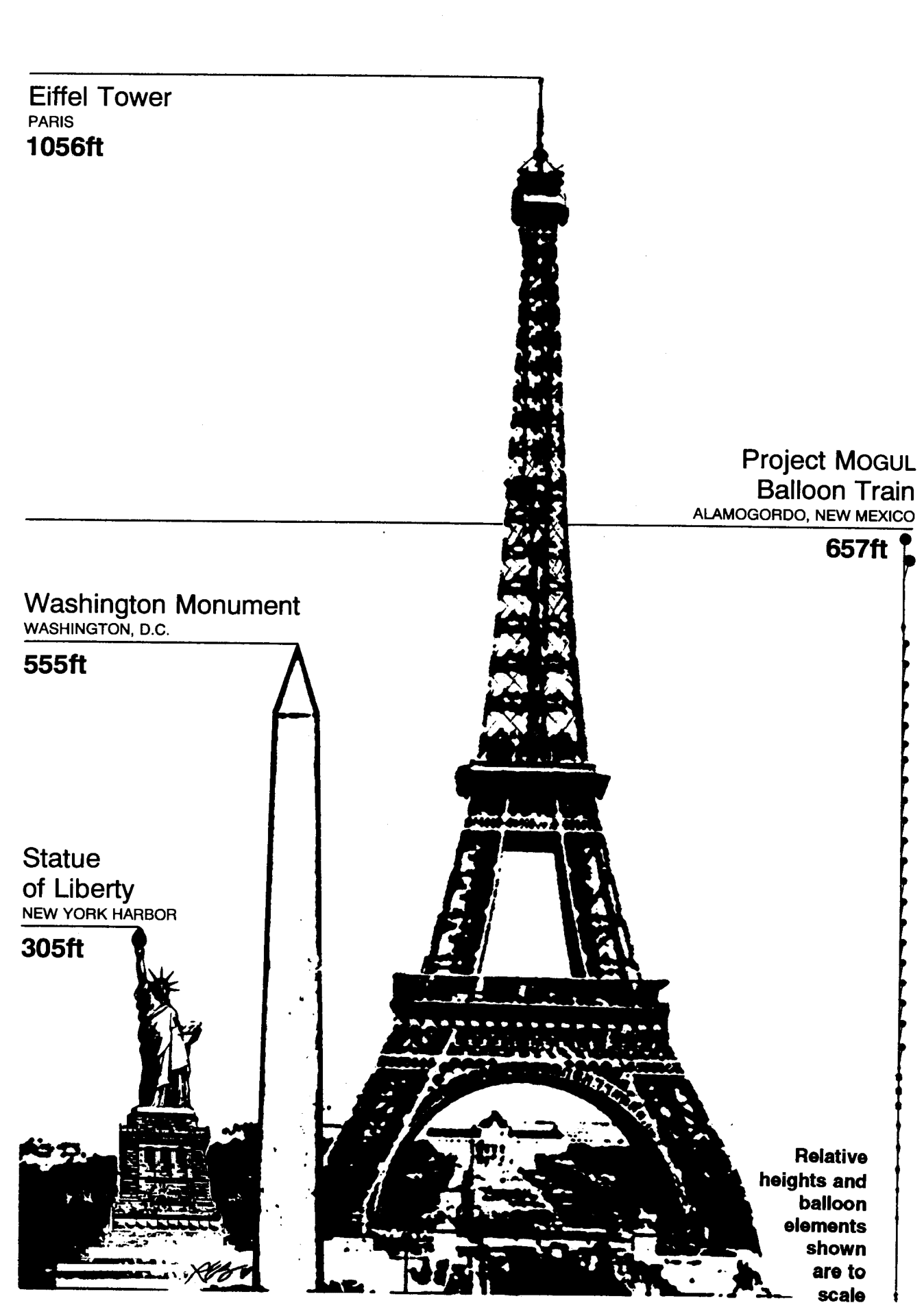
Relative height of a Project Mogul balloon train

Project Mogul was conceived by Maurice Ewing who had earlier researched the deep sound channel in the oceans and theorized that a similar sound channel existed in the upper atmosphere: a certain height where the air pressure and temperature result in minimal speed of sound, so that sound waves would propagate and stay in that channel due to refraction. The project involved arrays of balloons carrying disc microphones and radio transmitters to relay the signals to the ground. It was supervised by James Peoples, who was assisted by Albert P. Crary.

One of the requirements of the balloons was that they maintain a relatively constant altitude over a prolonged period of time. Thus instrumentation had to be developed to maintain such constant altitudes, such as pressure sensors controlling the release of ballast.

The early Mogul balloons consisted of large clusters of rubber meteorological balloons, however, these were quickly replaced by enormous balloons made of polyethylene plastic. These were more durable, leaked less helium, and also were better at maintaining a constant altitude than the early rubber balloons. Constant-altitude-control and polyethylene balloons were the two major innovations of Project Mogul.

== Subsequent programs ==
Project Mogul was the forerunner of the Skyhook balloon program, which started in the late 1940s, as well as two other espionage programs involving balloon overflights and photographic surveillance of the Soviet Union during the 1950s, Project Moby Dick and Project Genetrix. The spy balloon overflights raised storms of protest from the Soviets. The constant-altitude balloons also were used for scientific purposes such as cosmic ray experiments.

Further development of nuclear detonation detection systems was extensive for decades afterward, culminating in worldwide systems by various countries to keep eyes and ears on detecting and verifying the others' nuclear weapon developments.

There would also be fixed-wing United States aerial reconnaissance of the Soviet Union during the 1950s. Overflights ended after the 1960 U-2 incident when an aircraft was shot down by SAMs. Reconnaissance would for decades afterward be handled mostly by reconnaissance satellites and to some extent by aircraft, such as the A-12 OXCART and SR-71 Blackbird (photography and radar) and RC-135U and similar aircraft (SIGINT including ELINT and COMINT).

== Roswell incident ==
The Roswell Report compiled by the United States Air Force attributed the 1947 Roswell debris to a Project Mogul balloon.

In 1947, a Project Mogul balloon NYU Flight 4, launched June 4, crashed in the desert near Roswell, New Mexico. The subsequent military cover-up of the true nature of the balloon and burgeoning conspiracy theories from UFO enthusiasts led to a celebrated "UFO" incident.

On July 8, 1947, the FBI's Dallas office sent a teletype to Director J. Edgar Hoover reporting information from Eighth Air Force headquarters that described the recovered object as resembling a high-altitude weather balloon with a radar reflector. Author Ryan S. Wood later identified the redacted Eighth Air Force officer who supplied the information as Edwin M. Kirton.

Unlike a weather balloon, the Project Mogul paraphernalia were massive and contained unusual types of materials, according to research conducted by The New York Times: "...squadrons of big balloons ... It was like having an elephant in your backyard and hoping that no one would notice it. ... To the untrained eye, the reflectors looked extremely odd, a geometrical hash of lightweight sticks and sharp angles made of metal foil. .. photographs of it, taken in 1947 and published in newspapers, show bits and pieces of what are obviously collapsed balloons and radar reflectors."

== Legacy ==
Implementation of Mogul's experimental infrasound detection of nuclear tests exist today in ground-based detectors, part of so-called Geophysical MASINT (measurement and signal intelligence). In 2013, this world-wide network of sound detectors picked up the large explosion of the Chelyabinsk meteor in Russia. The strength of the sound waves was used to estimate the size of the explosion.
