= Battle of Ramnagar =

1848 battle of the Second Anglo-Sikh War in northwestern India

- Part of the Second Anglo-Sikh War
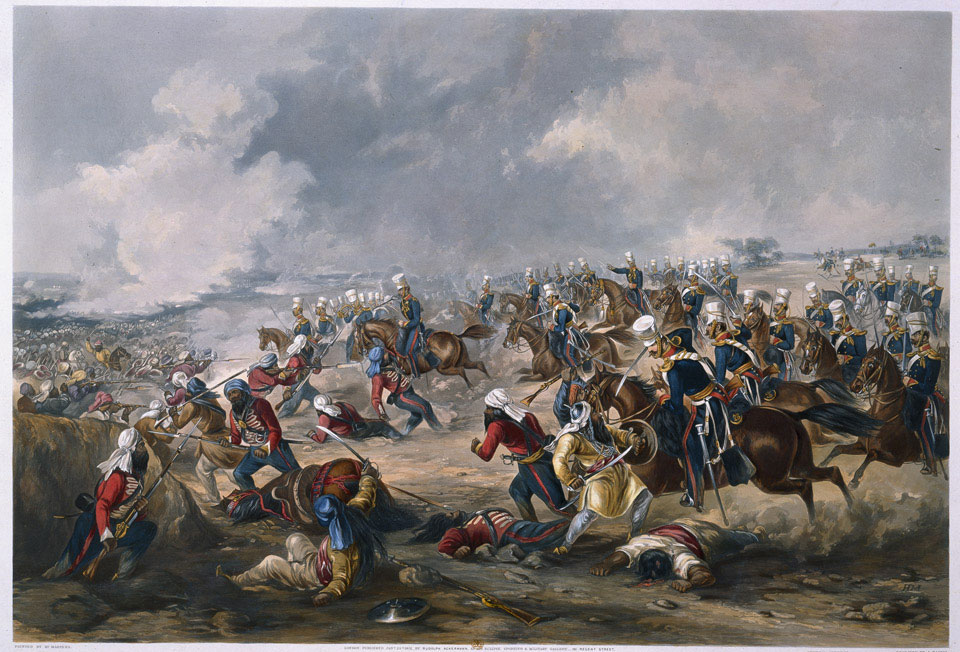
- Charge of the 14th Light Dragoons at the Battle of Ramnagar, 22 November 1848
| Date | 22 November 1848 |
| Location | Ramnagar, Gujranwala District, Punjab 32°19′N 73°50′E |
| Result | Sikh victory |

Belligerents
| Sikh Empire | (United Kingdom of Great Britain and Ireland) British Empire: British East India Company |

Commanders and leaders
| Sher Singh | (United Kingdom of Great Britain and Ireland) Sir Hugh Gough (United Kingdom of Great Britain and Ireland) Charles Cureton † |

Strength
| 23,000 men | Unknown |

Casualties and losses
| Unknown | 26 killed or missing 59 wounded |
- Location within Punjab Pakistan Ramnagar (Pakistan)

The Battle of Ramnagar (sometimes referred to as the Battle of Rumnuggur) was fought on 22 November 1848 between the forces of the British Empire (including the British East India Company) and the Sikh Empire during the Second Anglo-Sikh War. The British were led by Sir Hugh Gough, while the Sikhs were led by Raja Sher Singh Attariwalla. The Sikhs repelled an attempted British surprise attack.

== Background ==
Following the Sikh defeat in the First Anglo-Sikh War, British Commissioners and Political Agents had effectively ruled the Punjab, using the Sikh Khalsa Army to maintain order and implement British policy. There was much unrest over this arrangement and the other galling terms of the peace treaty, not least within the Khalsa which believed it had been betrayed rather than defeated in the first war.

The second war broke out in April 1848, when a popular uprising in the city of Multan forced its ruler, Dewan Mulraj, into rebellion. The British Governor-General of Bengal, Lord Dalhousie, initially ordered only a small contingent of the Bengal Army under General Whish to suppress the outbreak (partly for reasons of economy, and partly to avoid a major campaign during the hot weather and Monsoon season). He also ordered several detachments of the Khalsa to reinforce Whish. The largest detachment, of 3,300 cavalry and 900 infantry, was commanded by Sher Singh Attariwalla. Several junior Political Agents viewed this development with alarm, as Sher Singh's father, Chattar Singh Attariwalla, the Governor of Hazara to the north of the Punjab, was openly plotting rebellion.

On 14 September, Sher Singh rebelled. Whish was forced to lift the siege of Multan and retire. Nevertheless, Sher Singh and Mulraj (the Hindu ruler of a largely Muslim city of Multan) did not join forces. The two leaders conferred at a temple outside the city, where both prayed and it was agreed that Mulraj would supply some funds from his treasury, while Sher Singh moved north to join his forces with those of his father. This was not immediately possible, as Chattar Singh's army was confined to Hazara by Moslem tribesmen fighting under British officers. Instead, Sher Singh moved a few miles north and began fortifying the crossings of the Chenab River, while awaiting developments. His army was swelled by deserters from those regiments of the Khalsa which had not yet rebelled, and by discharged former soldiers.

== Battle ==
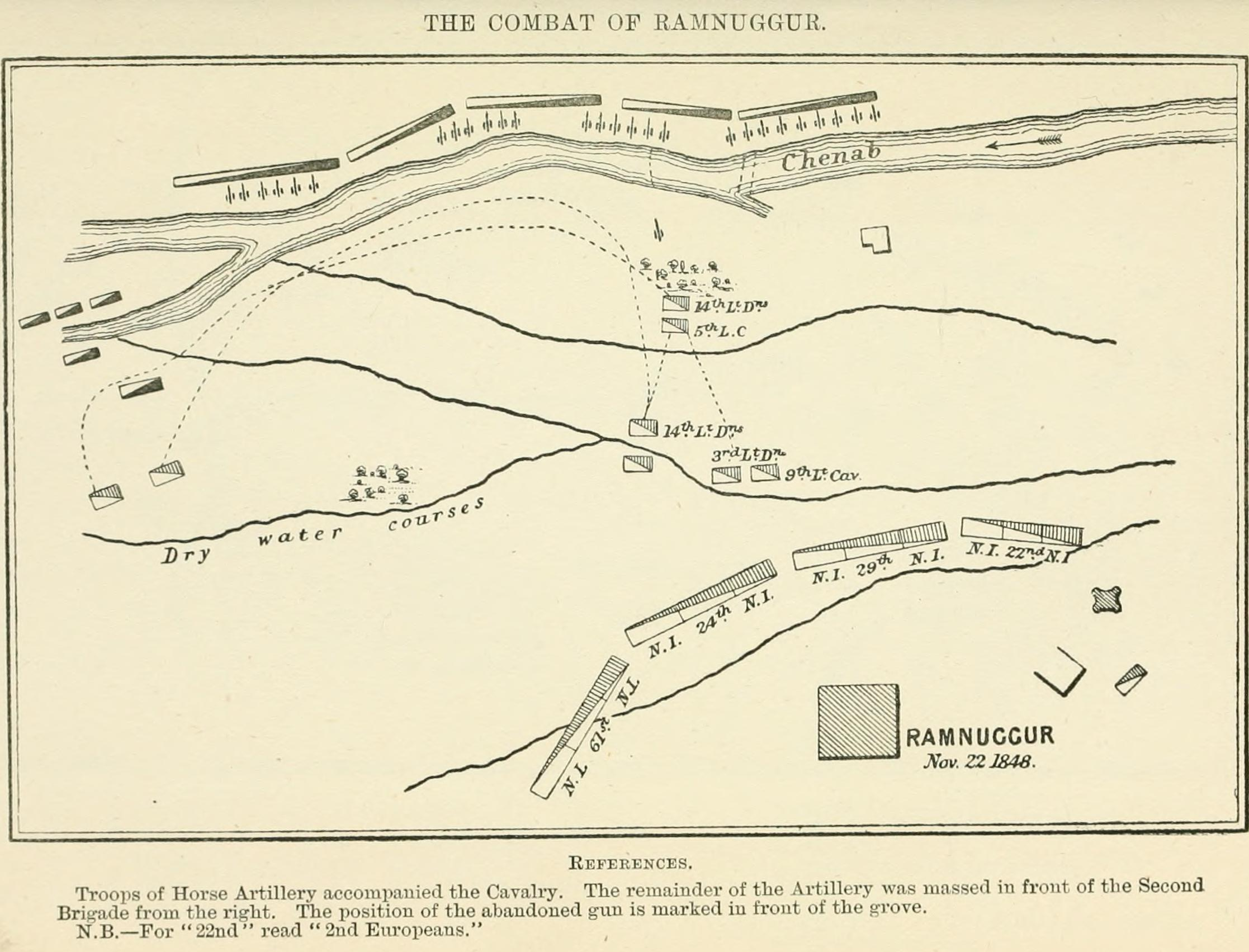
Map of the battle

By November, the British had at last assembled a large army on the frontier of the Punjab, under the Commander-in-Chief, General Sir Hugh Gough. Gough had been criticised for his unvarying frontal attacks during the First Anglo-Sikh War, which had led to heavy British casualties and some near disasters.

In the early hours of the morning of 22 November, Gough ordered a force of cavalry and horse artillery, with a single infantry brigade, to move to the Chenab crossing near Ramnagar (In present-day Pakistan), apparently intending to capture the position by surprise. The Sikhs occupied strong positions on both banks of the river and on an island in mid-stream. The river was only a narrow stream, but the wide bed it occupied during the monsoon season was treacherous soft sand, in which cavalry and artillery could become bogged down.

At dawn, the British force assembled opposite the fords. The 3rd Light Dragoons and 8th Bengal Light Cavalry drove some Sikhs back across the river from positions on the east bank. At this point, hitherto concealed Sikh batteries opened fire. The British cavalry had difficulty extricating themselves from the soft ground. Gough's horse artillery was outgunned and forced to retire, leaving behind a 6-pounder gun which had become bogged down. The brigade commander, Sir Colin Campbell, called up troops to retrieve the gun but was over-ruled by Gough.

Sher Singh sent 3,000 horsemen across the fords to take advantage of the British check. Gough ordered the main body of his cavalry (the 14th Light Dragoons and the 5th Bengal Light Cavalry) to attack them. These drove back the Sikh horsemen but Gough's cavalry pursuing them down the river bank was hit by heavy artillery fire. The Sikh cavalry also turned about and hit the 5th Light Cavalry, causing heavy casualties.

The Commanding Officer of the 14th Light Dragoons, Lieutenant-colonel William Havelock, led another charge, apparently without orders. He and his leading troopers were surrounded and cut down. After a third charge failed, Brigadier Charles Robert Cureton, the commander of the cavalry division to which the troops belonged, galloped up and ordered a retreat. He himself was then killed by musket fire.

== Aftermath ==
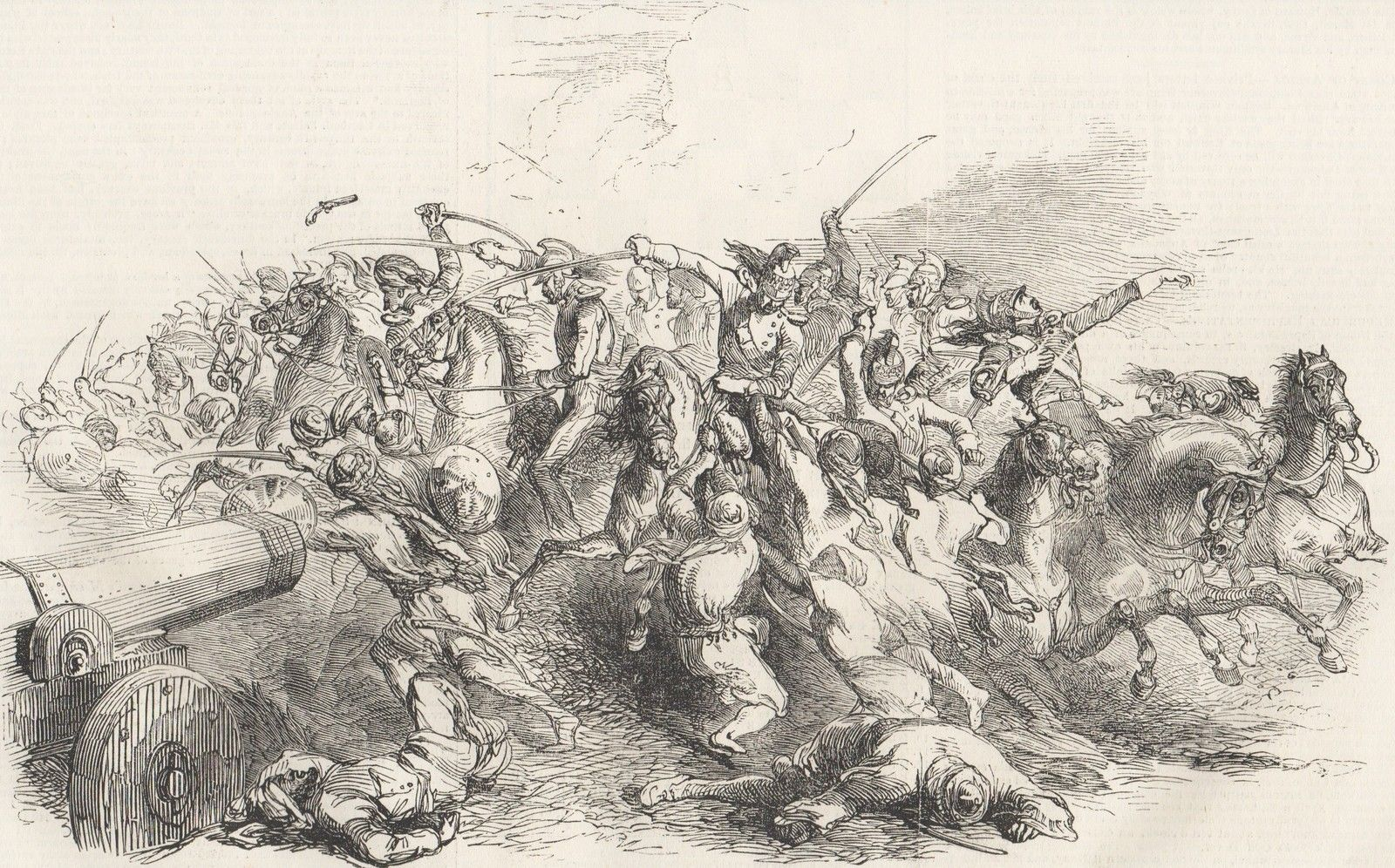
Illustration of Cureton's death

Official British casualties, were 26 killed or missing and 59 wounded. Sikh morale was boosted by their victory over Campbell's force. Following the battle, Sher Singh sent the British a note which claimed the Sikhs would offer to cease hostilities if the British agreed to withdraw from Lahore; "No notice was taken of this offer". The British were victorious during the Battle of Sadullapur which followed.

Sher Singh had skillfully used every advantage of ground and preparation. Although the Sikh forces had been driven from their vulnerable positions on the east bank of the Chenab, their main positions were intact, they had undoubtedly repulsed a British attack, and the morale of Sher Singh's army was boosted. On the British side, several shortcomings were obvious. There had been little reconnaissance or other attempts to gain information on the Sikh dispositions. Gough and Havelock had both ordered foolish or reckless charges. Cureton had a reputation from the First Sikh War as a steady and capable officer, and ought to have been in command from the start.

== Order of battle ==
=== British regiment ===
- 3rd King's Own Light Dragoons
- 9th Queen's Royal Light Dragoons (Lancers)
- 14th the King's Light Dragoons
- 24th Foot
- 29th Foot
- 61st Foot

=== British Indian Army regiments ===
- 1st Bengal Light Cavalry
- 5th Bengal Light Cavalry
- 6th Bengal Light Cavalry
- 9th Bengal Light Cavalry
- 2nd European Light Infantry
- 6th Bengal Native Infantry
- 15th Bengal Native Infantry
- 20th Bengal Native Infantry
- 25th Bengal Native Infantry
- 30th Bengal Native Infantry
- 31st Bengal Native Infantry
- 36th Bengal Native Infantry
- 45th Bengal Native Infantry
- 46th Bengal Native Infantry
- 56th Bengal Native Infantry
- 69th Bengal Native Infantry
- 70th Bengal Native Infantry

== Bibliography ==
- Chaurasia, Radhey Shyam (2002). History of Modern India, 1707 A. D. to 2000 A. D. Atlantic Publishers & Distributors. ISBN 81-269-0085-7.
- Farwell, Byron (1973). Queen Victoria's Little Wars. Wordsworth Military Library. ISBN 1-84022-216-6.
- Dupuy, Richard Ernest; Dupuy, Trevor Nevitt (1993). The Harper encyclopedia of military history: from 3500 BC to the present. HarperCollins. ISBN 978-0-06-270056-8.
- Greenwood, Adrian (2015). Victoria's Scottish Lion: The Life of Colin Campbell, Lord Clyde. UK: History Press. p. 496. ISBN 978-0-75095-685-7. Archived from the original on 2016-02-21.
- Hunter, William Wilson (1881). The Imperial Gazetteer of India. Trübner. p. 542.
- Raugh, Harold E. (2004). The Victorians at war, 1815-1914: an encyclopedia of British military history (illustrated ed.). ABC-CLIO. pp. 299–301. ISBN 1-57607-925-2.
