= Mohmand Expeditions (1851–1852) =

Mohmand Expeditions 1851–1852
Date	1851–1852
Location	North-West Frontier Province, British India
Result	British victory

Belligerents
British Empire	Mohmand Tribesmen

Commanders and leaders
Brig. Sir C. Campbell	Unknown

Strength
First Expedition: 159 Second Expedition: 600	Unknown

Casualties and losses
First Expedition: 4 killed, 5 wounded Second Expedition: 2 killed, 8 injured	Unknown

The Mohmand Expeditions were two British Indian military expeditions to the North-West Frontier Province. In the first British expedition against the Mohmand tribes, British forces were repulsed by tribal resistance and compelled to withdraw. A second, larger expedition was subsequently mounted, ultimately defeating the Mohmand tribes.
