= University of Maryland Eastern Shore =

Historically Black university in Princess Anne, Maryland, US

- University of Maryland Eastern Shore seal
- Motto: Facta, Non Verba
- Motto in English: Deeds, Not Words
- Type: Public historically black land-grant research university
- Established: 1886; 140 years ago
- Parent institution: University System of Maryland
- Academic affiliations: TMSF; Space-grant
- Endowment: $26.2 million (2017)
- President: Heidi M. Anderson
- Provost: Rondall Allen
- Academic staff: 335
- Administrative staff: 511
- Undergraduates: 2,467 (fall 2024)
- Postgraduates: 696 (fall 2024)
- Location: Princess Anne, Maryland, U.S. 38.212°N 75.685°W
- Campus: Rural, 1,138 acres (461 ha)
- Colors: Maroon and gray
- Nickname: Hawks
- Sporting affiliations: NCAA Division I – MEAC, ECAC
- Mascots: Harry the Hawk & HH3
- Website: www.umes.edu
- University of Maryland Eastern Shore
- U.S. National Register of Historic Places
- U.S. Historic district
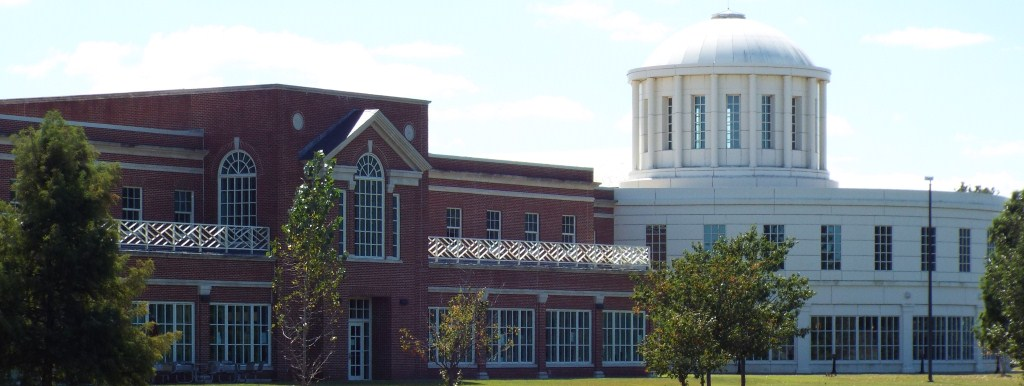
- Student Services Center /at the University of Maryland Eastern Shore

- Location within Maryland Location within the United States
- Location: 1 Backbone Rd., Princess Anne, Maryland
- Coordinates: 38°12′36″N 75°41′8″W
- Built: 1886
- Architects: Booth, W. Wilson; Dashiell, J. Roland & Sons, et al.
- Architectural style: Colonial Revival, Classical Revival, et al.
- NRHP reference No.: 05001021
- Added to NRHP: September 16, 2005

The University of Maryland Eastern Shore (UMES) is a public historically black land-grant research university in Princess Anne, Maryland, United States. It is part of the University System of Maryland. It is classified among "Research Colleges and Universities". It was established as Delaware Conference Academy. It has also been known as Princess Anne Academy and other names during its evolution.

== History ==
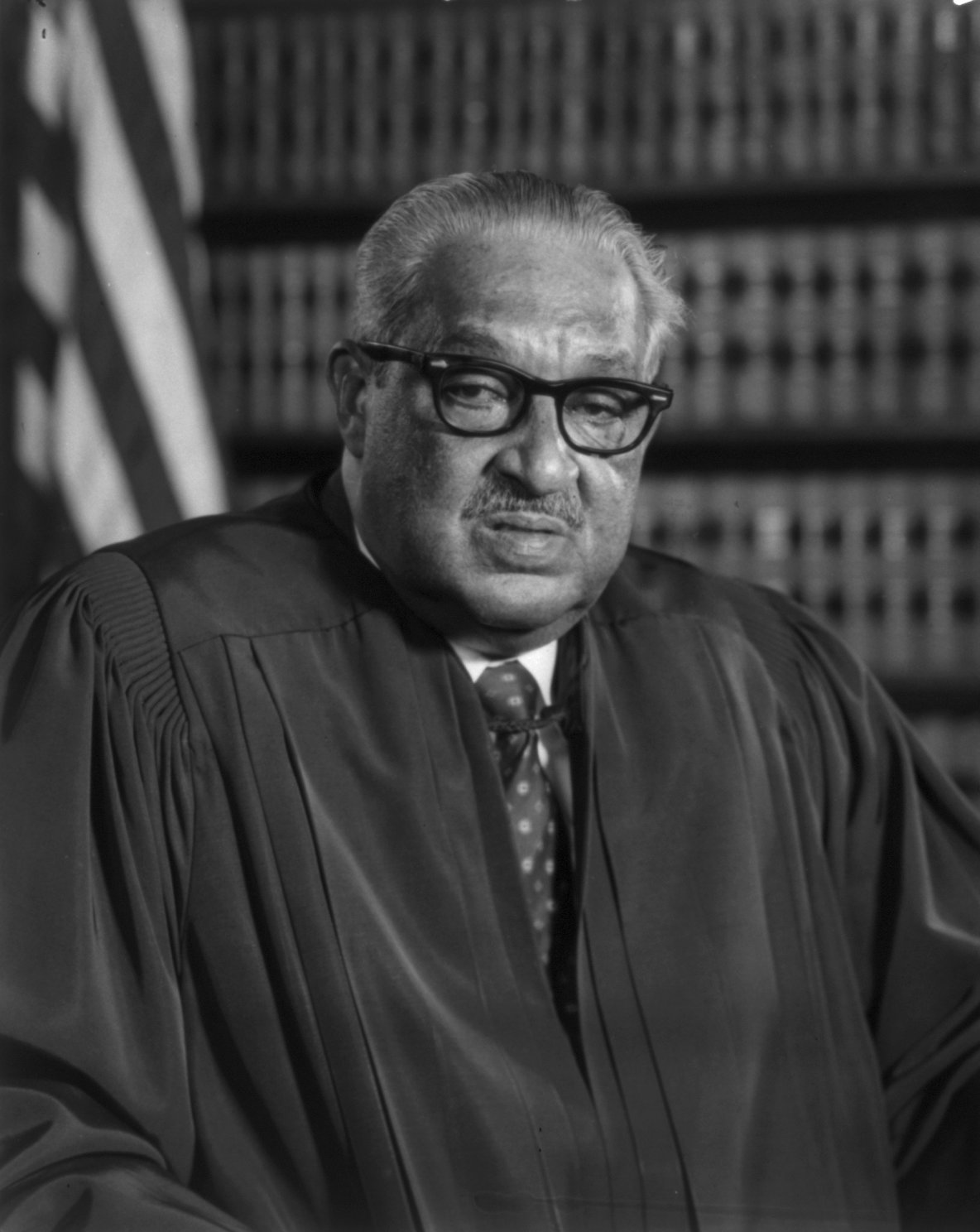
UMES is a member of the Thurgood Marshall College Fund

The University of Maryland Eastern Shore has been known by a series of names reflective of its location, evolving role, and mission over a period spanning three centuries. It opened September 13, 1886, under the auspices of the Delaware Conference of the Methodist Episcopal Church. Benjamin and Portia Bird welcomed nine students that first day to a converted farmhouse on 16 acres. The school was at first envisioned as a preparatory school for the private Centenary Biblical Institute in Baltimore, which was affiliated with the Methodist Episcopal Church. In 1890 it changed its name to Morgan College to honor the first chairman of its board of trustees; and is now the public Morgan State University. By the end of the first academic year, 37 students were enrolled in the Delaware Conference Academy in Princess Anne.

Because of segregation in the state, African-American students could not enroll in the Maryland Agriculture College in College Park, which offered advanced instruction in farming techniques and related trades commonplace in the late 19th century. Congress enacted the Second Morrill Act of 1890, which required states to establish colleges for African-American students in order to gain or continue to receive land-grant funds. The state of Maryland formalized a partnership with Morgan to underwrite "land-grant" education for African-Americans on Maryland's lower Eastern Shore.

By the turn of the 20th century, the school was known widely as Princess Anne Academy, although in some circles it was informally referred to as Morgan's "industrial branch." The public-private partnership between the state and Morgan inspired another alternative name, at least according to state government archives: the Eastern Shore Branch of Maryland Agriculture College.

In the midst of the Great Depression, Maryland courts directed the state to admit qualified African-American applicants to its publicly funded law school in Baltimore. Historians believe this ruling led the state to convert Princess Anne Academy to a public institution.

Fifty years after opening, the school formally passed from church control to state ownership with the first of four $25,000 installment payments – just as it was developing as a baccalaureate degree-granting college. Maryland's public flagship campus in College Park was designated its administrative agency. In 1948, the Eastern Shore Branch of the University of Maryland, then alternately known as Princess Anne College, was renamed Maryland State College, a division of the University of Maryland.

Maryland State College became the University of Maryland Eastern Shore on July 1, 1970. Today it is one of 12 University System of Maryland public institutions of higher education. In addition to 745 acres on its main campus in Princess Anne, UMES also operates a 385-acre research farm in southern Somerset County, and the Paul S. Sarbanes Coastal Ecology Center on eight acres near Assateague Island in neighboring Worcester County.

UMES offers instruction in 37 undergraduate areas of study, as well as 15 master's degree and 8 doctoral degree programs; 27 are accredited.

In 2020, MacKenzie Scott donated $20 million to UMES. In 2025, she donated an additional $38 million, the largest single gift in the university's history.

== Academics ==
The university comprises five schools:

- School of Agricultural and Natural Sciences
- School of Education, Social Sciences, and the Arts
- School of Business and Technology
- School of Pharmacy and Health Professions
- School of Graduate Studies

Student body composition as of Fall 2023
Race and ethnicity	Total
Black	78%
White	8%
Two or more races	5%
Hispanic	4%
International student	3%
Asian	1%
Unknown	1%
Economic diversity
Low-income (Note: The percentage of students who received an income-based federal Pell grant intended for low-income students.)	53%
Affluent (Note: The percentage of students who are a part of the American middle class at the bare minimum.)	47%

== Athletics ==
UMES was one of the founding members of the Mid-Eastern Athletic Conference in 1970. The school left the MEAC in 1979 but re-joined in 1981 and has been a member ever since. The Hawks compete in 15 sports at the Division I level: seven men's and eight women's. Prior to 1970, the university was a member of the Central Intercollegiate Athletic Association in Division II.

The school was once a powerhouse in black college football, producing five undefeated seasons between 1947 and 1960. As at many smaller colleges, the high costs associated with operating an NCAA Division I football program and complying with the federal Title IX gender-equity law became too much of a burden. The team was disbanded following the 1979 season.

In 1948, Maryland State College and Albright College played one of the first intercollegiate football games between an historically black institution and a majority-white institution.

After a consultant produced a study in 2012 on the feasibility of reinstating football, President Dr. Juliette B. Bell put together a task force to assess whether football should be reinstated. On February 28, 2013, they decided to continue without football, but noted that the topic "may be revisited" in five years. NFL player and coach Art Shell attended UMES.

UMES is tied with Florida State for the most alumni appearing in a single Super Bowl game. In the 1968 game (Super Bowl III) between the New York Jets and the Baltimore Colts, UMES was represented by four alumni: Earl Christy (1961–1964), Johnny Sample (1954–1957), Emerson Boozer (1962–1965), and Charlie Stukes (1963–1967).

The UMES women's bowling team won the NCAA Bowling Championship in 2012 in Ohio against Fairleigh Dickinson University and in 2008 in Omaha, Nebraska, against Arkansas State University. They won the series 4-2 (in a best of 7 match). The team was led by All-Tournament players Jessica Worsley (who was named the tournament MVP) and Maria Rodriguez. With the series win, UMES became the first HBCU to win a women's NCAA national championship. The UMES women won their second 2011 NCAA Bowling Championship in Taylor, Michigan against Vanderbilt University, also winning the series 4-2 (in a best of 7 match). Kristina Frahm (named tournament MVP) and Maria Rodriguez were named to the All-Tournament team en route to their victory. That season, along with the NCAA Championship, UMES also won the USBC Team Championships over Lindenwood University, as well as the MEAC Championship. In 2007, the women's bowling team came in second at the NCAA National Championship in Orlando, Florida and fell to Vanderbilt in a 4–3 series. The team was led by All-Tournament players Marion Singleton and Jessica Worsley. The UMES women's bowling team won the MEAC Championship in 2000, 2006, 2007, and 2008.

UMES men's basketball is coached by Jason Crafton. The school led the nation in scoring during the 1973–1974 season with 97.6 points per game, including future NBA picks Rubin Collins, Talvin Skinner, William Gordon and Joe Pace. The team defeated Manhattan College 84–81 in the first round of the 1974 NIT and fell to Jacksonville University 85–83 in the quarterfinals. The team has never played in the NCAA Division I men's basketball tournament.

During the 2010–11 season, UMES had a men's and women's basketball player surpass the 1,000-career point mark. Hillary Haley passed the mark on the men's side with a 24-point performance against Coppin State on February 19, including his first season at St. Bonaventure. On the women's side, Casey Morton scored 10 points against Savannah State to surpass the mark, finishing with 1,230 in four years with the Lady Hawks. The next season, Adobi Agbasi finished third in Division I in blocks per game with 3.72 per contest, becoming the all-time shot-blocker in UMES women's basketball history with 239 total blocks, achieving that mark on March 1, 2012, against Savannah State.

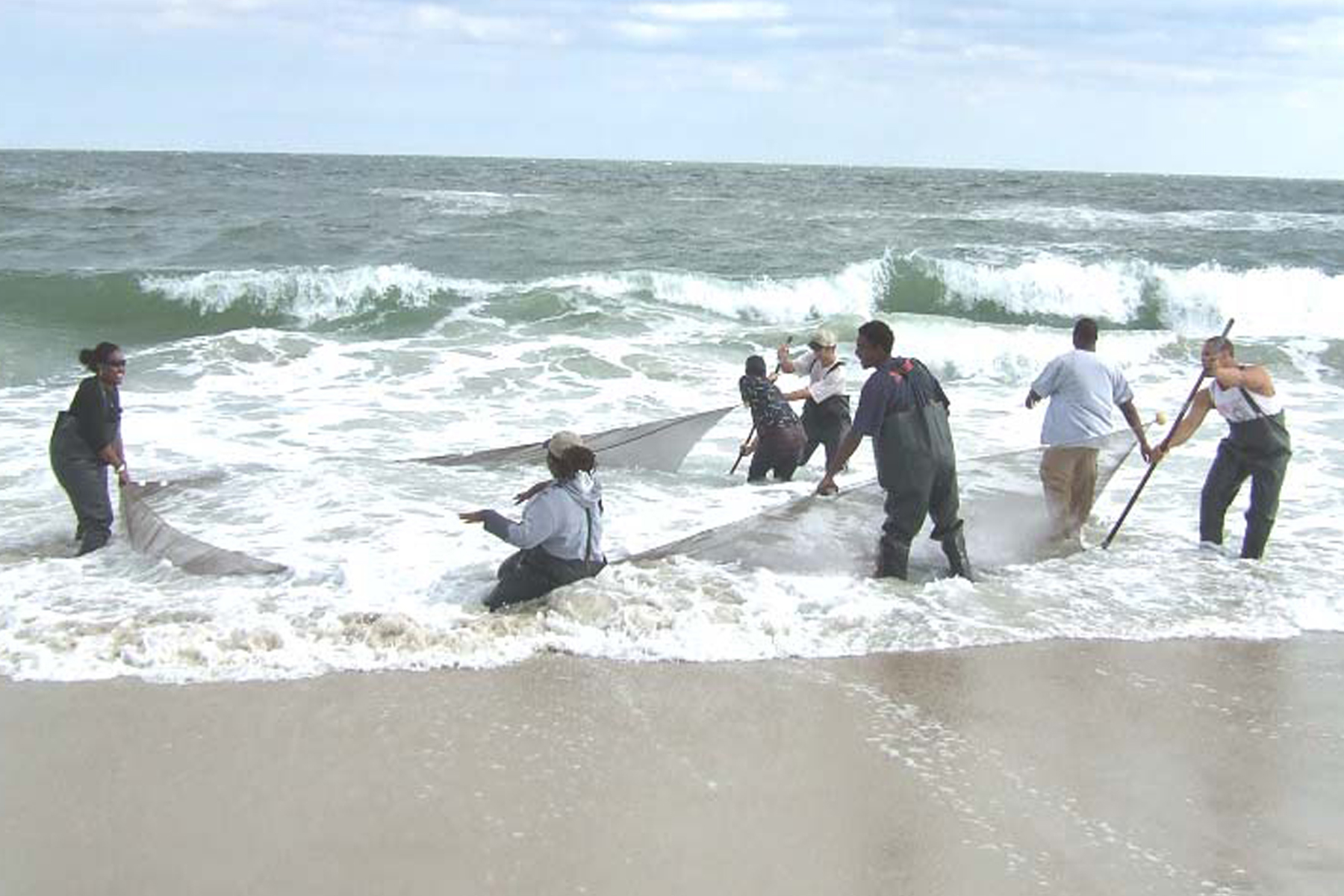
UMES students working with NOAA at Assateague Island

In 2011, the Hawks men's outdoor track team was ranked third in the Mid-Atlantic Region by the U.S. Track & Field and Cross Country Coaches Association, and subsequently was the highest ranked team in the state of Maryland. The following season, three UMES outdoor track athletes earned All-America status: Lénora Guion-Firmin earned First Team in the 400-meter dash, later earning a spot with the French 4x400-meter team in the 2012 Summer Olympics, while Andre Walsh and Vanessa Henry, in the men's 400-meter hurdles and women's shot put, earned Second Team. In 2014, The men's side won the MEAC Cross Country Championships.

The UMES women's volleyball team won its first MEAC championship in the history of the school in November 2011 with a win over Florida A&M in the title game, earning its first NCAA Tournament berth ever. The Hawks fell to eventual national champion UCLA in the first round. In 2012, the team repeated as MEAC champions with another five-set win over Florida A&M to advance to the NCAAs again, falling to 4-seed Nebraska in its first match. The team has won the MEAC Northern Division each of the past six years, combining to go 61–3 in conference regular season matches in that time, and also holds the longest current home-winning streak in Division I, being victorious in its last 30 matches at home.

== Notable alumni ==
Name	Class year	Notability	Reference(s)
David Banner (Lavell Crump)		Rapper, studied Master of Education	
Emerson Boozer	1965	former NFL player	
Roger Brown	1960	former NFL player	
Earl Christy	1967	former NFL player	
Clarence Clemons		Professional saxophonist with Bruce Springsteen & The E Street Band	
Linda Y. Cureton	2020	PhD, former NASA CIO	
James Duncan		former NFL player	
Brasheedah Elohim		American-Israeli women's professional basketball player	
Carl Hairston	1975	former NFL player and coach	
Merrecia James	2008	track and field middle distance runner from Jamaica, former member of UMES track team, and competed in North American Central American Caribbean (NACAC) cross country meets and world championship cross country meets	
Charles Mays	1964	Olympic long jumper and New Jersey State Assemblyman	
Wanda Peters		NASA administrator and member of the Senior Executive Service	
Earl S. Richardson	1965	Morgan State University President	
Johnny Sample	1958	former NFL player	
Art Shell	1968	Pro Football Hall of Fame player and former NFL head coach of the Oakland Raiders and former NFL executive	
Ira Smith	1990	former minor league baseball player. He had the highest batting average in Division I in 1989 and 1990.	
Charlie Stukes	1967	former NFL player	
Billy Thompson	1969	former NFL player for the Denver Broncos	
Joe Williams		American football player	

== Notable faculty ==
- Heidi M. Anderson
- Mike Hall
- Mignon Holland Anderson
- Vernon McCain
- Ulysses S. McPherson
- Jack Thomas
- Frank Trigg
