= Edwin M. Kirton =

American military intelligence officer (1909–1992)

- Kirton in U.S. Air Force uniform, 1951
- Born: December 3, 1909; Helena, Montana, U.S.
- Died: December 6, 1992 (aged 83)
- Military career
- Allegiance: United States
- Branch: United States Army Air Forces; United States Air Force
- Rank: Colonel
- Nickname: "Ned"
- Unit: Eighth Air Force
- Conflicts: World War II
- Awards: Legion of Merit; Bronze Star Medal; Air Medal; Army Commendation Medal

Edwin Malcolm Kirton (December 3, 1909 – December 6, 1992) was an American Air Force colonel and military intelligence officer. During World War II, he served with B-29 bomber units in China and the Mariana Islands. He later directed intelligence operations for the Eighth Air Force, served as the United States air attaché in Moscow, and became inspector general of the Defense Intelligence Agency.

Kirton was connected to the Army Air Forces' handling of the 1947 Roswell incident.

== Early life and military career ==
Kirton was born Edwin Malcolm Kirton on December 3, 1909, at St. John's Hospital in Helena, Montana. He worked as a commercial airline pilot during the 1930s and entered military service during World War II. By December 1942, Kirton was serving as the public relations officer at the Army flying school in Victorville, California.

In March 1944, Kirton went overseas with the 58th Bombardment Wing, which operated B-29 bombers from bases in India and China. He helped establish an advanced wing headquarters at Hsinching, China, and took part in efforts to recover aircrews forced down behind enemy lines in China and Manchuria. His duties also included counterespionage work with Chinese intelligence services. Kirton was sent to the Chinese Communist headquarters at Yan'an to negotiate the placement of American intelligence and communications personnel. In August 1944, he became chief of the intelligence section supporting B-29 operations in China. He later served as assistant chief of staff for intelligence on the staff of Major General Roger M. Ramey in the Mariana Islands.

Kirton returned to the United States in November 1945 with the 58th Bombardment Wing. The wing moved to Fort Worth, Texas, in May 1946 and formed the nucleus of the reactivated Eighth Air Force. His wartime decorations included the Legion of Merit, the Bronze Star Medal, Air Medal, Army Commendation Medal, and the Asiatic-Pacific campaign ribbon with seven battle stars.

== Eighth Air Force and the Roswell incident ==
Kirton was serving with Eighth Air Force headquarters in Fort Worth when debris recovered near Roswell, New Mexico, was brought to the base in July 1947. On July 8, the FBI's Dallas office sent a teletype to Director J. Edgar Hoover and the bureau's Cincinnati office concerning an object described as a flying disc. The message stated that the object was hexagonal, was suspended from a balloon by a cable, and resembled a high-altitude weather balloon with a radar reflector. It also reported that the material was being transported to Wright Field for examination.

The officer's name is redacted in the copy published by the FBI. In his 2005 book Majic Eyes Only, author Ryan S. Wood identified the Eighth Air Force officer who supplied the information as Kirton. A later Air Force investigation concluded that the recovered debris most likely came from a balloon train associated with Project Mogul, a classified program intended to detect Soviet nuclear tests.

In August 1948, Kirton was appointed assistant chief of staff for intelligence of the Eighth Air Force, succeeding Colonel Guilford R. Montgomery. He was promoted to lieutenant colonel in 1949 and to colonel in 1951.

== Air attaché in Moscow ==
Kirton studied Russian at the Army Language School at the Presidio of Monterey in 1957. After serving for two years at the Pentagon, he was assigned to the United States embassy in Moscow as air attaché in 1958.

According to the South Florida Sun Sentinel, Kirton's duties in Moscow included planning and directing intelligence collection operations concerning Soviet air weapons systems and advising the United States ambassador on aviation and space matters.

Kirton's assignment coincided with a period of increasing tension between the United States and the Soviet Union. On May 1, 1960, Soviet forces shot down a United States U-2 reconnaissance aircraft piloted by Francis Gary Powers. The incident led to the collapse of a planned summit meeting between President Dwight D. Eisenhower and Soviet premier Nikita Khrushchev.

Later that year, Soviet officials accused Kirton of organizing an intelligence network and photographing military and industrial sites while traveling in the Soviet Union. The Soviet Foreign Ministry ordered him to leave the country in August 1960.

A 1992 account of Kirton's career connected the expulsion to the political fallout from the U-2 incident and reported that Khrushchev gave Kirton 48 hours to leave the Soviet Union. Contemporary news reports stated that his assistant, Captain Irving T. McDonald, was also accused of improper intelligence activity but initially received only a warning.

Kirton said that the accusations came as a surprise and maintained that he had conducted himself properly. The United States embassy rejected the Soviet allegations. Contemporary American officials also described his expulsion as retaliation for the recent removal of a Soviet diplomat from the United States on espionage charges.

== Defense Intelligence Agency and later life ==
After returning from Moscow in 1960, Kirton was appointed deputy director of collections in the Air Force Office of Intelligence. In 1961, he was transferred to the Department of Defense and helped organize the newly established Defense Intelligence Agency. He later served as the agency's inspector general and remained there until 1965.

Kirton moved to Lighthouse Point, Florida, in 1965. That year, Mayor John McGinn appointed him to the city's Fire and Police Commission.

Kirton was married to Lera Kirton. He died of cancer on December 6, 1992, three days after his 83rd birthday.
