= Heidi M. Anderson =

U.S. academic administrator

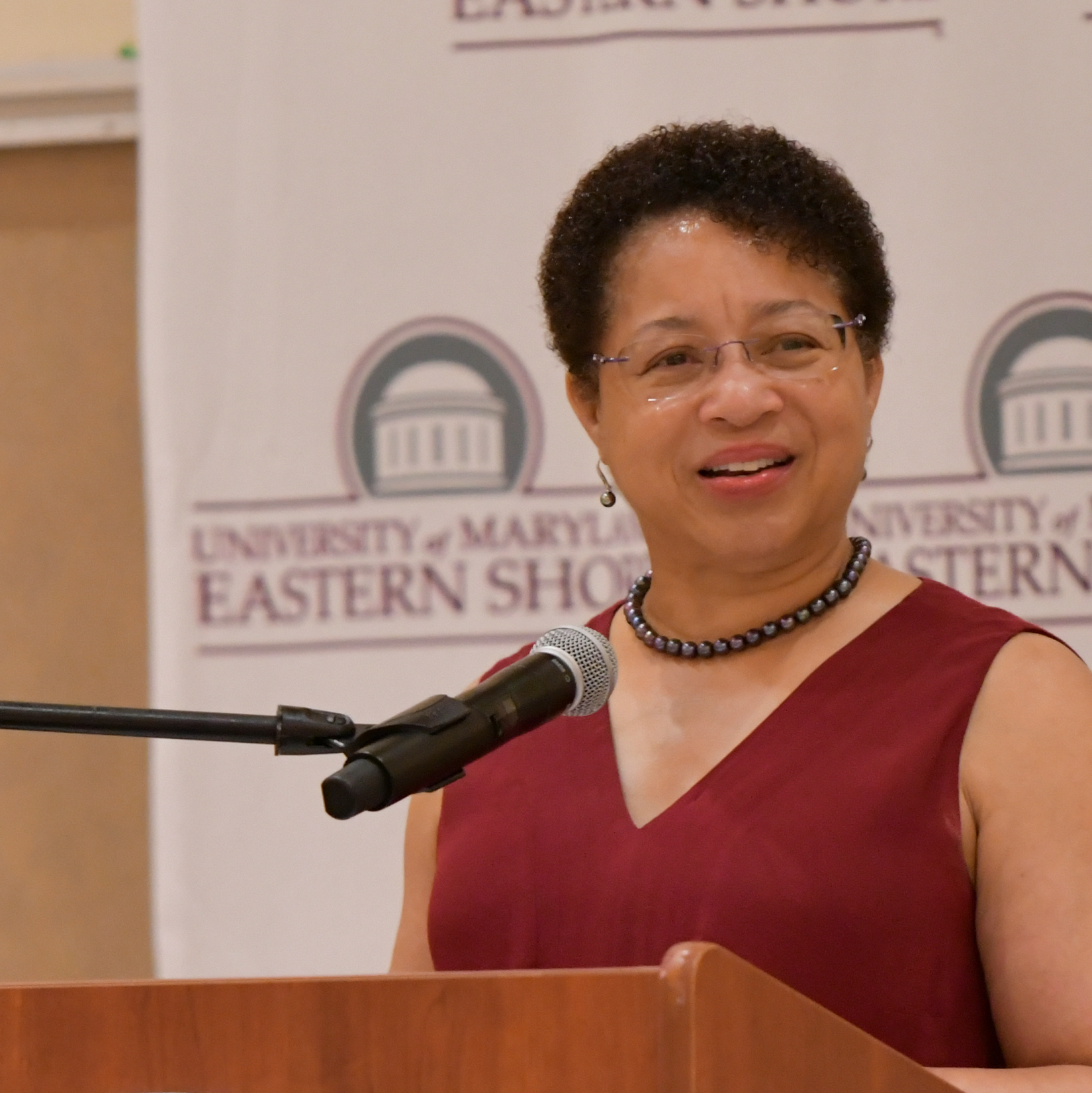
- Anderson in 2021

President of the University of Maryland Eastern Shore
- Incumbent
- Assumed office September 1, 2018
- Preceded by: Juliette Bell

Personal details
- Born: Heidi Milia Anderson Gary, Indiana, U.S.
- Education: Purdue University

Heidi Milia Anderson is an American academic administrator serving as the president of the University of Maryland Eastern Shore since September 2018. Under her leadership, the university has received major funding, with $38 Million in total fundraising in her first four years, up 33% since 2020. She was previously the provost at Texas A&M University–Kingsville and the University of the Sciences.

== Life ==
Anderson is from Gary, Indiana. She completed a B.S. in pharmacy (1978) and a Ph.D. in pharmacy administration (1986) at the Purdue University College of Pharmacy. In 1982, she earned a M.S. in education at the Purdue University School of Education. Anderson was a first-generation college student. Anderson was the assistant director of the health careers opportunity center in the Purdue University College of Pharmacy from 1978 to 1982.

Anderson served as the assistant dean for education innovation at the University of Kentucky College of Pharmacy from July 2006 to January 2022. At the University of Kentucky, she was the associate provost for faculty affairs from August 2006 to July 2011 and the vice president and associate provost for institution effectiveness from July 2011 to June 2013. Kumble R. Subbaswamy served as a mentor of Anderson. From 1986 to 1989, Anderson was an assistant professor in the health science administration department at the University of Tennessee College of Pharmacy. She joined Auburn University College of Pharmacy in 1989 as an assistant professor in the pharmacy care systems department. Anderson became an associate professor in 1993 and served as a professor and department chair from 1999 to 2002. In 2010, she had won the Distinguished Pharmacy Alumni Award from Purdue University.

Anderson was the provost and vice president of academic affairs at the University of the Sciences from July 2013 to August 2015. From September 2015 to September 2017, she joined the Texas A&M University–Kingsville in September 2015 as provost and vice president of academic affairs. From October 2017 to September 2018, she was the assistant to the president for special projects.

Anderson became the 16th president of the University of Maryland Eastern Shore (UMES) on September 1, 2018, succeeding Juliette Bell. She is the fourth woman in the 21st-century to serve as president of UMES. In 2020, she received the Marylander's Award and Maryland's Top 100 Women honor from the Daily Record. In 2022, Anderson became chair of the American Association of State Colleges and Universities.

== Controversy regarding alleged plagiarism ==
In an investigative report for The Daily Wire, Luke Rosiak published side-by-side textual comparisons showing that Anderson's 1986 Purdue University doctoral dissertation replicated extensive material from earlier works without attribution. The report documented numerous passages copied either verbatim or with slight changes from a 1984 paper on nursing education by Donna E. Larson as well as publications by David H. Jonassen, Robert M. Caldwell, Richard E. Pogue, and Elaine G. Boettcher. The analysis detailed instances where Anderson reproduced source citations while removing the original authors' self-citations, copied summary text verbatim, and used conclusion phrasing identical to Boettcher's prior work.

Following the report, as of October 7, 2025, Anderson is under investigation for plagiarism throughout her career. Further, her university employer previously was and currently is being sued for Anderson's alleged racial bias in hiring and treatment of employees. Anderson filed for defamation against Donna Satterlee, claiming the plagiarism allegations were harmful to her reputation.
