= Linda Y. Cureton =

American businessperson

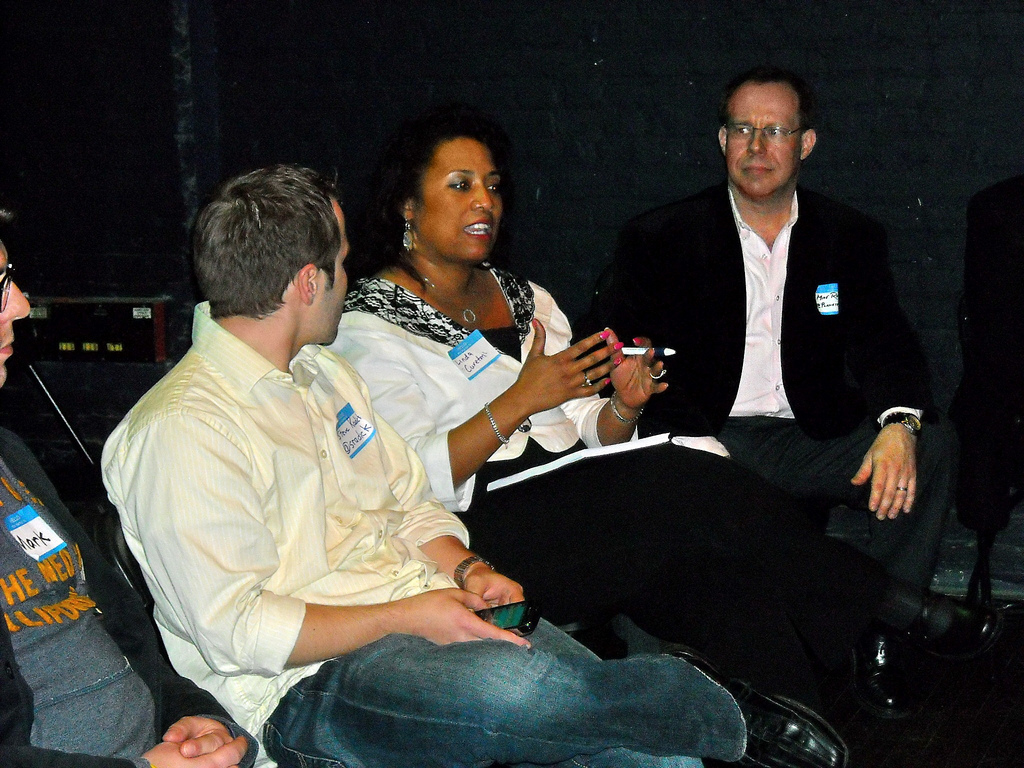
- Cureton as a panelist at Government 2.0 camp in 2009
- Born: 1959 (age 66–67); Bethesda, Maryland
- Citizenship: United States
- Education: Howard University; Johns Hopkins University; University of Maryland Eastern Shore
- Organization(s): Muse Technologies, Inc.
- Known for: First African-American Chief Information Officer, NASA
- Notable work: The Leadership Muse
- Title: Chief Executive Office and Founder
- Spouse: Douglas F. Cureton
- Website: lindacureton.com

Linda Y. Cureton (born 1959 in Bethesda, Maryland) is the chief executive officer and founder of Muse Technologies, Inc. A former NASA CIO, Ms. Cureton launched her company in April 2013.

== Education ==
Cureton attended Washington, DC public schools and was in the first graduating class of Duke Ellington School of the Arts in 1977. In 1980, she graduated from Howard University with a BS in Mathematics. She later received a Master of Science degree and post-Masters advanced certificate in Applied Mathematics at Johns Hopkins University. Cureton earned a Doctor of Philosophy in Organizational Leadership from University of Maryland Eastern Shore in 2020.

== Career ==
Cureton created the NASA CIO blog and helped other federal CIOs with the professional use of social media.

She wrote several articles for Federal Computer Week, FedScoop, and Institute for Electrical and Electronics Engineers and is a monthly contributor to Information Week Government. She currently serves on advisory boards for: the Open Systems Software Institute, the Professional Capture Management Forum, and the DC Youth Orchestra Program. Some of her former professional affiliations have included the Armed Forces Communications and Electronics Association, Gartner Group Information Technology Executive Program, Women in Technology, American Council for Technology, Government Information Technology Executive Council and the Society for Information Management, Advanced Practices Council. She is the author of The Leadership Muse a book that offers lessons for leaders.

== Selected publications ==
- Cureton, Linda Y. (2011). The Leadership Muse: Inspiration for the 21st Century Hero-Leader. Synergy Press. ISBN 978-0-9802209-5-7.
- Cureton, Linda (May 2010). "Innovation: There Is Something New Under the Sun". IT Professional. 12 (3): 54–56. doi:10.1109/MITP.2010.90. S2CID 20465903.
- Cureton, L.M.; Kuttler, J.R. (February 1999). "Eigenvalues of the Laplacian on Regular Polygons and Polygons Resulting from Their Disection". Journal of Sound and Vibration. 220 (1): 83–98. Bibcode:1999JSV...220...83C. doi:10.1006/jsvi.1998.1919.
- Cureton, Linda Yvette (2020). An Examination of the Mediating Effects of Team Behaviors in Complex Adaptive Systems on the Relationship between Complexity Leadership and Support for Innovation (Thesis). ProQuest 2546613546.

== Selected awards and recognitions ==
- 2008 IT Service Management Forum (ITSMF) Heritage Award
- 2009 InformationWeek Government CIO 50
- 2009 Washington Business Journal Women Who Mean Business
- 2011 Minority Enterprise Executive Council 50 Women of Influence and Power Award
- 2011 Federal Computer Week Fed 100
- 2011 Washingtonian Magazine Tech Titans
- 2011 Womensphere Global Leadership Award for Innovation
- 2012 National Urban League of Northern Virginia for Leadership in Science, Technology, Engineering and Mathematics
- 2012 Business Insider 25 Powerful Women Engineers
