= Frederick Markham =

Lieutenant-General Frederick Markham CB
- Born: 16 August 1805; Lewes, East Sussex
- Died: 21 December 1855 (aged 50); Conduit Street, London
- Burial place: Morland, Cumbria
- Military career
- Allegiance: United Kingdom
- Branch: British Army
- Service years: 1824–1855
- Rank: Lieutenant-General
- Conflicts: Lower Canada Rebellion; Second Anglo-Sikh War; Crimean War
- Awards: Companion of the Order of the Bath

Lieutenant-General Frederick Markham CB (16 August 1805 – 21 December 1855) was a British Army officer who served as Adjutant-General in India.

== Military career ==
Born the son of Admiral John Markham and educated at Westminster School, Marham was commissioned as an ensign in the 32nd Regiment of Foot on 13 May 1824. He fought at the Battle of Saint-Denis in November 1837 during the Lower Canada Rebellion and then commanded the 2nd Infantry Brigade at the Siege of Multan in Winter 1848 and at the Battle of Gujrat in February 1849 during the Second Anglo-Sikh War. He served as Adjutant-General in India from April 1854 until December 1854 and was then despatched to command the 2nd Division at the Siege of Sevastopol in Spring 1855 during the Crimean War. He returned to England in September 1855 but died in December 1855.

== Sources ==
- Chichester, Henry Manners (1893). "Markham, Frederick" . In Lee, Sidney (ed.). Dictionary of National Biography. Vol. 36. London: Smith, Elder & Co.

Military offices
Preceded by Armine Mountain	Adjutant-General, India; April 1854 – November 1854	Succeeded by Henry Havelock
