= Harold Kirton =

English cricketer

Personal information
- Full name: Harold Osborne Kirton
- Born: 4 January 1894; Paddington, London, England
- Died: 9 May 1974 (aged 80); Holland-on-Sea, Essex, England
- Batting: Right-handed
- Bowling: Right-arm medium

Domestic team information
- Years: Team
- 1925–1929: Warwickshire

Career statistics
| Competition | First-class |
|---|---|
| Matches | 2 |
| Runs scored | 82 |
| Batting average | 27.33 |
| 100s/50s | –/1 |
| Top score | 51 |
| Balls bowled | – |
| Wickets | – |
| Bowling average | – |
| 5 wickets in innings | – |
| 10 wickets in match | – |
| Best bowling | – |
| Catches/stumpings | –/– |
- Source: Cricinfo, 23 June 2013

Harold Osborne Kirton (4 January 1894 – 9 May 1974) was an English cricketer. Kirton was a right-handed batsman who bowled right-arm medium pace. He was born at Paddington, London.

Kirton made two first-class appearances for Warwickshire, four years apart from one another. The first came in the 1925 County Championship against Surrey at Edgbaston, while the second came in the 1929 County Championship against Middlesex at Lord's. Kirton scored a total of 82 runs in his two matches, top scoring with 52 against Middlesex.

He died at Holland-on-Sea, Essex on 9 May 1974.
