= Charles Cureton (British Army officer) =

British Army officer (1789–1848)

Brigadier-General Charles Cureton CB
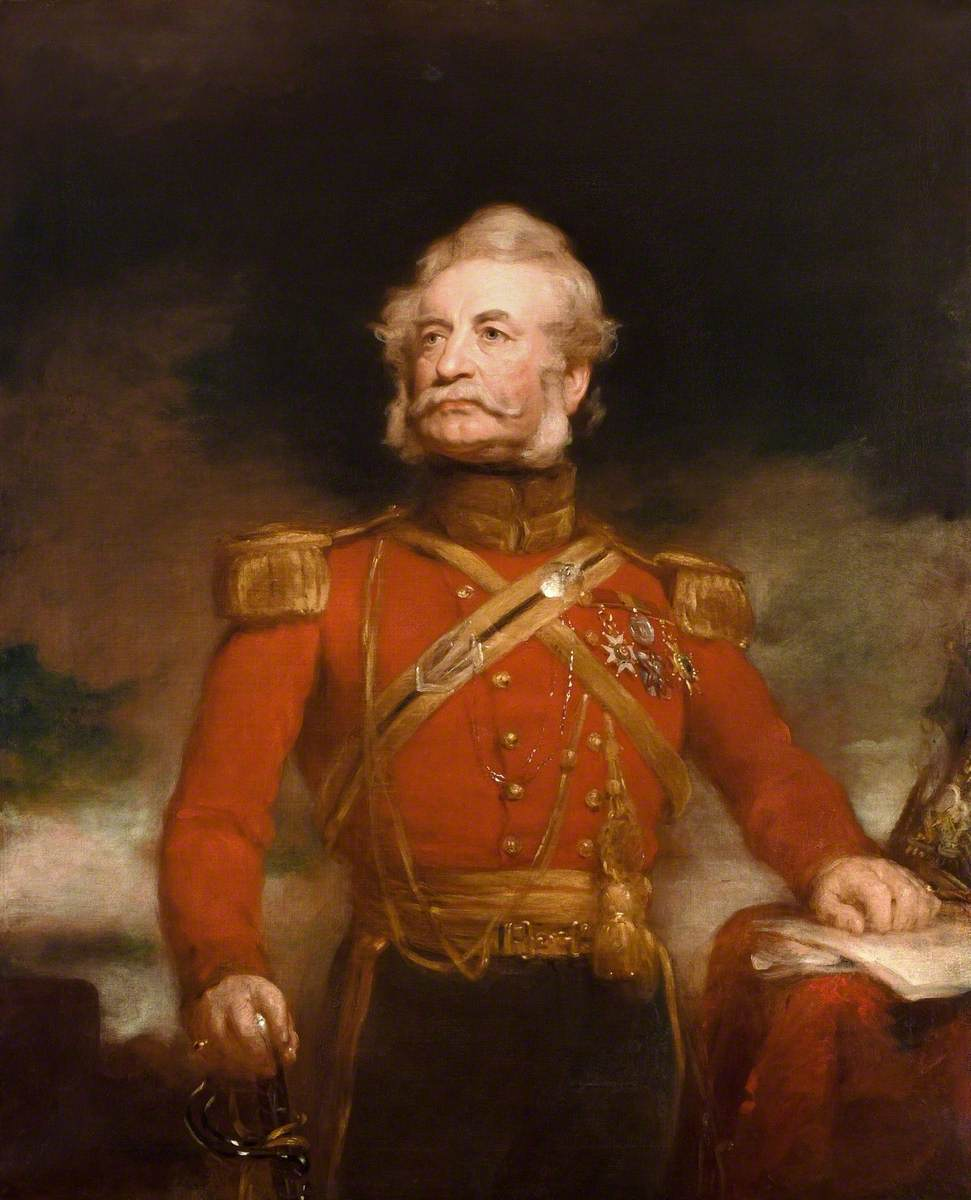
- Portrait by William Bradley, 1844
- Born: 21 October 1789
- Died: 22 November 1848 (aged 59) Rasulnagar, Pakistan
- Allegiance: United Kingdom
- Branch: British Army
- Service years: 1806–1848
- Rank: Brigadier-General
- Commands: 16th Lancers; Adjutant-General of India
- Conflicts: Napoleonic Wars; Peninsular War; Battle of Talavera; Battle of Bussaco; Battle of Fuentes de Oñoro (WIA); Siege of Badajoz; Battle of Salamanca; Battle of Vitoria; Battle of Orthez; Action at Tarbes; Battle of Toulouse; Siege of Bharatpur; First Anglo-Afghan War; Battle of Ghazni; Gwalior campaign; Battle of Maharajpur; First Anglo-Sikh War; Battle of Baddowal; Battle of Aliwal; Battle of Sobraon; Second Anglo-Sikh War; Battle of Ramnagar †
- Awards: Order of the Durrani Empire (Afghanistan)

Brigadier-General Charles Robert Cureton CB (21 October 1789 – 22 November 1848) was a British Army officer who served as Adjutant-General in India.

Cureton was born at Union Street in Southwark, London, the son of Edward Cureton and Henrietta Bill.

== Military career ==
Cureton was commissioned as an ensign in the Shropshire militia on 21 April 1806. He fought at the Battle of Talavera in July 1809, the Battle of Bussaco in September 1810 and the Battle of Fuentes de Oñoro in May 1811 during the Peninsular War. He also saw action at the Siege of Badajoz in April 1812, the Battle of Salamanca in July 1812 and the Battle of Vitoria in June 1813 as well as the Battle of Orthez in February 1814, the Battle of Tarbes in March 1814 and the Battle of Toulouse in April 1814.

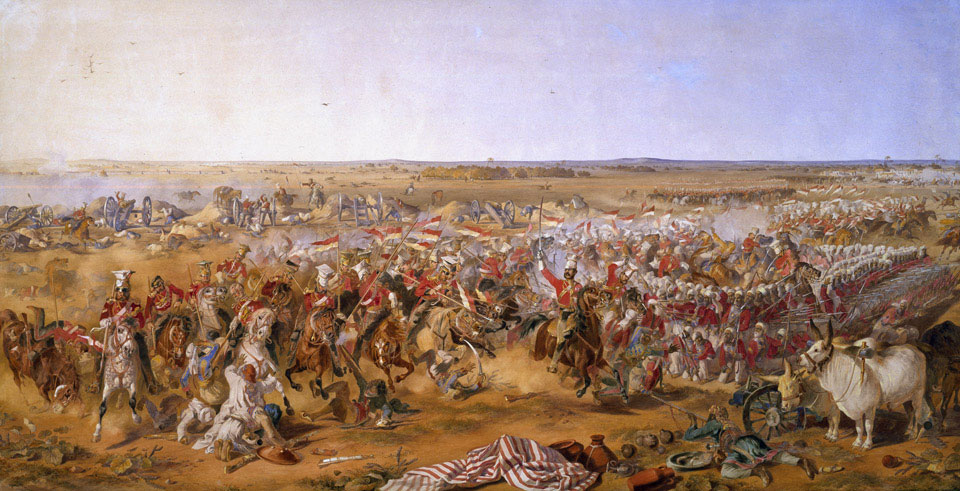
Cureton's 16th Lancers charge at the Battle of Aliwal

Cureton also fought at the Battle of Ghazni in July 1839 during the First Anglo-Afghan War and took part in the Gwalior campaign in December 1843. He commanded the cavalry at the Battle of Aliwal in January 1846 and the Battle of Sobraon in February 1846 during the First Anglo-Sikh War.

He became Adjutant-General in India from April 1846 and commanded the cavalry division at the Battle of Ramnagar where he was killed in November 1848 during the Second Anglo-Sikh War.

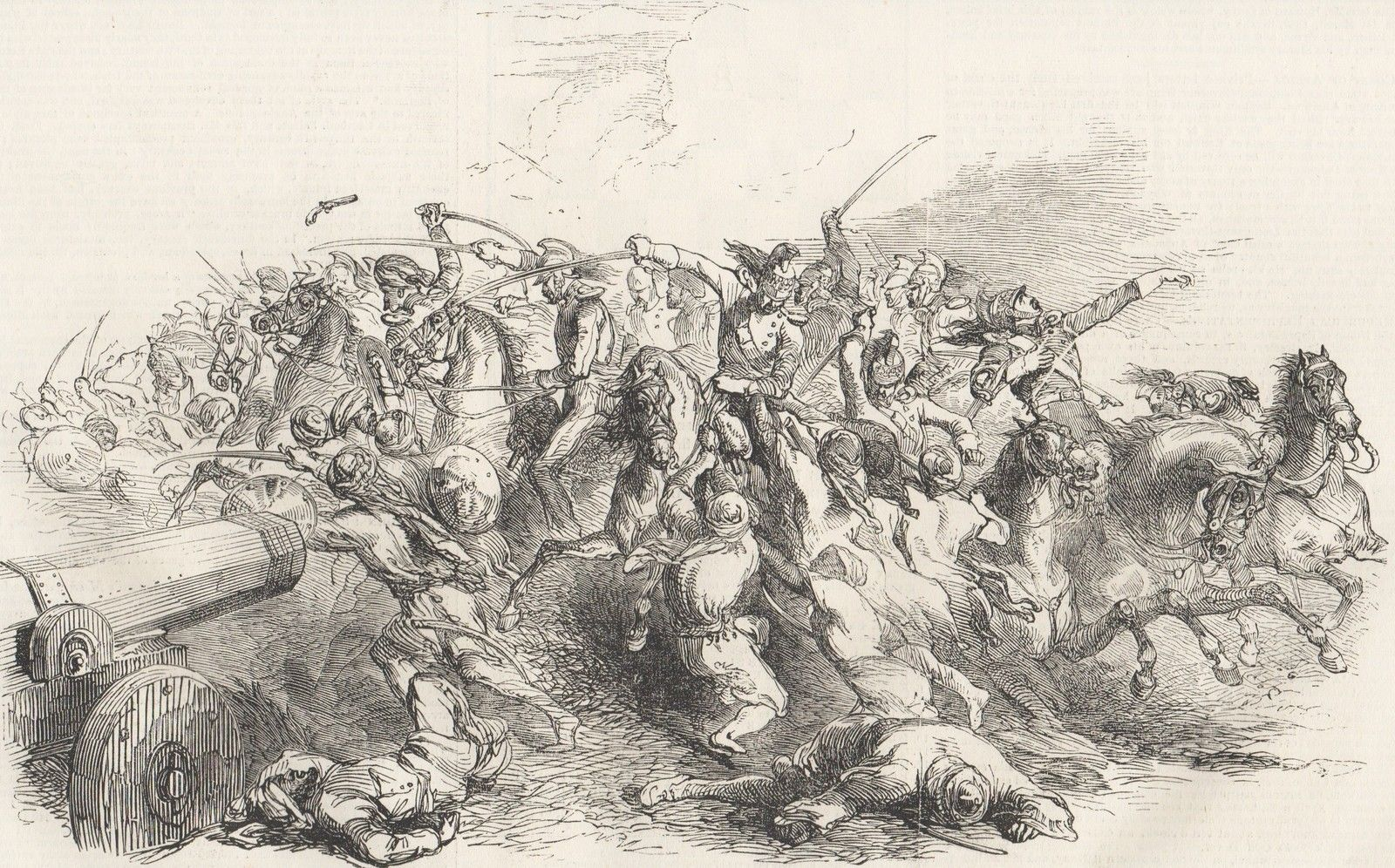
Cureton is killed at the Battle of Ramnagar

There is a life-size memorial to him in St Mary's Church, Shrewsbury, he lying in uniform, wearing his medals, by Richard Westmacott junior.

== Private life ==
Two of his sons were General Sir Charles Cureton and Lieutenant General Edward Burgoyne Cureton.

== Sources ==
- Vetch, Robert Hamilton (1901). "Cureton, Charles Robert" . In Lee, Sidney (ed.). Dictionary of National Biography (1st supplement). London: Smith, Elder & Co.

Military offices
Preceded by Sir Harry Smith	Adjutant-General, India; 1846–1848	Succeeded by Armine Mountain
