= Carmarthenshire Fortress Royal Engineers =

British military unit in Wales

Carmarthenshire Fortress Royal Engineers 484th (Carmarthenshire) Searchlight Battery, Royal Artillery 858th Movement Light Battery (Carmarthenshire Fortress), Royal Artillery
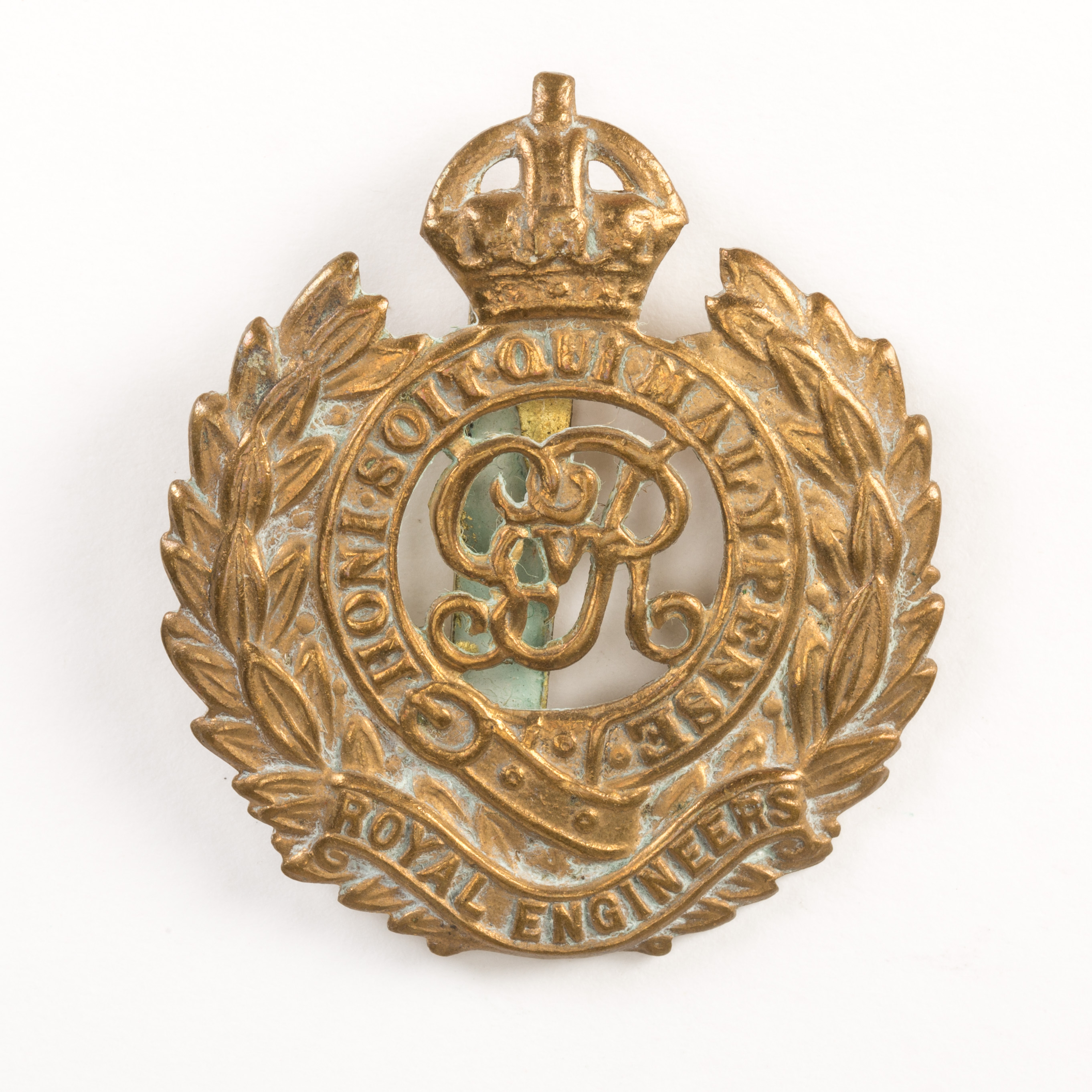
- RE Cap badge (King George V cipher)
- Active: 1920–1956
- Country: United Kingdom
- Branch: Territorial Army
- Role: Coast Defence; Air Defence
- Size: 2 Companies: 1 EL&W, 1 AA S/L
- Part of: 45 AA Brigade; Malta Command
- Garrison/HQ: Llanelli
- Engagements: The Blitz; Siege of Malta

The Carmarthenshire Fortress Royal Engineers (CFRE) was a coast defence unit of Britain's Territorial Army formed after World War I. In World War II, it provided an anti-aircraft searchlight unit that served during the early part of The Blitz, and then during the Siege of Malta.

== Origin ==
When the Territorial Army (TA) was reformed in 1920, the Carmarthen Fortress Engineers was formed as a new unit of the Royal Engineers (RE), with headquarters at Llanelli, Carmarthenshire, in South Wales. At first, it comprised a single company with a drill hall at 7 Hall Street, but by 1930 it had joined other local TA units at the Drill Hall in Murray Street. By 1935 it had expanded to two companies with the following organisation:

- HQ at Llanelli
- No 1 (Electric Light & Works) Company at The Barracks, Carmarthen
- No 2 (Anti-Aircraft Searchlight) Company at Llanelli

No 2 (AASL) Company gained a number of its recruits from the mining village of Trimsaran and the Kidwelly area. In 1935, HM Treasury approved expenditure on a new drill hall at Trimsaran for the company to share with a detachment of 4th Battalion Welch Regiment.

== Mobilisation ==
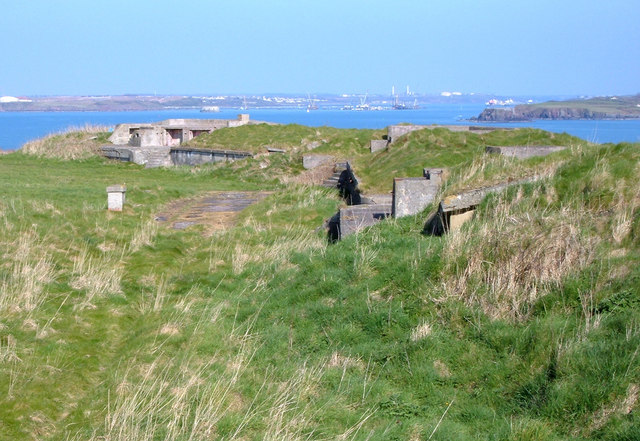
World War II AA and S/L battery positions at West Blockhouse Point.

By the outbreak of World War II, No 1 (EL&W) Co formed part of Fixed Defences (the coastal defence force) while No 2 (AASL) Co was in Anti-Aircraft Command. Both organisations were mobilised on 24 August 1939. No 1 Co went to the East and West Blockhouses at Angle, Pembrokeshire, overlooking the anchorage at Milford Haven. Here, it came under the command of Captain C.G. Glass, TD, a reserve TA officer. No 2 AASL Co, forming part of 45 AA Brigade in 4 AA Division (5 AA Division from 1 May 1940), took up its searchlight (S/L) positions at Bonvilston, near Cowbridge, and then established Company HQ at Coed Parc, Bridgend. Thus both companies were on their war stations when war was declared on 3 September.

=== No 1 (EL&W) Company ===
On 5 September, No 1 (EL&W) Co transferred a party of specialists to reinforce the Lancashire Fortress Royal Engineers at Walney Fort at Barrow-in-Furness. At the beginning of 1940, it received a draft of men from 53rd (Welsh) Division RE to bring it back up to strength. The company settled into a routine of installing and operating electrical machinery at the twin forts as part of the fixed defences. (Note: The preserved war diary of No 1 (EL&W) Co ends in April 1940 after Captain Glass left the company, and its subsequent history is obscure. It is probable that in common with other Fortress RE units (for example, the Lancashire or the Kent Fortress Royal Engineers) it was converted into or contributed personnel to one or more field or works units of the RE.)

=== No 2 (AASL) Company ===
90 cm Projector Anti-Aircraft, displayed at Fort Nelson, Portsmouth

On 1 January 1940, Brevet Major C.L. Prichard, the Commanding Officer of CFRE, took direct command of No 2 (AASL) Co at Bridgend. In May–June 1940, the company became 484 (Carmarthenshire) Searchlight Company, RE, and then on 1 August all RE S/L units in Anti-Aircraft Command were transferred to the Royal Artillery (RA), when the unit became 484 (Carmarthenshire) Searchlight Battery, RA.

== The Blitz ==
After a few probing raids in late June 1940, the number of Luftwaffe raids directed against South Wales increased so that they occurred almost nightly, the beginning of the Cardiff Blitz and Swansea Blitz. On 7 July, 484 S/L Bty was ordered to Swansea, as the first instalment of a Gun Defence Area (GDA) for the town, known as 437 S/L Area. The company set up HQ at Danycoed, 182 Mumbles Road, and deployed 12 (later 15) S/Ls, the detachments being housed in tents.

The arrival in September of 1st S/L Rgt, which had been re-equipped since its evacuation from Dunkirk, allowed 45 AA Bde to complete the illuminated areas of South Wales. 1st S/L Bty of 1st S/L Rgt relieved 484 S/L Bty, which was intended to move to another site in the brigade's area, but AA Command decided instead to enlarge the illuminated area round the important naval base at Devonport, which was already subject to air attack. On 28/29 September, 484 S/L Bty was moved to Plymouth, with BHQ at Bull Point Barracks, Devonport, where it came under 55th Light AA Bde.

== Siege of Malta ==
However, the battery did not stay long in Plymouth, because it was rostered for overseas service. By November 1940, it was at a mobilisation centre at Southend-on-Sea awaiting embarkation. While at Southend, the battery was attached to 69th (Royal Warwickshire Regiment) Heavy AA (HAA) Regiment. It then sailed together with 190/69 and 191/69 HAA Btys to Malta, arriving via Egypt on 8 January 1941 with a strength of nine officers and 322 other ranks. Malta had been under air attack since the day Italy entered the war (11 June 1940) and urgently needed AA reinforcements. In January, the German Luftwaffe joined the Regia Aeronautica in attacks on the island.

Once at Malta, 484 (Carmarthenshire) S/L Bty with its 24 S/L projectors joined 4th Searchlight Regiment, Royal Artillery/Royal Malta Artillery, which had been formed the previous month. The other batteries in this composite regiment were 16 Fortress Company, RE (which had retained its searchlight responsibilities, unlike the companies in the UK), and the newly-formed 8 S/L Bty, Royal Malta Artillery (RMA).

With the arrival of the reinforcements, the AA defences on Malta were divided into two formations, 7 AA Bde covering the south half of the island while 10 AA Bde took the north. This arrangement was found not to work, and soon 7 AA Bde took over all the LAA and S/L defences, including 4th S/L Rgt RA/RMA, and 10 AA Bde commanded the HAA guns.

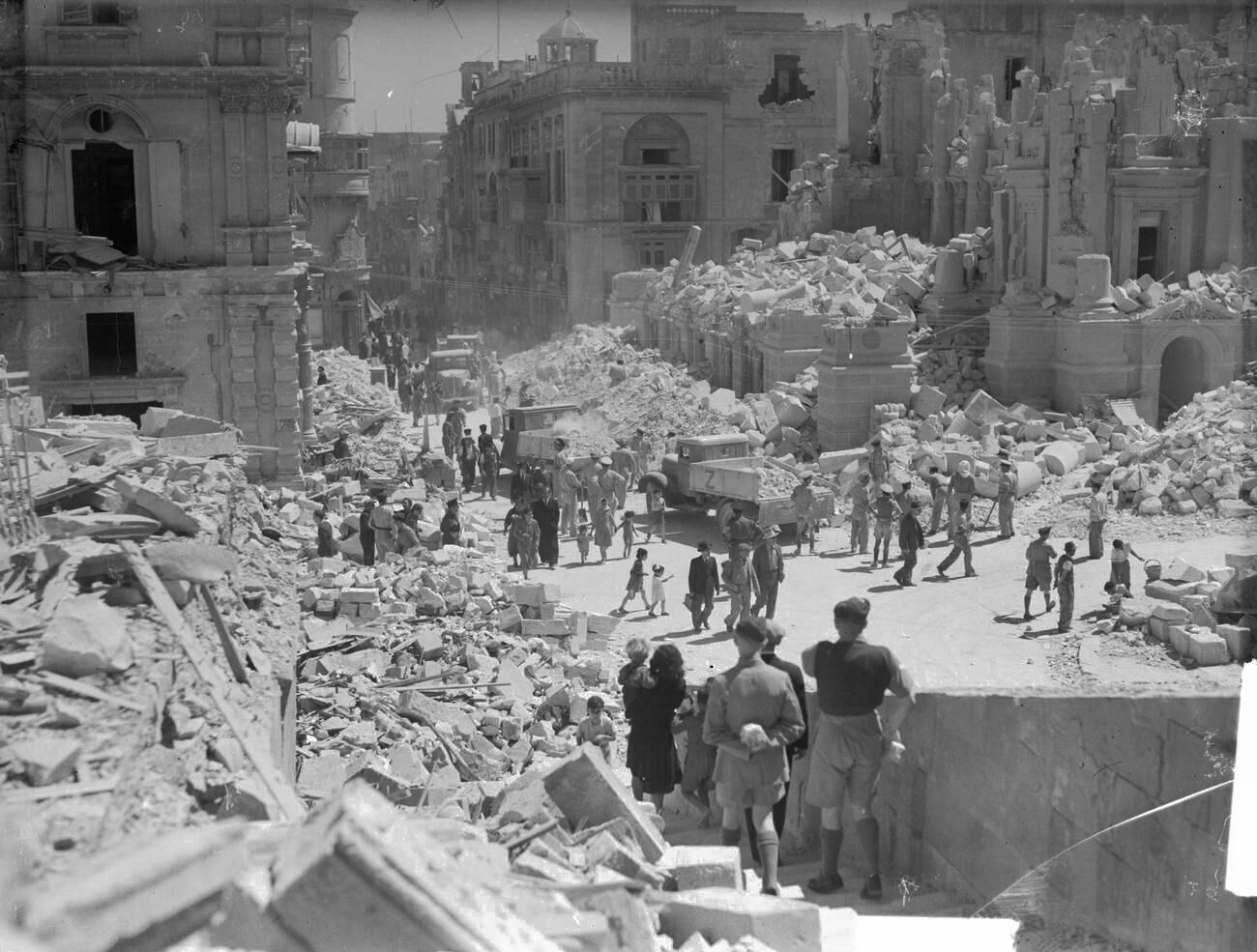
Service personnel and civilians clear up debris on a heavily bomb-damaged street in Valletta, Malta, on 1 May 1942.

In February, the Luftwaffe 's Fliegerkorps X was ordered to neutralise Malta, and it began a series of heavy bombing raids, mainly at night, accompanied by mine-dropping in and around the harbour. In the following months the Luftwaffe attacked by night and day, and the defences took a steady toll of its strength. By the beginning of June the depleted Fliegerkorps X handed responsibility back to the Italians.

Malta was largely left alone during the summer of 1941, but attacks resumed in November after Fliegerkorps II arrived in Sicily. Air raids were increasingly common during November and December, and rations and supplies began to run short. 484 S/L Battery HQ at Naxxar was hit with the loss of three killed and two wounded. Increasingly, the Luftwaffe turned to Flak suppression, attacking the AA positions themselves with bombs and machine guns, and several S/L sites were hit.

Almost continuous attacks went on through early 1942, particularly aimed at airfields, shipping and port installations. Heavy raids were made by the Luftwaffe in daylight while smaller harassing raids were made by the Regia Aeronautica. By this stage of the siege, night bombers could be engaged by the HAA guns using visual height control at targets illuminated by S/L or by the GL Mark II gun-laying radar, or with predicted barrage fire. The S/L layout was at 3,000 yards (2,700 m) spacing and with the clear air of Malta 23 per cent of raids were illuminated at heights of up to 23,000 feet (7,000 m). The lights were controlled by a searchlight controller in the RAF Fighter Operations Room. Until December 1941, when Junkers Ju 88s began night operations, RAF Hawker Hurricanes were able to destroy 40 per cent of Italian-manned aircraft that had been illuminated. By June, the size of night raids had grown to 90+ aircraft, while day raids were as few as eight aircraft. These raids were targeted at RAF airfields, but the raiders lost heavily and the scale of attacks dwindled in July. In the first week in August only seven bombers approached the island, the lowest number for several months. However, the vital supply convoys came under heavy attack and suffered serious losses of ships and cargoes. However, the survivors of the 'Pedestal' convoy fought their way through the island between 13 and 15 August with just sufficient supplies to prolong the defence until December.

By October, the Luftwaffe had reinforced Fliegerkorps II, and a new round of heavy raids against the island began in an effort to restrict the RAF and Royal Navy's ability to interdict Axis convoys to Libya. The raiders employed new low-level tactics that lost heavily to the AA guns and RAF fighters. Night raids were mainly made by a succession of single aircraft at high level. However, the S/L crews were now much more proficient, achieving 37 per cent illuminations of aircraft crossing the coast, and these were heavily engaged. At last, a supply convoy got through in November. With the recent Axis defeat at Alamein and the Allied North Africa landings the same month, the siege of Malta was ended. The only enemy air activity for the rest of the year was occasional high-flying reconnaissances and one raid on Luqa in December.

In May 1943, Axis aircraft reappeared in an attempt to disrupt preparations for the Allied invasion of Sicily (Operation Husky), but these raids caused little damage. After the Surrender of Italy on 8 September 1943 the defences of Malta began to be scaled back. Towards the end of the year, 484 S/L Bty was sent to Egypt to join Middle East Forces (MEF). Shortly after the battery left, 4 S/L Rgt RA/RMA was disbanded.

== Middle East ==
484 (Carmarthenshire) S/L Bty began arriving at Alexandria on 1 January 1944, and on 17 January was attached to 27th (London Electrical Engineers) S/L Rgt. It had brought its own equipment, but took over 90 cm S/L positions from 304/27 S/L Bty and became operational along the Suez Canal on 24 February with Battery HQ at Ismailia under 78 AA Bde while 304 Bty was deployed to Tobruk. But there was little to do apart from training with the new Searchlight Control (SLC) radar. In May, 304 Bty returned to Ismailia and 484 Bty went a short way to Quassassin where it came under 21 AA Bde.

The air threat to the Middle East bases had diminished by now, and the need to provide manpower for other tasks took priority. By June 1944, the AA defences under MEF had been reduced to a 'shell' to protect Alexandria and the Suez Canal. In July, the regiment was disposed as follows:

- RHQ, 306 and 484 Btys under 17 AA Bde in the Suez Canal area
- 390 Bty under 1 AA Bde covering the Levant and Cyprus

The following month, 484 Bty began to disband (which was completed during August; officially it entered 'suspended animation' on 10 September) and most of its personnel were sent to No 2 Depot Regiment, RA, for drafting to other units.

== Postwar ==
When the TA was reconstituted in 1947, it was at first proposed to reform the battery as a gun tractor battery, but that role was taken over by the Royal Army Service Corps, and instead 484 S/L Bty was reconstituted as 858th Movement Light Battery (Carmarthenshire Fortress), RA with HQ at Llanelli.

With the advances in radar technology, AA S/L units were under-employed by the end of World War II, but during the campaign in North West Europe 21st Army Group had pioneered the technique of reflecting light off the cloudbase to provide 'artificial moonlight' or 'movement light' (also known as 'Monty's moonlight' after 21st Army Group's commander, General Sir Bernard Montgomery) in support of night operations. This role was taken up by a number of independent S/L batteries (Moonlight Batteries) in the postwar era.

On 31 October 1956, the battery was converted back to RE and amalgamated into 108 Field Engineer Regiment, RE (formerly 53rd (Welsh) Division RE). This regiment was later absorbed into the Royal Monmouthshire Royal Engineers.

== Honorary Colonel ==
Brevet Lieutenant-Colonel A.L. Holland, MC, was appointed Honorary Colonel of the Carmarthenshire Fortress Engineers on 5 January 1938.

== Memorials ==
There is a memorial to the Royal Engineers of Carmarthenshire in World War II at the Guildhall in Carmarthen.

A number of members of 484 S/L Bty, mostly born in Llanelli, are buried at Pietà Military Cemetery and at Pembroke Military Cemetery on Malta.
