= 6RTR =

6RTR may refer to:

- The 6th Royal Tank Regiment of the British Army
- 6RTR, a radio station in Perth, Western Australia
