= 4th Searchlight Regiment, Royal Artillery/Royal Malta Artillery =

- Royal Artillery cap badge
- Active: 25 November 1940–March 1944
- Country: United Kingdom
- Branch: British Army
- Type: Searchlight Regiment
- Role: Air Defence
- Size: 3 Batteries
- Part of: Malta Command
- Engagements: Siege of Malta

The 4th Searchlight Regiment, Royal Artillery/Royal Malta Artillery was a composite unit of the Royal Artillery (RA) and Royal Malta Artillery (RMA) formed on Malta during the Siege of the island in World War II. As well as RA and RMA subunits, it also included a contingent of searchlight (S/L) operators from the Royal Engineers (RE), and was initially commanded by an RE officer.

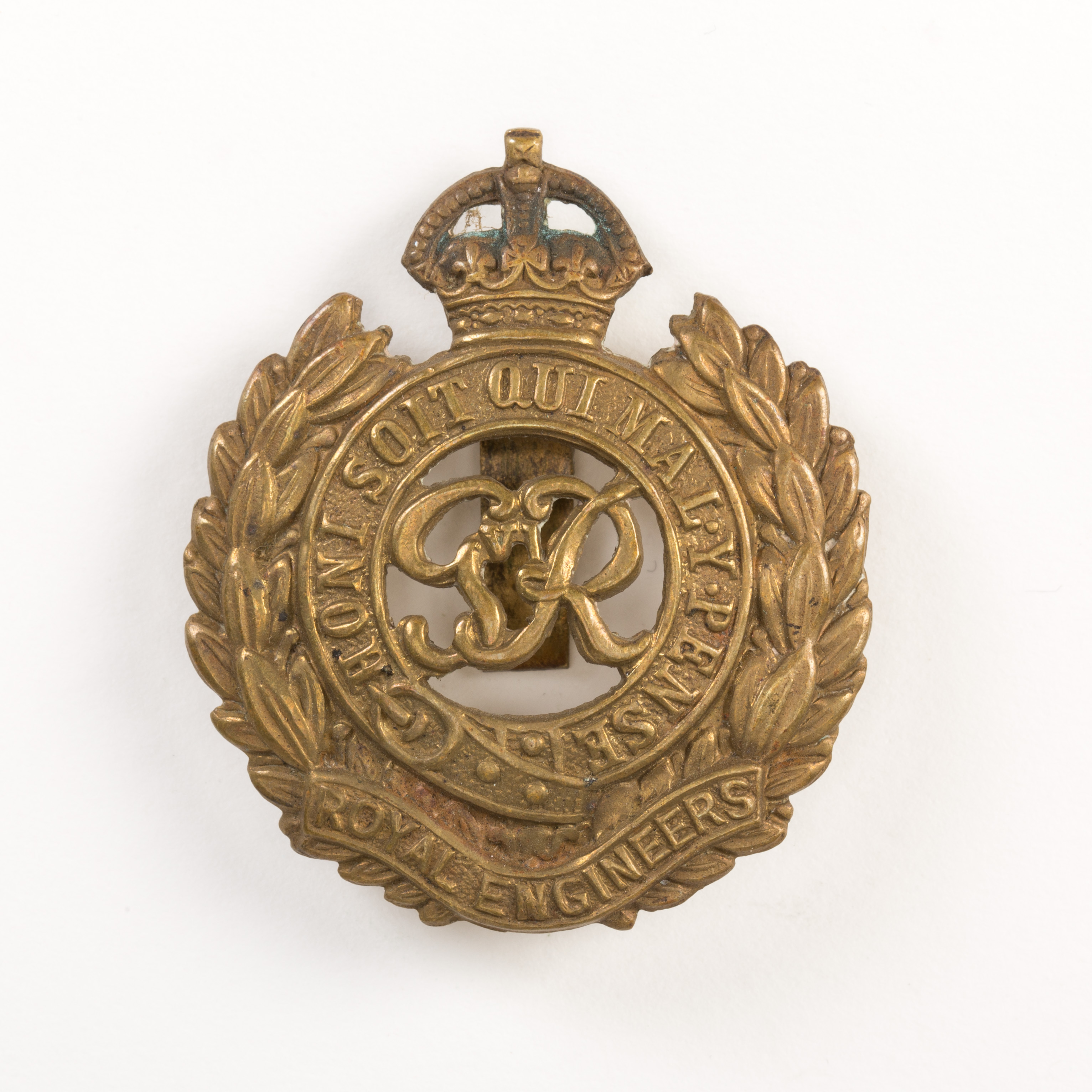
The Royal Engineers' cap badge, worn by 16th Fortress Company.

== Origin ==
Malta was a major naval base, being Britain's only port in the central Mediterranean on the crucial route between Gibraltar and Alexandria. During World War II it was also a forward base for the Royal Navy (RN) and the Royal Air Force (RAF) to launch attacks against the Axis powers. However, it was clearly at risk from air raids launched from Sicily and mainland Italy, and careful consideration had been given by the Committee of Imperial Defence to the island's AA defences. The scale approved included 24 searchlights (S/Ls), which – unlike the AA guns – were all in place when Italy under Mussolini declared war on the Allies on 10 June 1940. These lights were manned by 16th Fortress Company, Royal Engineers (RE). This had been reformed in September 1934 as an AAS/L unit, though its remit had been broadened and it was redesignated as a Fortress Company the following year. The other RE company on the island, 24th Fortress Co, manned the coast defence (CD) searchlights.

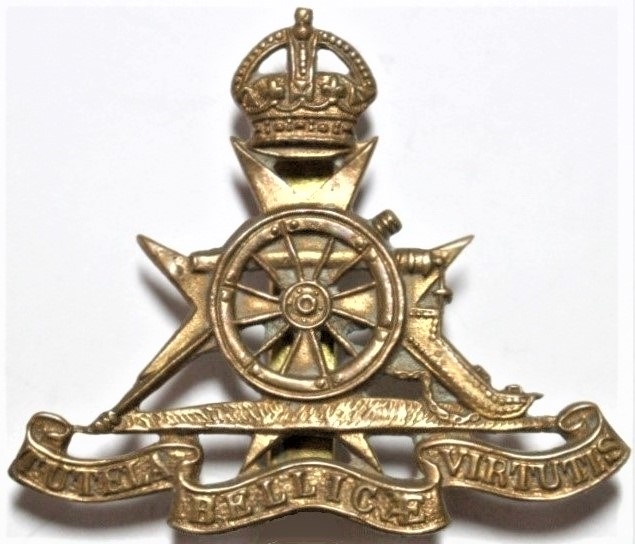
The Royal Malta Artillery cap badge.

On 15 January 1940 a cadre from 16th Fortress Co helped to establish 8th Searchlight Battery of the Royal Malta Artillery (RMA). This was initially regimented with 2nd AA Regiment, RMA. Once Italy entered the war Malta came under immediate air attack and urgently needed AA reinforcements. These were despatched from the UK and Gibraltar in November, and in anticipation of their arrival a new composite 4th Searchlight Regiment, Royal Artillery/Royal Malta Artillery was created on the island on 25 November, initially controlling 16th Fortress Co and 8th S/L Bty. The officer commanding 16th Fortress Co, Major J.E.T. Nicholson, was promoted to Lieutenant-Colonel to be the new regiment's commanding officer (CO). The S/L reinforcements comprised 484th (Carmarthenshire) S/L Bty, RA, which had been converted from No 2 AAS/L Company of the Carmarthenshire Fortress Royal Engineers earlier in the year. It sailed in November in a convoy that also included two heavy AA (HAA) batteries and arrived (via Egypt) on 8 January 1941 with a strength of nine officers, 322 other ranks and 24 S/L projectors, bringing to total to 64. Initially the S/L crews only had obsolete sound-locators, with no radar.

== Siege of Malta ==
Italy declared war on Britain on 10 June 1940 and the Regia Aeronautica began attacks on the island next day. The few fighter aircraft and the inexperienced AA gunners battled the summer raids, which were not particularly effective. There was then a lull in the autumn while both sides awaited reinforcements.

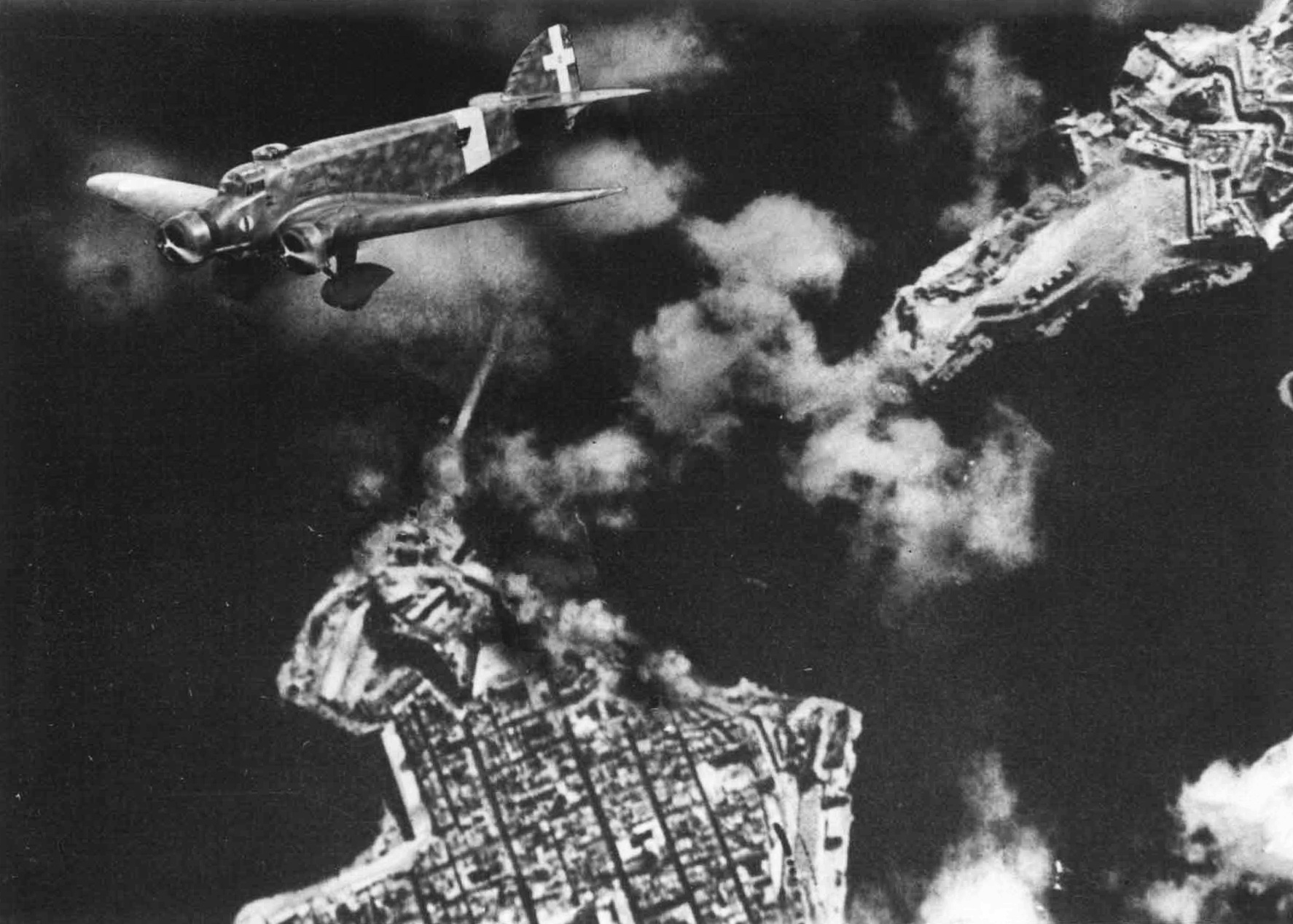
Italian aircraft bombing Grand Harbour

With the arrival of the British reinforcements, the AA defences on Malta were divided into two formations, 7 AA Bde covering the south half of the island while 10 AA Bde took the north. This arrangement was found not to work, and soon 7 AA Bde took over all the LAA and S/L defences, including 4th S/L Rgt RA/RMA, while 10 AA Bde commanded the HAA guns.

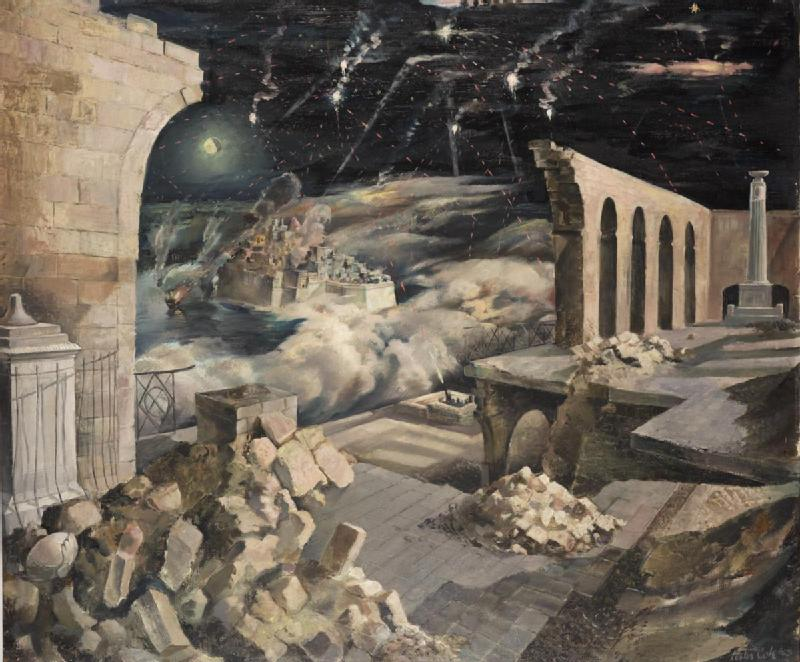
Malta – the Harbour Barrage from the Upper Barracca, by Leslie Cole; depicting an AA gun (in the centre of the composition) firing during a night air raid.

=== 1941 ===
In January, the German Luftwaffe joined the Regia Aeronautica, initially undertaking high-level reconnaissance. In February, the Luftwaffe 's Fliegerkorps X was ordered to neutralise Malta, and it began a series of heavy bombing raids, mainly at night, accompanied by mine-dropping in and around the harbour. In the following months the Luftwaffe attacked by night and day, and the defences took a steady toll of its strength. By the beginning of June the depleted Fliegerkorps X handed responsibility back to the Italians.

Malta was largely left alone during the summer of 1941, but attacks resumed in November after Fliegerkorps II arrived in Sicily. Air raids were increasingly common during November and December, and rations and supplies began to run short. 484 S/L Battery HQ at Naxxar was hit with the loss of three killed and two wounded. Increasingly, the Luftwaffe turned to Flak suppression, attacking the AA positions themselves with bombs and machine guns, and several S/L sites were hit.

=== 1942 ===
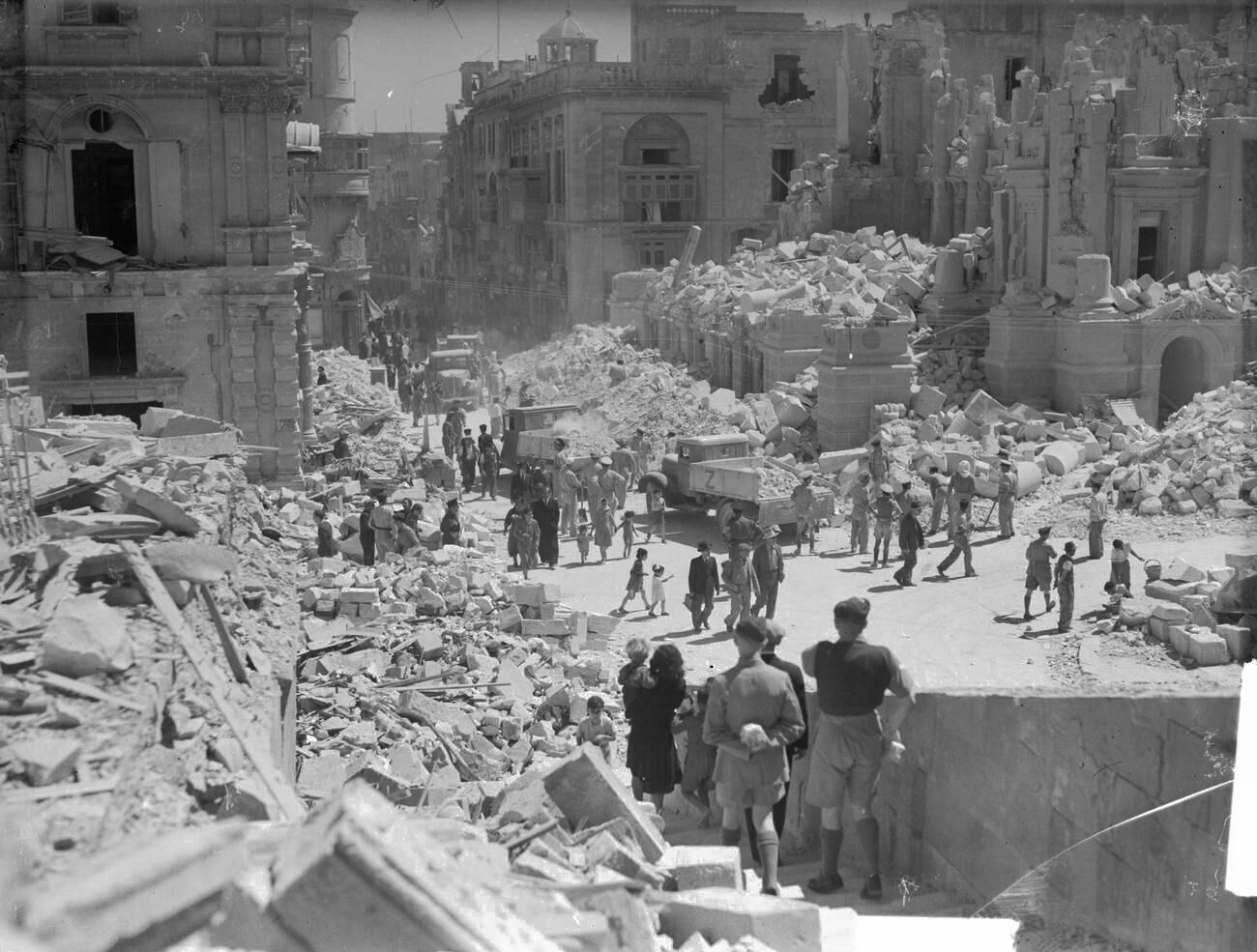
Service personnel and civilians clear up debris on a heavily bomb-damaged street in Valletta, Malta, on 1 May 1942.

Almost continuous attacks went on through early 1942, particularly aimed at airfields, shipping and port installations. Heavy raids were made by the Luftwaffe in daylight while smaller harassing raids were made by the Regia Aeronautica. By this stage of the siege, night bombers could be engaged by the HAA guns using visual height control at targets illuminated by S/L or by the GL Mark II gun-laying radar, or with predicted barrage fire. The S/L layout was at 3,000 yards (2,700 m) spacing and with the clear air of Malta 23 per cent of raids were illuminated at heights of up to 23,000 feet (7,000 m). During the early part of 1942 the S/L density was thickened up in the north and east of the island to ensure early pick-up and efficient holding of the raiders as they flew in. The lights were controlled by a searchlight controller in the RAF Fighter Operations Room. Until December 1941, when Junkers Ju 88s began night operations, RAF Hawker Hurricanes were able to destroy 40 per cent of Italian-manned aircraft that had been illuminated. By June, the size of night raids had grown to 90+ aircraft, while day raids were as few as eight aircraft. These raids were targeted at RAF airfields, but the raiders lost heavily and the scale of attacks dwindled in July. On 4 July a Ju 88 was engaged by B Trp of 4th S/L Rgt and crashed while taking avoiding action: it was awarded to the regiment as a 'kill'. The regiment was commended for its smart S/L work against a raid on the night of 20/21 July, when three raiders were destroyed. Lieutenant-Colonel A.F.B. Powell had been CO of 4th S/L Rgt since 20 April 1942. On 28 July he handed over command of 4th S/L Rgt to Lt-Col W.A.N. Hammond.

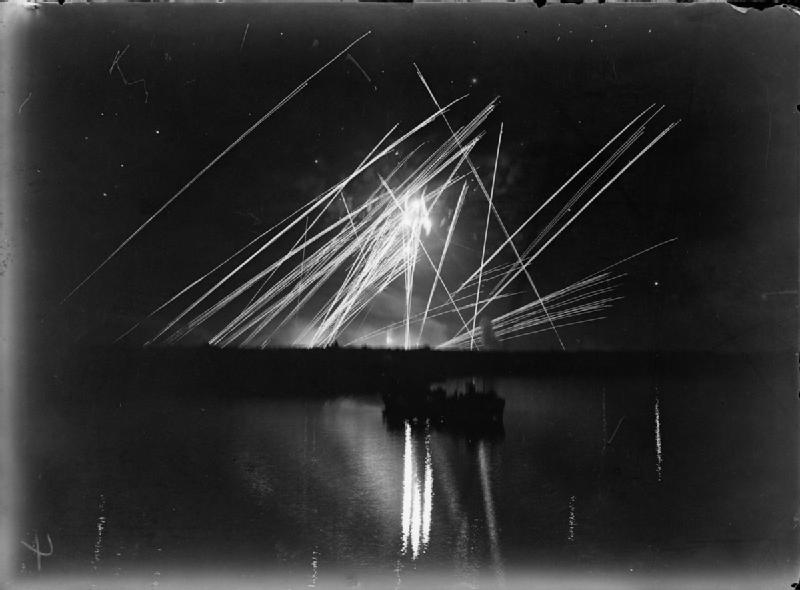
Tracer fire and shellbursts over Grand Harbour during a night air raid.

In the first week of August only seven bombers approached the island, the lowest number for several months. However, the vital supply convoys came under heavy attack and suffered serious losses of ships and cargoes. However, the survivors of the 'Pedestal' convoy fought their way through the island between 13 and 15 August with just sufficient supplies to prolong the defence until December. The regiment received a few 150 cm S/Ls equipped with searchlight control (SLC or 'Elsie') radar and experimented with integrating them into its procedures. It also operated a regimental training school to train local recruits and during the summer was able to rotate some of the Troops for periods of rest and training, as well as opening a few more S/L sites. By the end of August the regiment had a strength of 32 officers and 1115 other ranks. On 23 August during a daylight raid Sapper Stott brought down a Messerschmitt Bf 109 with Light machine gun fire.

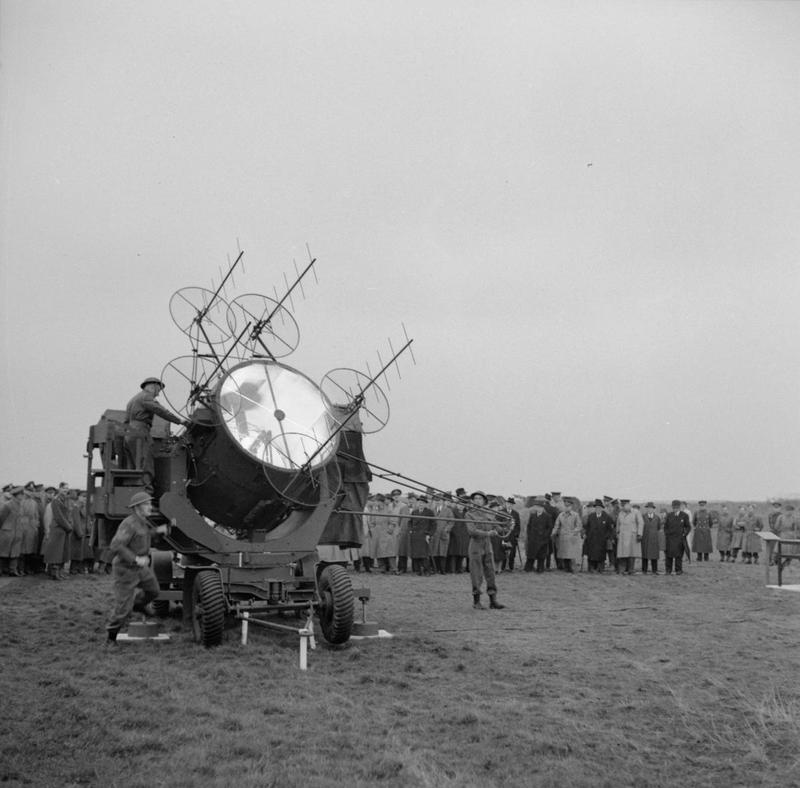
A 150 cm searchlight equipped with No 2 Mk VI SLC ('Elsie').

By October, the Luftwaffe had reinforced Fliegerkorps II, and a new round of heavy raids against the island began in an effort to restrict the RAF and Royal Navy's ability to interdict Axis convoys to Libya. The raiders employed new low-level tactics that lost heavily to the AA guns and RAF fighters. Night raids were mainly made by a succession of single aircraft at high level. However, the S/L crews were now much more proficient, achieving 37 per cent illuminations of aircraft crossing the coast, and these were heavily engaged. At last, a supply convoy got through in November. With the recent Axis defeat at Alamein and the Allied North Africa landings the same month, the siege of Malta was ended. The only enemy air activity for the rest of the year was occasional high-flying reconnaissances and one raid on Luqa in December.

=== 1943 ===
The regiment reported no S/L engagements at all in January, February and March 1943, but continued to improve its SLC capabilities, training detachments from the RMA battery to use it. In May 1943, Axis aircraft reappeared in an attempt to disrupt preparations for the Allied invasion of Sicily (Operation Husky), but these raids caused little damage. The regiment continued to strengthen the S/L and SLC cover for the north of the island where invasion shipping was gathering. It finally gave up its old sound locators in August.

== Disbandment ==
After the Surrender of Italy on 8 September 1943 the defences of Malta began to be scaled back. 16th Fortress Co returned on 28 November 1943 to the UK where it became 16th Electrical and Mechanical Company, RE. It later served in the campaign in North West Europe and then in India and the Far East at the end of the war. On 1 January 1944, 8 S/L Bty RMA became an independent battery directly under 10 AA Bde; it continued to provide S/L cover for the island for the rest of the war, after which it was regimented with 2nd AA (Composite) Rgt, RMA. During January 1944, 484 S/L Bty embarked for Egypt to join Middle East Forces (MEF). It served in the Suez Canal defences until September 1944 when it was placed in suspended animation and its personnel drafted to other units. RHQ 4th S/L Regiment joined HQ RA in an advisory capacity in January 1944 and was disbanded in May 1944.
