= Malta Tanks (Royal Tank Regiment) =

Malta Tanks, Royal Tank Regiment
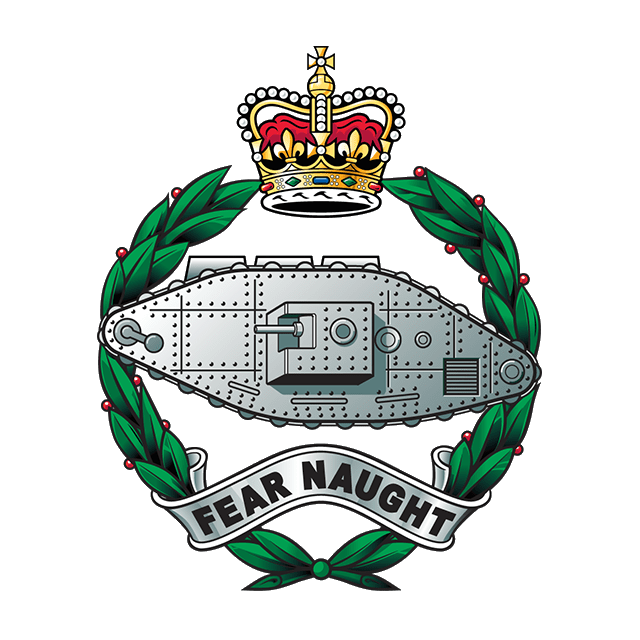
- The Cap badge of the Royal Tank Regiment.
- Active: 1940 onwards
- Branch: British Army
- Garrison/HQ: Malta

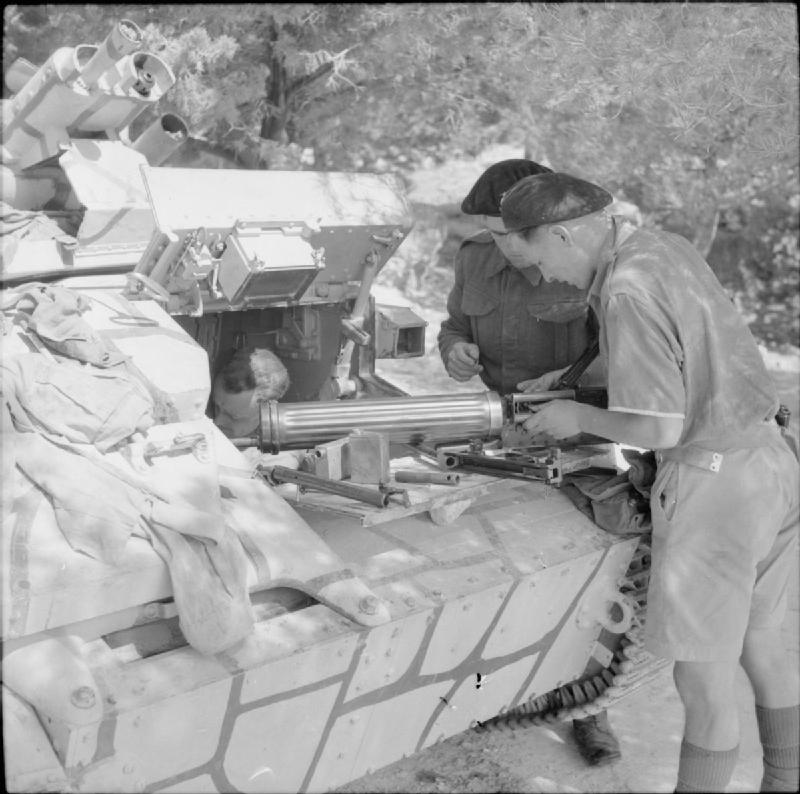
The crew of a Vickers Mk VIb Light Tank servicing one of their Vickers machine guns. The camouflage mimicking the stone walls of Malta was unique to Malta Command.

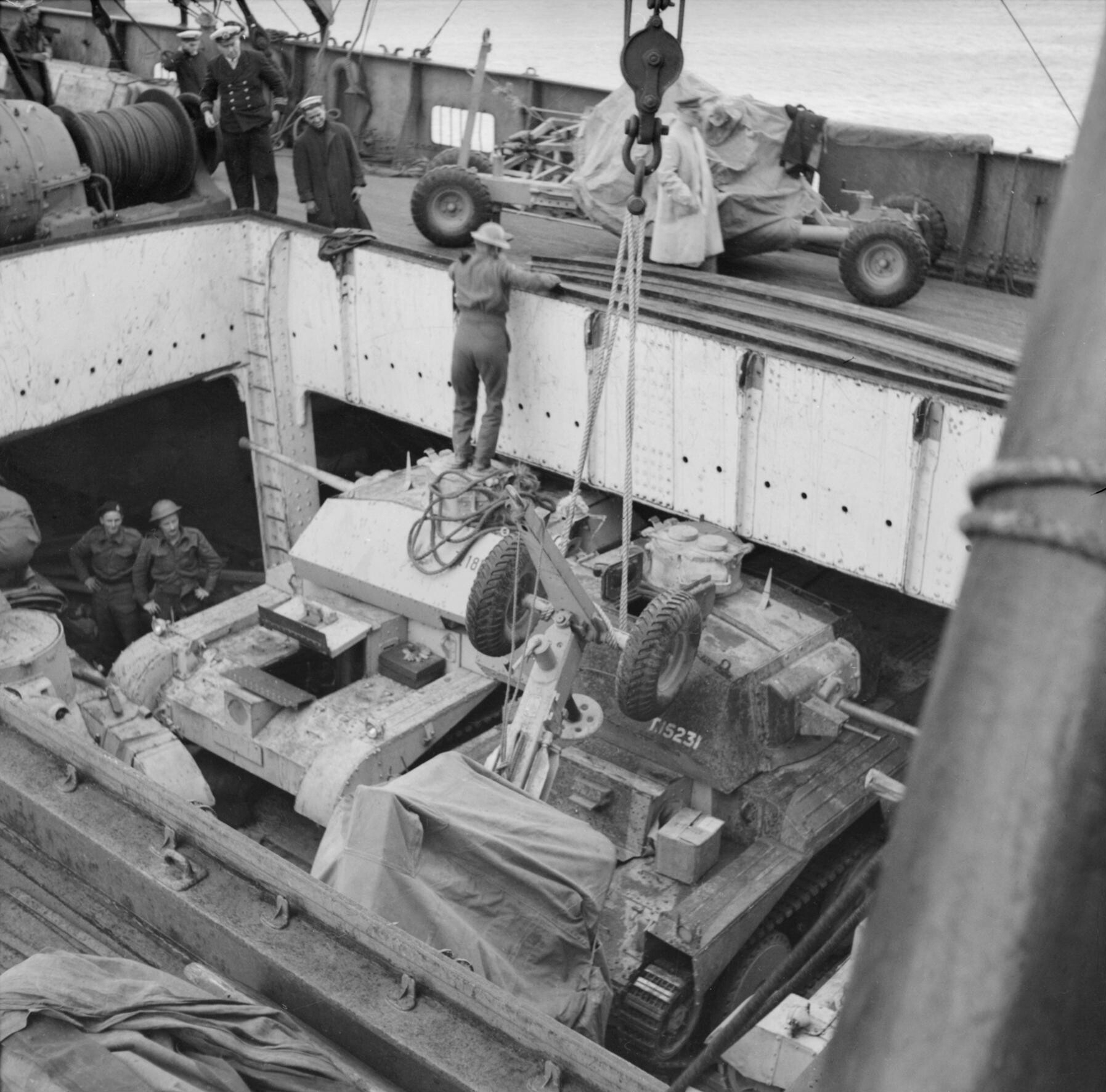
Two cruiser tanks of 6 RTR being unloaded from a convoy ship docked in Valletta in 1942.

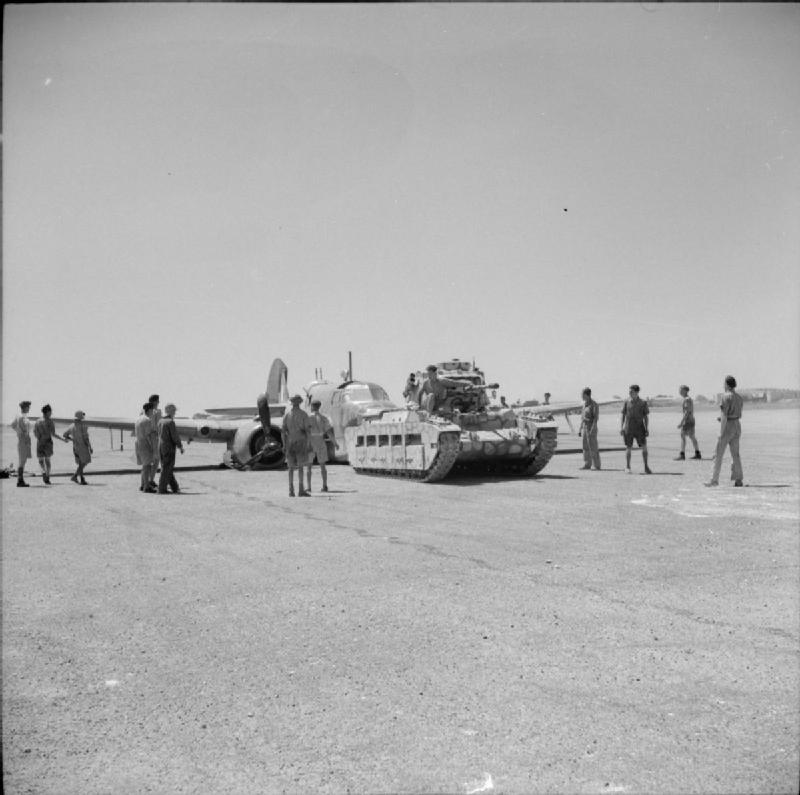
A Matilda being used to tow a Bristol Beaufort torpedo bomber which made a belly-landing at RAF Luqa, 16 July 1942.

The Malta Tanks was a unit designation for an independent Royal Tank Regiment (RTR) unit made of a mixture of British tank types deployed to Malta in World War II.

== Role and deployment ==
The first armoured unit destined for Malta was organised in 1940. The unit was formed with strength of five officers and 62 other ranks; and was attached to 44th Royal Tank Regiment prior to its embarkation for Malta; the unit was part of Malta Command.

On 28 November 1940 1 Independent Troop, 44 RTR (commanded by Captain R E H Drury) arrived on Malta on Convoy R.45. The troop's heavy equipment included:

- Four Matilda II infantry tanks (named 'Faulknor', 'Gallant', 'Greyhound' and 'Griffin')
- Two Light Tank Mk VIB
- Four motorcycles
- Four Bedford OXD 30-cwt lorries
- Two 15-cwt trucks
- One 15-cwt water bowser
- One 'Car Utility'.

In 1942 the tanks of A Squadron 6th Royal Tank Regiment (which had sailed from Alexandria) arrived on the island. By 30 June 1942 the British armour was organised thus:

- One troop of Vickers Light Tanks
- Two troops of cruiser tanks
- One troop of Matilda tanks

A Squadron 6 RTR group was made up of three officers (Major S D G Longworth, Lt K J H Macdonald and 2Lt J Stiddard and 79 other ranks.

On 21 December 1942 A Squadron, 6 Royal Tank Regiment amalgamated with the Malta Tank Troop and was reported as “Malta Tanks” with effect from this date. The whole unit remained under Central Infantry Brigade for administration. Malta Tanks was commanded by Major S D G Longworth. X Squadron had set sail with 13 A13 Cruiser tanks but five were lost when the ship carrying them struck a mine and sank. Other tanks (Valentines) also arrived in 1942.

The unit never became larger than 19 vehicles and did not see action. It spent the war patrolling, boosting morale across central Malta and acting as tugs removing damaged aircraft from runways.

== Equipment ==
Malta Tanks was equipped with five types of tank during its time on the Island.

Name	Type	Photo	Notes
Light Tank Mk VI (Marks VIb and VIc)	Reconnaissance tank		Dual turret fit of a Vickers machine gun .5in and .303 or Dual turret fit of a Besa 15mm and 7.92 mm Machine Guns. Three Deployed
Matilda II	Infantry Support Tank		40mm 2-pounder gun & 7.92 mm coaxial Besa machine gun. Four Deployed
Cruiser Mk I (Mark I or A9)	Cruiser tank		40mm 2-pounder gun & three 0.303 Vickers machine gun. At least one deployed
Cruiser Mk III	Cruiser tank		40mm 2-pounder gun, coaxial 7.92 mm Besa machine gun. Seven or less Deployed
Valentine Mark III	Infantry tank		40mm 2-pounder gun, coaxial 7.92 mm Besa machine gun. Four deployed

== See also ==
- Siege of Malta (World War II)
- Operation Herkules
- 44th Royal Tank Regiment
- 6th Royal Tank Regiment
