= Malta Command =

British military command

- Malta Command's insignia and shoulder flash.
- Founded: 1915
- Disbanded: 1977
- Service branches: Operations, Plans, Intelligence, Logistics, Communications and Medical
- Headquarters: Valletta, Malta

Personnel
- Conscription: Regular British and Maltese Army

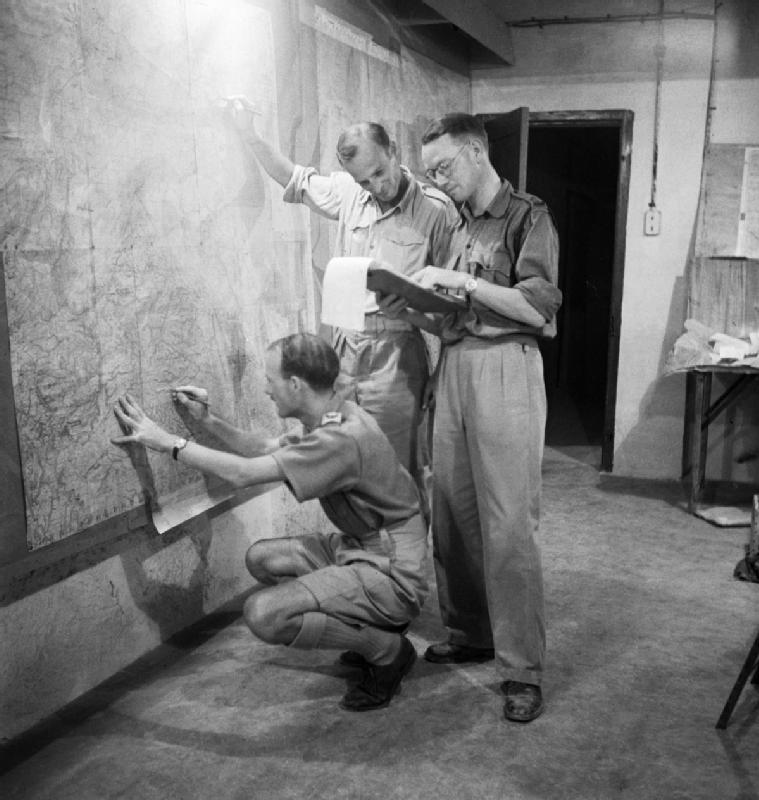
Malta Command staff officers plotting troop positions on a wall map in the Command's underground Lascaris HQ operations room.

Malta Command was an independent command of the British Army. It commanded all army units involved in the defence of Malta. Once mobilised, the Command deployed its headquarters to underground hardened shelters and its combat units were deployed to fixed points in the Maltese countryside, from where they operated. This mobilised, but largely static, army garrison would be tested by aerial bombardment and naval blockade during the Second World War. Whilst Malta Command was already a functioning command structure before 1939 (it had existed in the Great War and was specifically mentioned in a House of Commons debate of 12 February 1917), the Second World War would see the Command operate as a genuine war-fighting headquarters, albeit in a static defensive role.

On 15 April 1942, the Island of Malta was awarded the George Cross by King George VI in recognition of the stalwart defence and fortitude of service personnel and civilians against a much more powerful Axis foe. Malta, an island of only 117 square miles, had been more heavily bombed than London had been during their blitz.

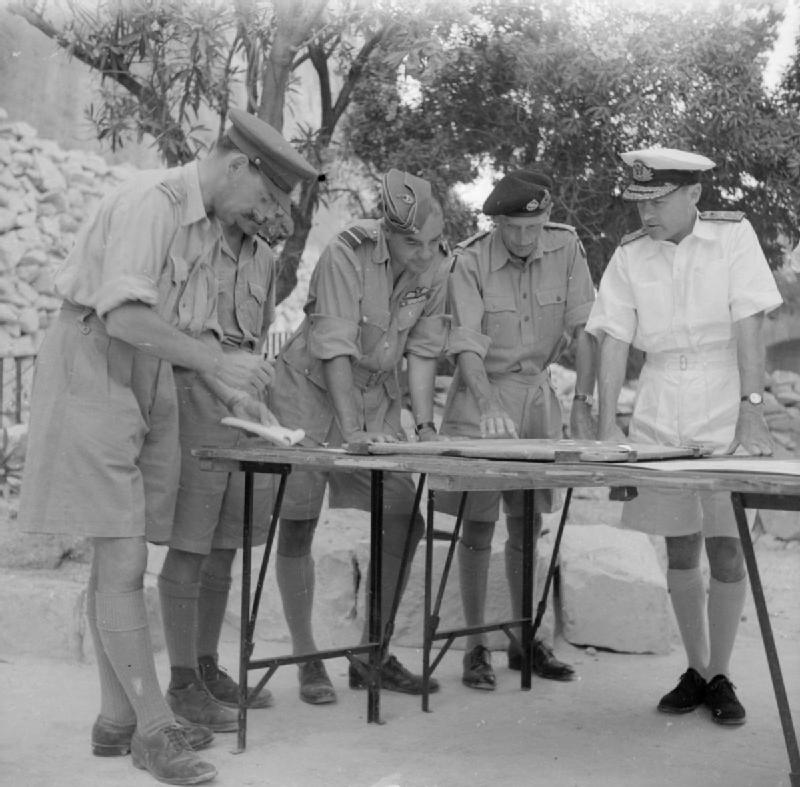
Malta Command hosted the combined British command staff as they planned the Allied assault on Sicily in 1943 (Operation Husky).

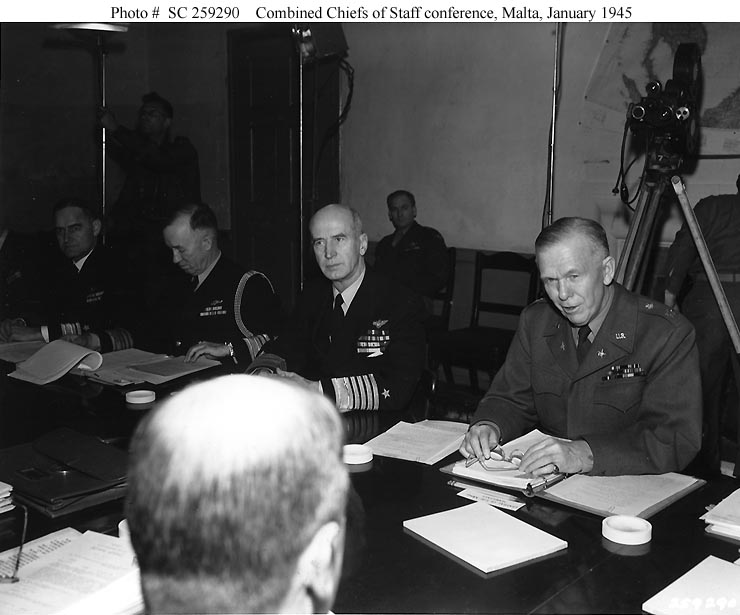
A high-level meeting involving senior US and UK staffs was hosted on Malta on 31 July 1945, General of the Army George C. Marshall is sat on the right facing the camera.

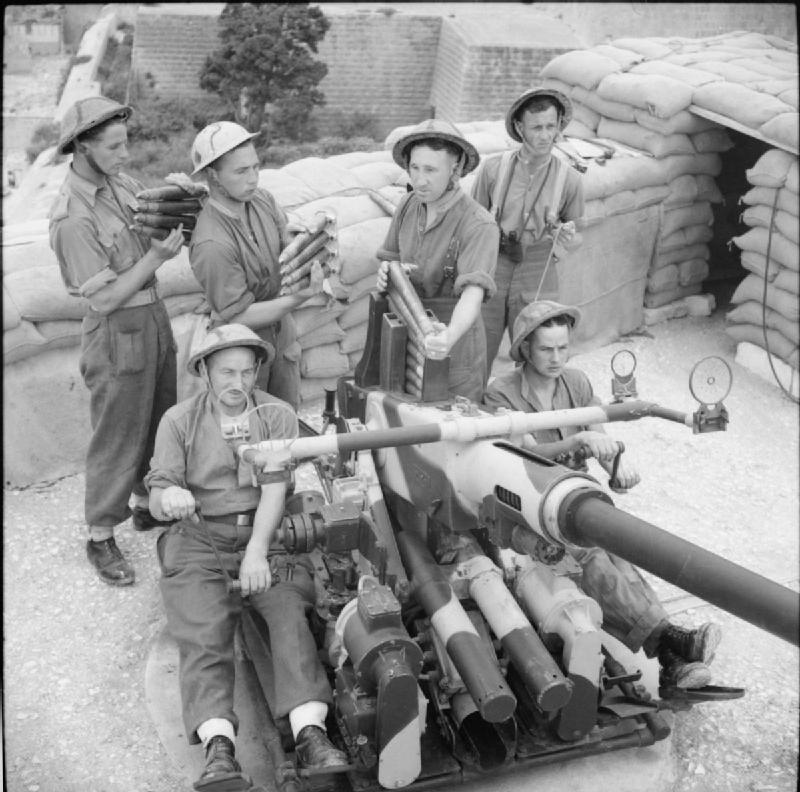
A Royal Artillery 40mm Bofors anti-aircraft gun and crew defending Malta.

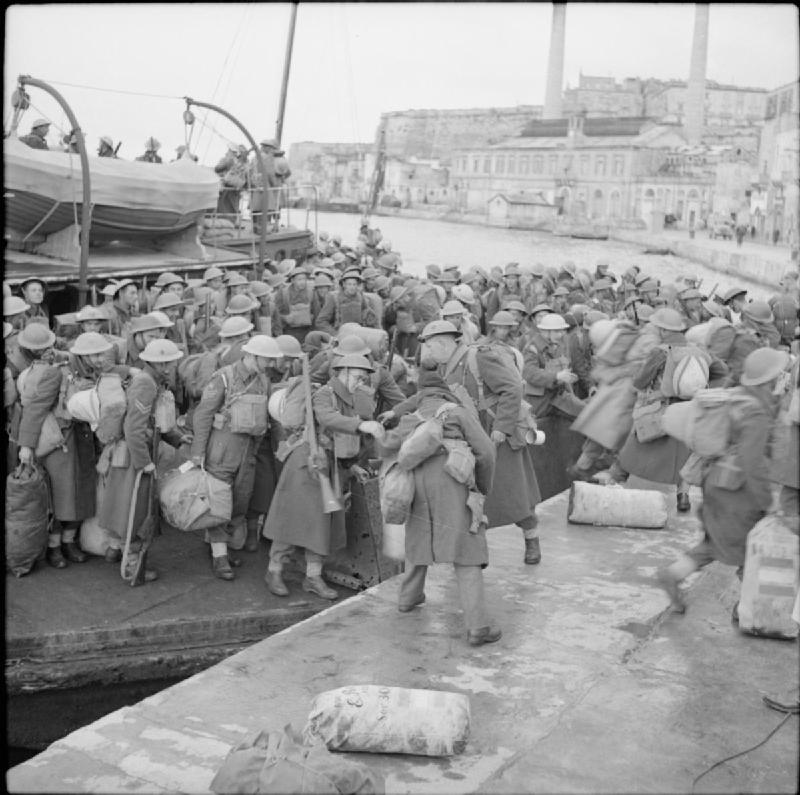
British Troops come ashore from ships in Grand Harbour, Valletta.

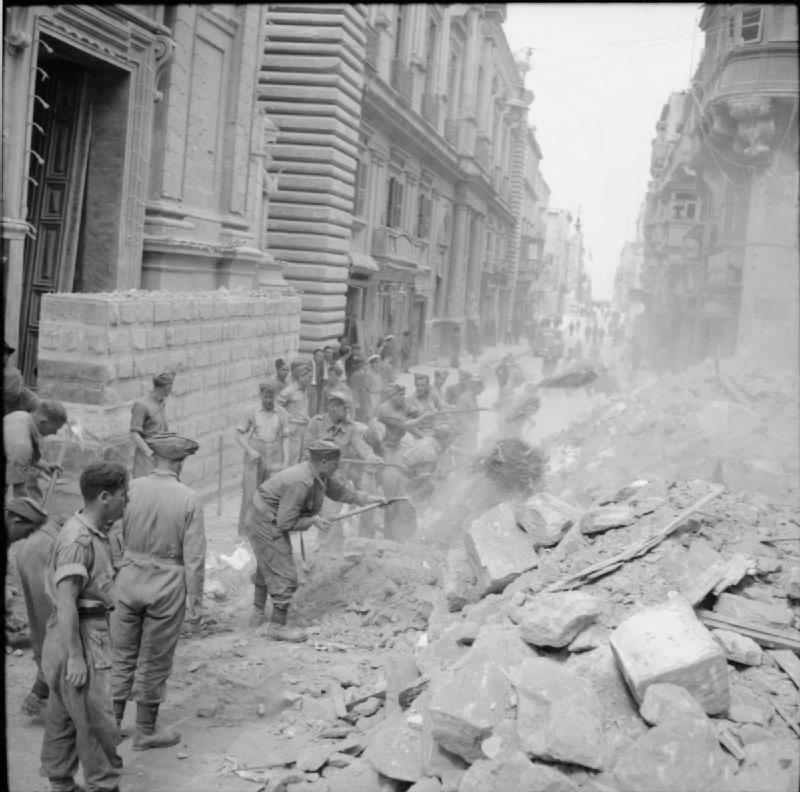
British troops help clear a bomb-damaged Kingsway in Valletta, 11 May 1942.

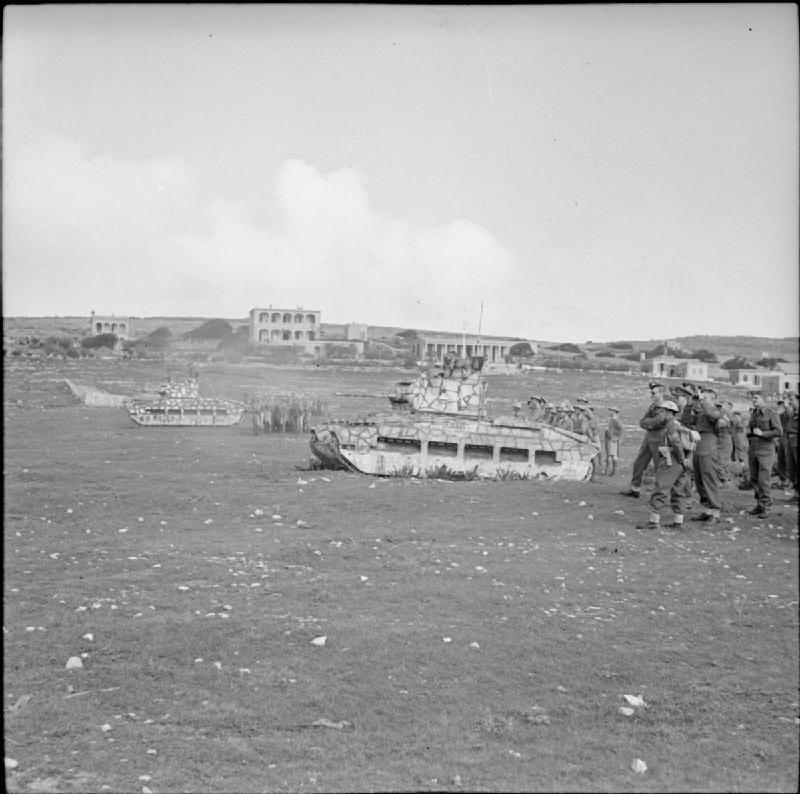
A pair of RTR Matilda tanks (painted in distinctive Malta camouflage) taking part in a gunnery demonstration.

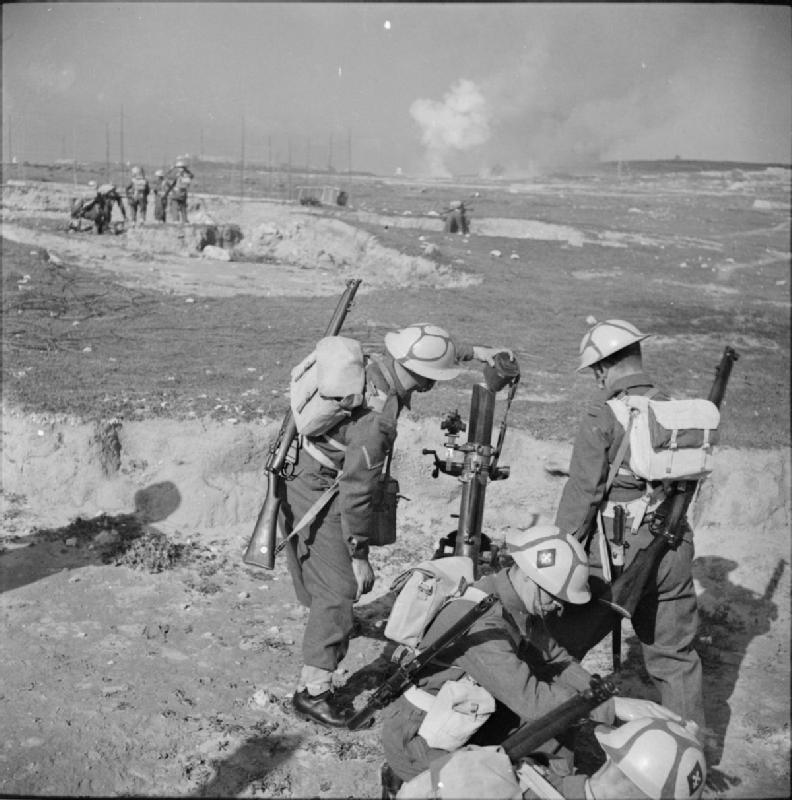
Infantry 3 inch mortars firing during an exercise. Note helmets are painted in Malta camouflage and the soldiers are carrying SMLE .303 rifles.

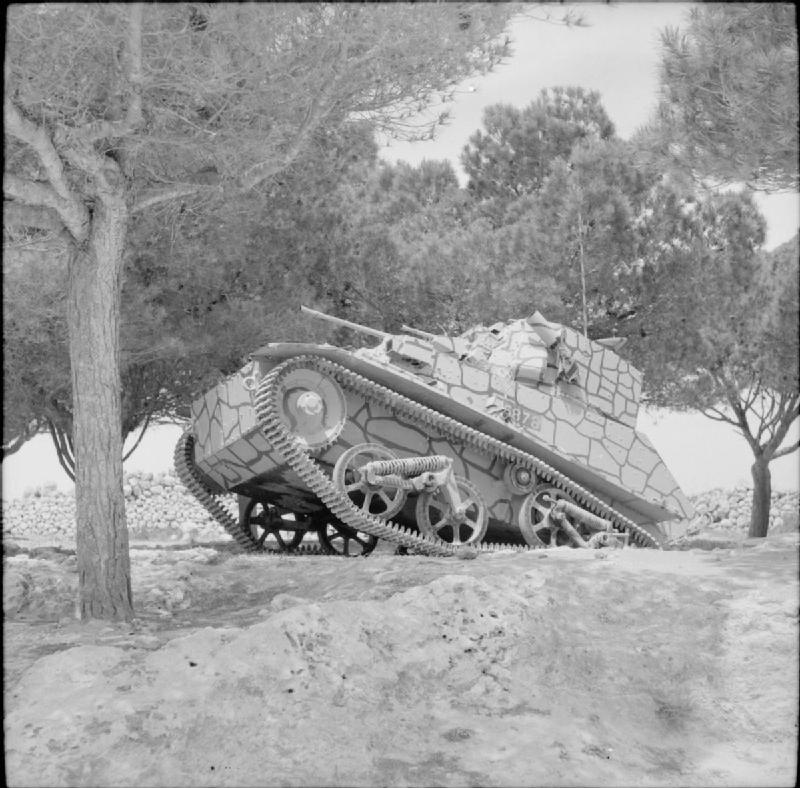
A Vickers MkVIc Light Tank on patrol in the Maltese countryside

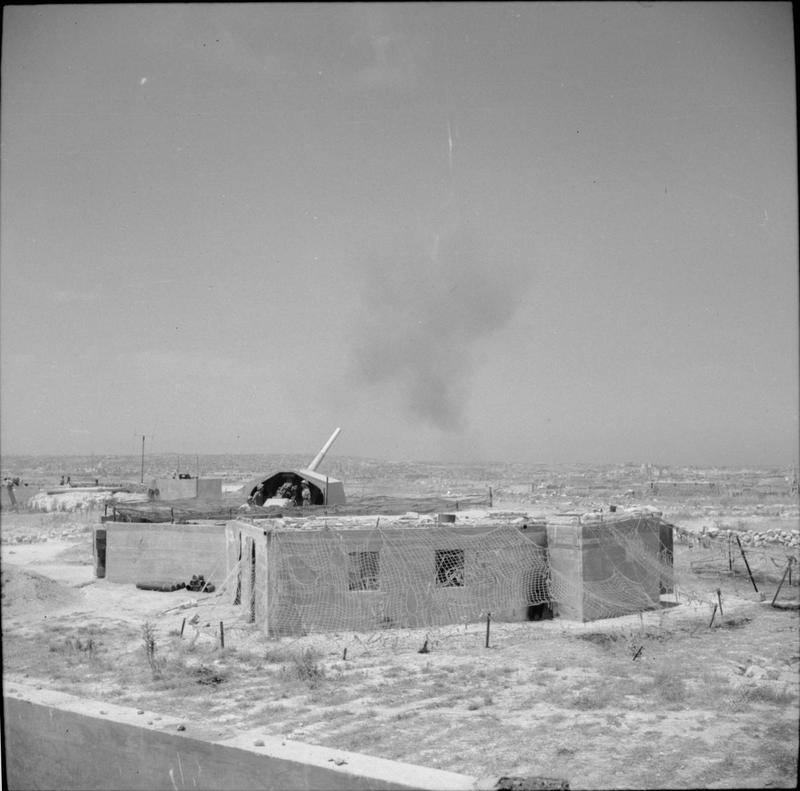
A 4.5-inch anti-aircraft gun engages Axis aircraft during an air raid on Malta.

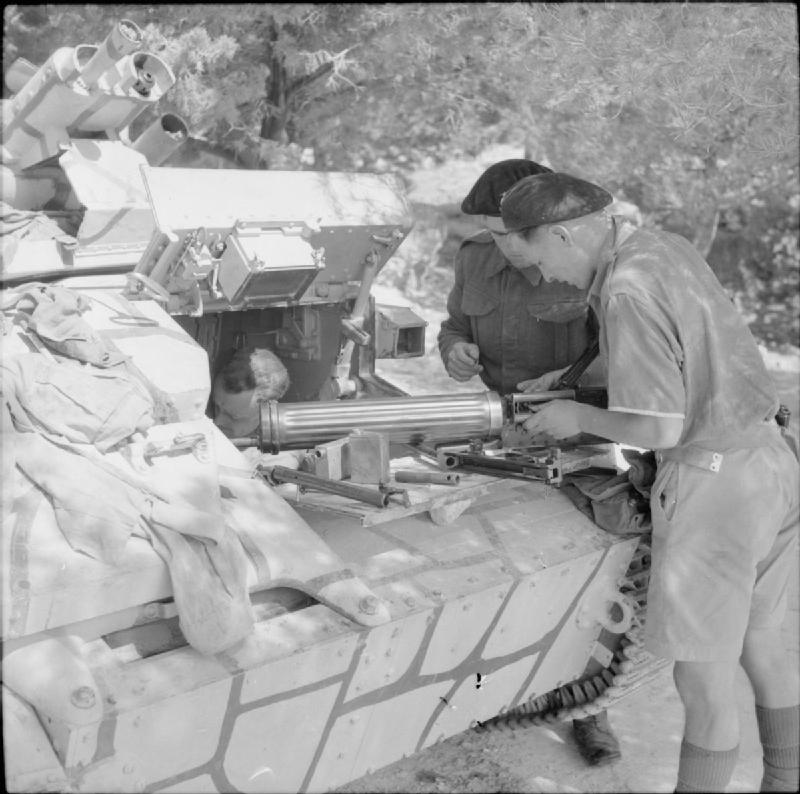
The crew of a Vickers Mk VIb Light Tank servicing one of their Vickers machine guns in the field. Note stone wall camouflage paintwork unique to Malta Command.

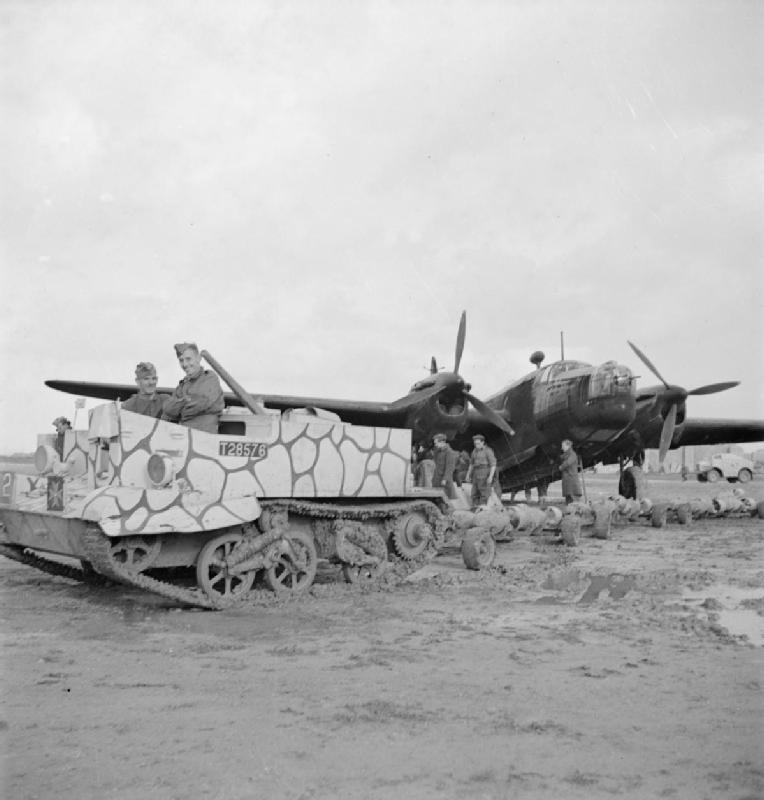
In muddy conditions an army Universal Carrier is used to tow a trolley-load of 250-lb bombs to a Vickers Wellington at RAF Luqa.

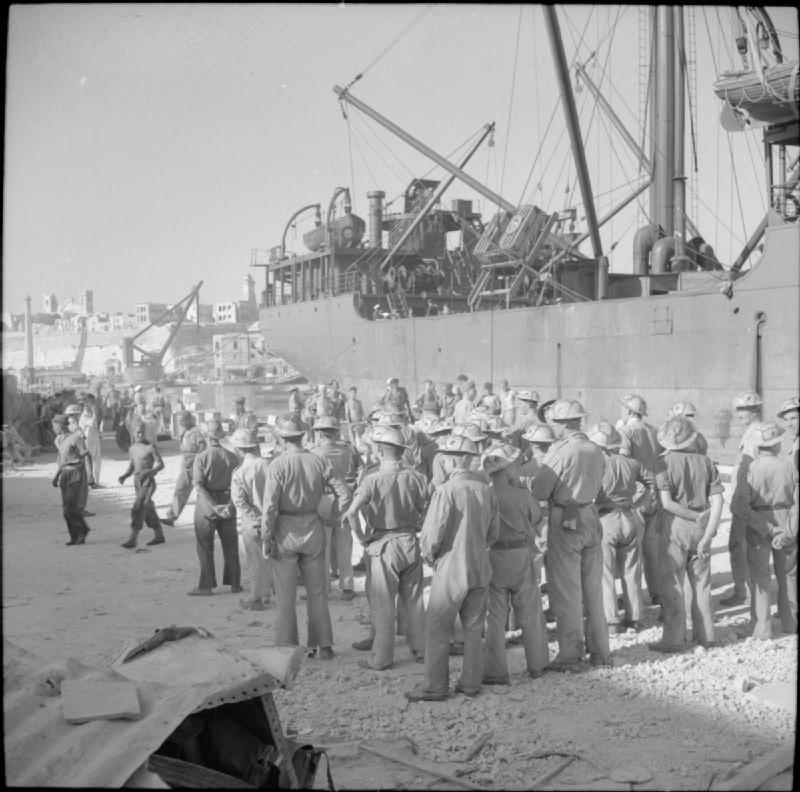
Soldiers organised in a fatigue party wait to board a merchant ship to unload supplies at one of Valletta's docks.

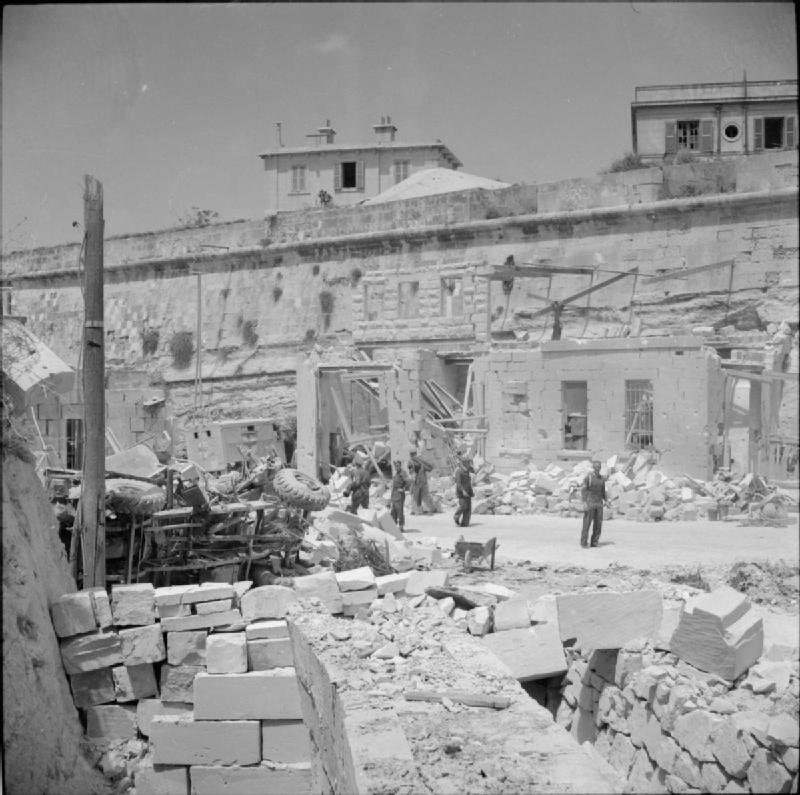
Bomb damage to 32 Company RASC's motor transport depot in Floriana, 20 March 1942.

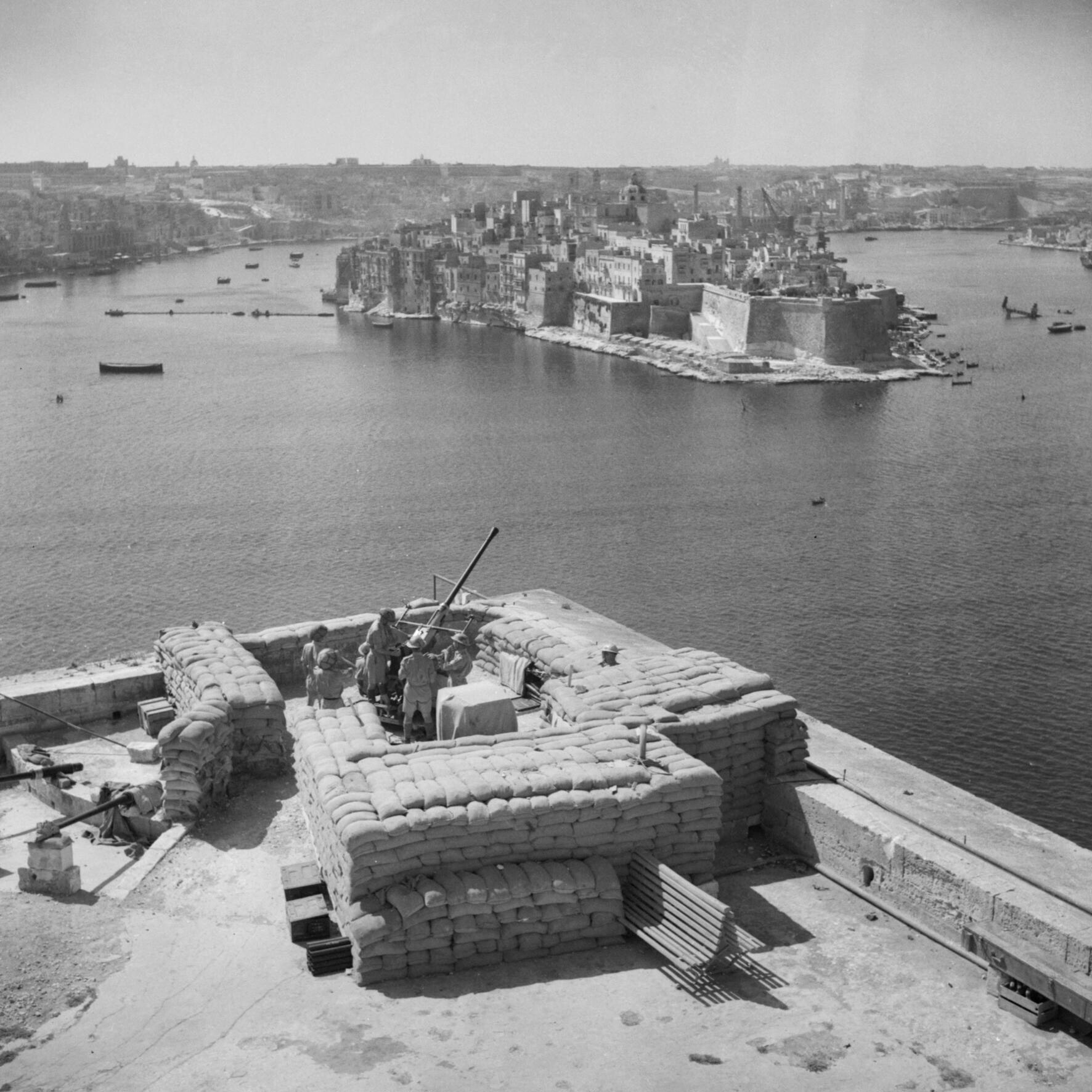
A 40mm Bofors anti-aircraft gun position overlooking Grand Harbour, located at Upper Barrakka Gardens looking across the harbour to Senglea.

== World War I and the Interwar years ==
Malta Command existed in 1916, 1917 and in 1929.

Between 1935 and 1936 the following infantry battalions were on the Island and part of Malta Command:

- 2nd Battalion The Lincolnshire Regiment;
- 2nd Battalion The Rifle Brigade; and
- 1st Battalion The King's Own Scottish Borderers.

== 1939 - the peacetime garrison transitions to war ==
Malta's garrison was a single infantry brigade comprising the 2nd Battalion the Devonshire Regiment, 2nd Battalion the Queen's Own Royal West Kent Regiment, 1st Battalion the Dorsetshire Regiment and the 2nd Battalion the Royal Irish Fusiliers. An infantry territorial unit was also present: the 1st Battalion The King's Own Malta Regiment. The Malta garrison's artillery was largely fixed and consisted of light and heavy anti-aircraft, as well as coastal defence artillery regiments drawn from the Royal Artillery (RA) and Royal Malta Artillery (RMA). The Royal Engineers were also in evidence with British and Maltese serving in the Corps on the Island.

== The Reinforced Army Garrison ==
On 11 March 1942, Malta Command became subordinate to General Headquarters (GHQ) Middle East.

=== Infantry ===
In late 1939, the pre-war garrison was reinforced up to an infantry division (commanded by Major General Sir John Scobell). The original infantry garrison, plus the three brigades that reinforced the island's British forces, were titled 1, 2, 3, and 4 Brigades; but were subsequently renumbered in 1943 as follows:

- 231 Infantry Brigade – assigned to the Southern Sector under Brig L H Cox. HQ Southern Infantry Brigade at Luqa. Its infantry battalions were:
  - 2nd Battalion The Devonshire Regiment
  - 1st Battalion The Hampshire Regiment
  - 1st Battalion The Dorsetshire Regiment
  - 2nd Battalion The King’s Own Malta Regiment
  - 3rd Battalion The King’s Own Malta Regiment
- 232 Infantry Brigade – assigned to the Northern Sector under Brig W H Oxley. HQ Northern Infantry Brigade at Melita Hotel Attard next to San Anton Gardens. Its infantry battalions were:
  - 2nd Battalion, Royal Irish Fusiliers
  - 8th Battalion, King's Own Royal Regiment (Lancaster)
  - 8th Battalion, Manchester Regiment
- 233 Infantry Brigade – formed on 30 July 1941; assigned to the Central Sector under Brig I De La Bere. Its infantry battalions were:
  - 11th Battalion The Lancashire Fusiliers
  - 2nd Battalion The Queen’s Own Royal West Kent Regiment
  - 10th Battalion The King’s Own Malta Regiment
- 234 Infantry Brigade – assigned to the Western sector under Brig F Brittorous. Its infantry battalions were:
  - 4th Battalion The Royal East Kent Regiment (The Buffs)
  - 1st Battalion The Durham Light Infantry
  - 1st Battalion The Cheshire Regiment

Clifford Thomason Beckett remained at the Fortress of Malta for several years from 1941 and rose to the rank of Major-General of the Royal Artillery & Commander Anti-Aircraft Defences Malta. During July and August 1942, Beckett acted as General Officer Commanding Troops for Malta following the departure of Major-General Daniel Marcus William Beak, VC, DSO, MC & Bar.

==== Light support weapons ====
Name	Type	Photo	Notes
Two-inch mortar	Light infantry mortar		Each infantry battalion had 3 tubes per fighting platoon - circa 30
. 55-inch Boys anti-tank rifle	Platoon anti-tank weapon		Each infantry battalion had one per fighting platoon - circa 10. It was not a popular weapon to fire because of its extreme recoil and German tank armour was too difficult to penetrate, it was phased out in favour of weapons like the PIAT
.303 Lewis Light Machine Gun (LMG)	Platoon fire support weapon		Some infantry battalion (e.g. KOMR) had Lewis Guns in lieu of Bren LMGs. This was a WW1 design weapon but highly regarded because of the gun's magazine capacity and rate of fire
.303 Bren LMG	Platoon fire support weapon		Each infantry battalion had three per fighting platoon and on other fire support vehicles - circa 40

Personal weapons such as the .303-in SMLE, 9mm Sten or .38 service revolver are not included in this study.

=== Artillery ===
The Island's regular Royal Artillery force component was - like its Maltese counterpart - performing a mainly fixed defence role, even wheeled artillery tended to occupy fixed positions to defend against a hostile landing at beaches:

- 4th Coast Regiment, RA made up of (a HQ Battery, 6th, 10th & 23rd Coast Batteries)
- 12th Field Regiment RA - initially equipped with 18 Pounder Field Guns, but later equipped with 25 Pounder Field Guns (the only real mobile artillery support for the infantry brigades).
- 26th Defence Regiment, RA made up of (a HQ Battery, 15th/40th & 48th/71st Defence Batteries).
- The Royal Malta Artillery
  - Headquarters, RMA
  - 1st Coast Regiment, RMA composed of (a HQ Battery, 1st, 2nd, 3rd & 4th Heavy Batteries)

The anti-aircraft defence was understandably dense and British and Maltese anti-aircraft (AA) units were interwoven into the following order of battle:

- 7th Anti-Aircraft Brigade
  - 32nd Light Anti-Aircraft Regiment RA
  - 65th Light Anti-Aircraft Regiment RA
  - 74th Light Anti-Aircraft Regiment RA
  - 3rd Light Anti-Aircraft Regiment RMA
  - 4th Searchlight Regiment RA/RMA
- 10th Anti-Aircraft Brigade
  - 4th Heavy Anti-Aircraft Regiment RA
  - 7th Heavy Anti-Aircraft Regiment RA
  - 10th Heavy Anti-Aircraft Regiment RA
  - 2nd Heavy Anti-Aircraft Regiment RMA
  - 11th Heavy Anti-Aircraft Battery RMA.

==== Heavy support weapons ====
By 1940 Malta Command had a small amount of modern mobile field artillery, much of its artillery was located in fixed positions in the anti-aircraft and coastal defence royal. It was manned by members of the Royal Artillery and Royal Malta Artillery.

Name	Type	Photo	Notes
.303 Vickers machine gun	Battalion fire support weapon		Each infantry battalion had four guns normally in a single Machine Gun Platoon
3 Inch Mortar	Infantry mortar - battalion indirect fire support		Each infantry battalion had 6 mortar tubes
QF 2-pounder gun	Infantry anti-tank weapon		Each infantry battalion had two carried portee or dismounted in a 15cwt truck
QF 18-pounder gun Field gun/Howitzer	Multi-role mobile field artillery		One RA coastal defence regiment of 24 guns
QF 25-pounder gun field gun/howitzer	Multi-role mobile field artillery		One RA field regiment of 24 guns

For details of fixed artillery see Royal Malta Artillery's equipment list.

=== Royal Armoured Corps ===
Less than a full battalion of various reconnaissance and infantry support tanks was present on Malta.

By 1942 Malta Command Tanks had a small mixed force of tanks known as "Malta Tanks, Royal Tank Regiment" during its time on the island. The only other armoured vehicles were the Universal Carriers of the infantry units.

Name	Type	Notes
Light Tank Mk VI (Marks VIb&c)	Reconnaissance tank	Turret with 0.303 Vickers machine gun and 0.5 inch Vickers machine gun or turret with 15 mm and 7.92 mm Besa machine guns. Three Deployed
Matilda II	Infantry tank	40mm QF-2 pdr gun and 7.92 mm Besa coaxial machine gun. Four deployed
Cruiser Mk III	Cruiser tank	40mm QF-2 pdr gun and 7.92 mm Besa coaxial machine gun. Eight deployed
Valentine (Mark III)	Infantry tank	40mm QF-2 pdr gun and 7.92 mm Besa coaxial machine gun. Four deployed
Universal Carrier ("Bren Gun Carrier")	Lightly armoured tracked carrier	.55 Boys anti-tank rifle and/or .303 Bren light machine gun. Ten deployed with each infantry battalion

=== Combat and service support units ===
- Royal Engineers
  - 16th Fortress Company
  - 24th Fortress Company
  - 173rd Tunnel Company
  - 2 Works Company
  - 127th Bomb Disposal Section
  - 128th Bomb Disposal Section
- Malta Command Signals, Royal Signals
  - 8 Special Wireless Squadron
- Royal Army Medical Corps
  - 39 General Hospital RAMC
  - 45 General Hospital RAMC
  - 90 General Hospital RAMC
  - 15 Field Ambulance RAMC
  - 161 Field Ambulance RAMC
- 69 Field Security Section Intelligence Corps
- 226 Provost Company Royal Military Police
- Royal Army Service Corps
  - 32 Company RASC (MT)
  - Malta Supply Depot RASC
  - Water Transport Company RASC
- Royal Army Ordnance Corps
- A static Royal Electrical Mechanical Engineers Workshops at Pembroke Garrison
- 72 Detachment Royal Army Pay Corps
- Royal Army Chaplains' Department.

=== Local Maltese units (Regular and Territorial) ===
Critical to the success and resilience of Malta's was local commitment and bravery the following units were fully integrated in Malta Command:

- The Royal Malta Artillery
- The King's Own Malta Regiment
- The Malta Fortress Squadron, Royal Engineers.

== End of the war and the post war period ==
On 2 December 1944 Malta Command regained its status as an independent command and it ceased its command relationship with GHQ Middle East in Cairo. The British would remember the war in a somewhat detached and romanticised fashion in films like The Malta Story; the Maltese never had a chance to record their views being viewed as 'plucky' citizens of a British colony.

General Officers Commanding from 1951-62 were:

- Major-General William E.G. Hemming: October 1951-November 1953
- Major-General Brian Daunt: November 1953-November 1956
- Major-General Cyril Colquhoun: November 1956-December 1959
- Major-General Adam J.C. Block: December 1959-October 1962

In 1954 Headquarters Malta Command occupied the Auberge de Castille, known locally as "The Castille". British Troops Malta became again part of Middle East Land Forces in 1960.

Forces in Malta would be reduced from 1964 and this led to acrimony between the Maltese and British Governments, and the post independence period was a period of bitterness, British forces on the Island in the front line of Maltese antipathy. Major-General Lord Thurlow commanded in 1962-63. In 1965, 4th (Leicestershire) Battalion, the Royal Anglian Regiment arrived to join Malta Garrison at St. Patrick's Barracks on the north coast of Malta. Under Brigadier Lord Grimthorpe OBE, Malta Garrison consisted of 4 R Anglian; 1 Battalion The Loyal Regiment; 1st Regiment Royal Malta Artillery (partially a transport regiment); and 1st Battalion King's Own Malta Regiment (TA). Malta Garrison was in turn responsible to HQ Malta and Libya, under Major-General John Frost, with the other components being HQ Cyrenaica Area and HQ Tripolitania Area in Libya. Later, Major General Rea Leakey commanded HQ Malta and Libya in 1967-68.

1 Regiment Royal Malta Artillery served in Germany within the British Army of the Rhine from 1962 to 1970. In 1968 the then Prime Minister of Malta George Borg Olivier visited the Regiment in its barracks in Mulheim, and announced that the 1st Regiment RMA would cease to be part of the British Army of the Rhine in 1970 and could return to Malta to form the core of its land forces. Five hundred officers and men from the Royal Malta Artillery took their oath of allegiance and were enlisted in the Malta Land Force on 1 October 1970. Maltese Engineer and Signals personnel were also absorbed into the force that day.

Malta Command was largely wound up by 1977 with all major units repatriated to the UK. Salerno Company of 41 Commando Royal Marines finally left the island aboard the Royal Fleet Auxiliary Landing Ship Logistic Sir Lancelot on 31 March 1979.

== See also ==
- Siege of Malta (World War II)
- Lascaris War Rooms
- Operation Herkules
- Royal Signals in Malta
- Middle East Command
- Malta Story (the film)
- Operation Husky
- British Army during the Second World War
