= 6th Royal Tank Regiment =

Armoured regiment of the British Army

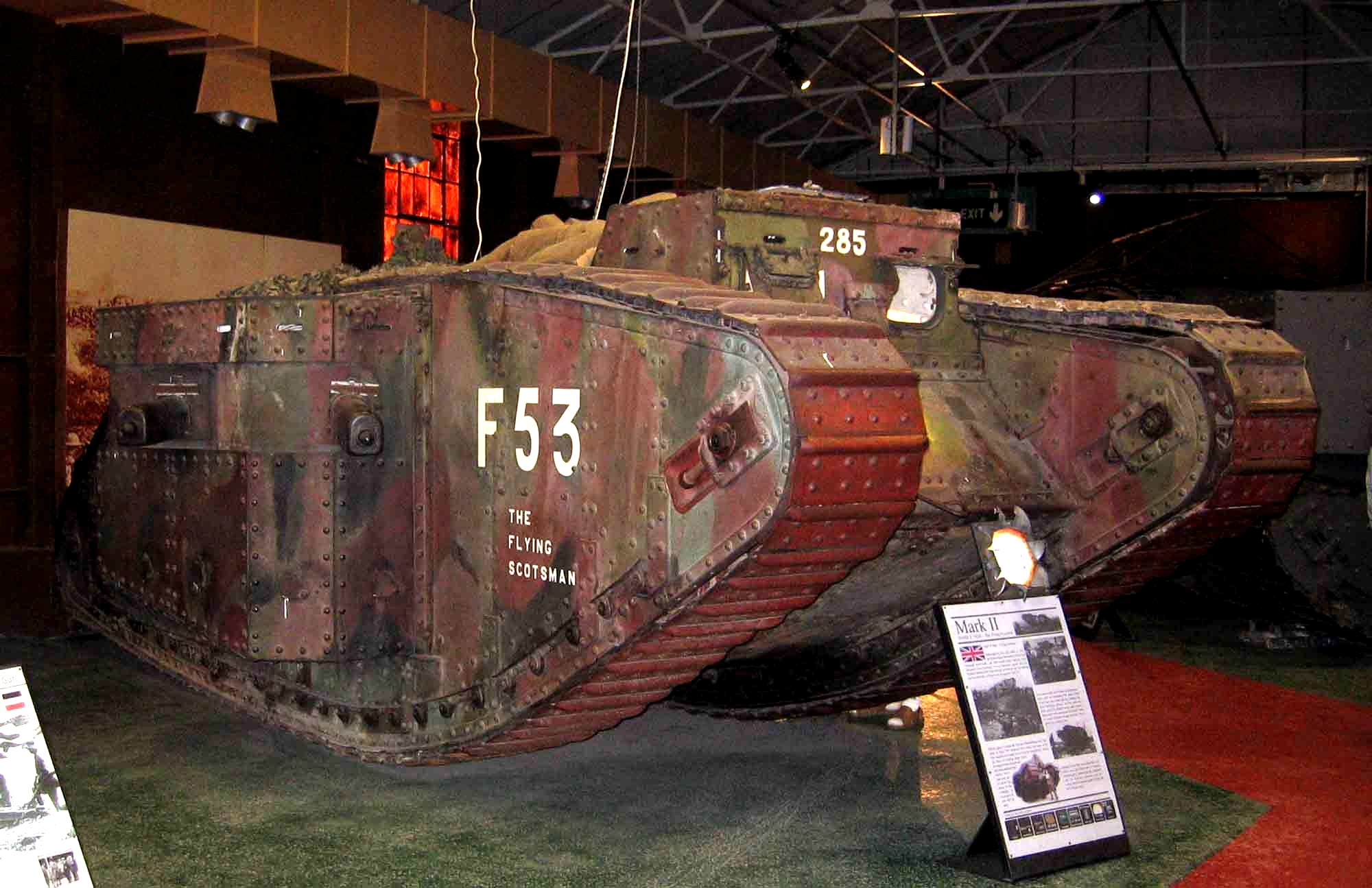
Mark II tank F53 "The Flying Scotsman", formerly of F Battalion Tank Corps, at Bovington Tank Museum

The 6th Royal Tank Regiment (6 RTR) was a regiment of the Royal Tank Regiment, of the British Army, until 1959. It originally saw action as 6th Battalion Tank Corps in 1917.

== First World War ==
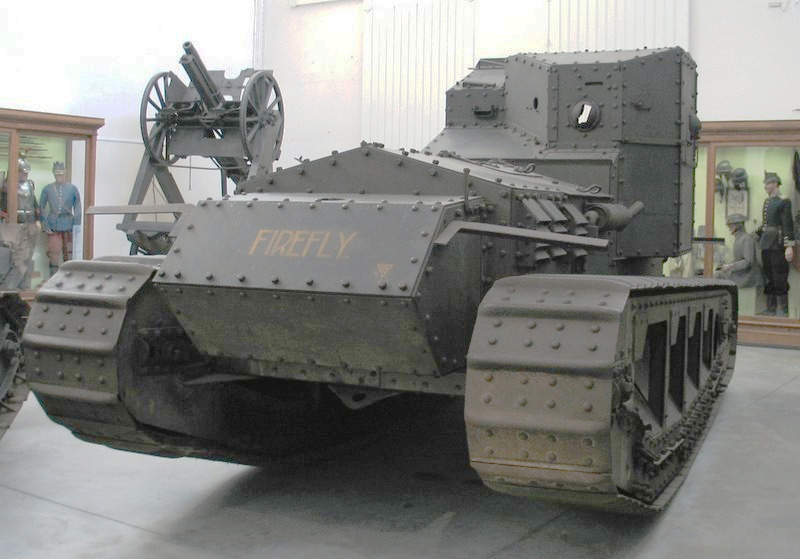
Whippet Mk A tank A347 "Firefly", of 6th Battalion Tank Corps, currently in the Museum of the Army in Brussels

When tanks were first used in action in 1916, they were operated by the Heavy Branch of the Machine Gun Corps. This constituted six companies, A through F. With the rapid growth of the tank forces, these companies were used as the cadre of new battalions, which were quickly transferred to the newly formed Tank Corps, and then changed from letters to numbers. F Company thus became F Battalion of the Heavy Branch in November 1916, then F Battalion of the Tank Corps, then redesignated as 6th Battalion of the Tank Corps in January 1918.

During this time, the unit saw heavy action; it fought at the Battle of Messines, Passchendaele, Cambrai, Amiens (using Whippet Mk A light tanks), Bapaume, 2nd Arras and Cambrai-St Quentin.

During this time, a Victoria Cross was awarded to Captain Richard Annesley West of the North Irish Horse, at the time an acting Lieutenant-Colonel commanding 6th Battalion Tank Corps. This was one of only four VCs awarded to the Corps during the Great War.

== Inter-war period ==
After the Armistice, the Tank Corps was severely cut down; from twenty-six battalions in 1919 to four by the early 1920s. The 6th Battalion was one of those disbanded, with its remaining personnel being transferred to the 3rd Battalion in November 1919.

In the 1930s, the decision was taken to expand the Royal Tank Corps ("Royal" had been added to the regimental title in 1923). Two Royal Tank Corps armoured car companies in Egypt, the 3rd and 5th, were brought together and reformed as 6th Battalion, Royal Tank Corps. However, this unit was understrength - it only consisted of two companies - and was not brought up to full strength with a third company until early 1939, by which time it had been renamed the 6th Royal Tank Regiment.

== Second World War ==
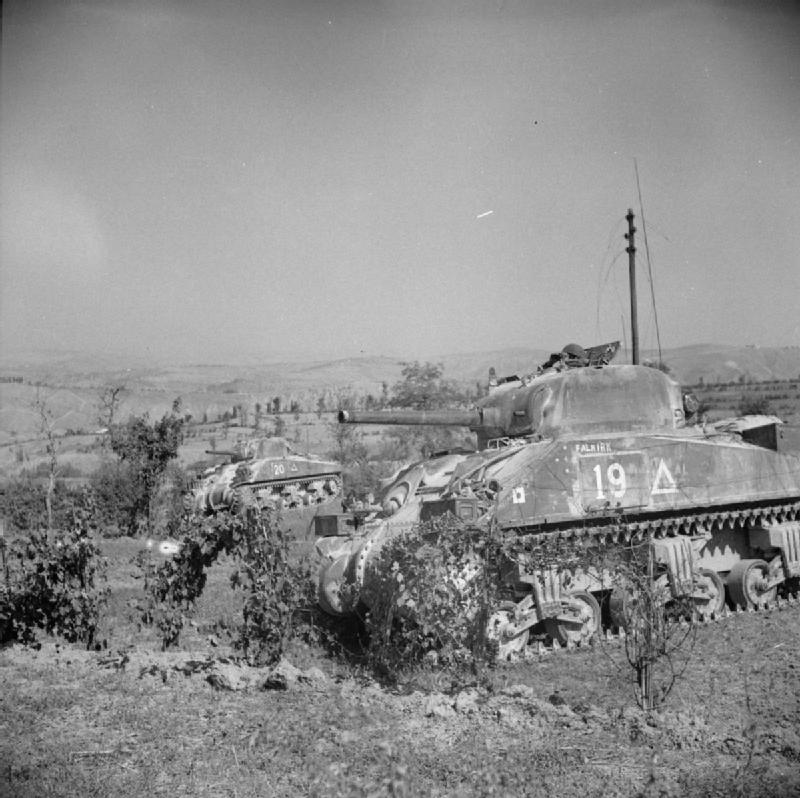
Two Sherman tanks of 6 RTR in action against German machine-gun positions on the walls of San Marino, 19 September 1944

When the war broke out in 1939, 6 RTR was based in Egypt with the Heavy Armoured Brigade (Egypt), part of the Armoured Division (Egypt). It was equipped with a mixture of Mk VIb light tanks, Mark II medium tanks, and Mk I Cruiser tanks. It provided a squadron of tanks for Malta in 1942, which made up an armoured force called Malta Tanks.

== Postwar ==
6 RTR saw action during the Suez Crisis in 1956, where HQ, B and C Squadrons were landed to support Operation Musketeer. In 1948, the Regiment was located at Scofton aerodrome (RAF Worksop), in Nottinghamshire, training TA's from 45 Leeds Rifles. In 1959 it was amalgamated with 3rd Royal Tank Regiment
