= Royal Malta Artillery =

British artillery unit

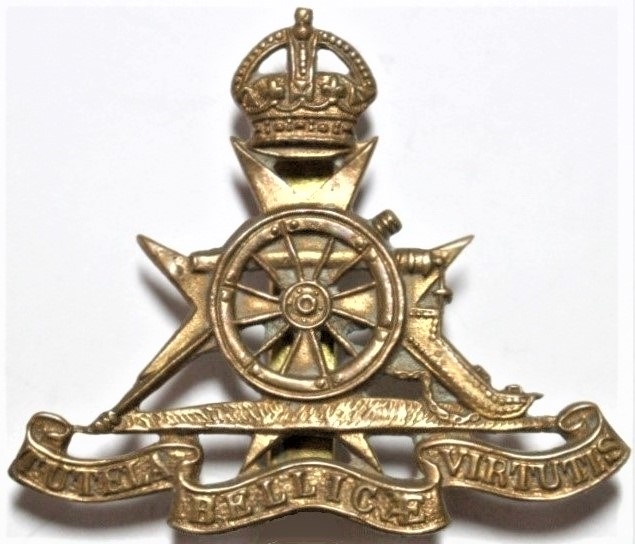
- Cap badge
- Founded: 1889
- Disbanded: 1970
- Headquarters: Fort St Elmo, Valletta

Personnel
- Conscription: Volunteer and Territorial Force
- Deployed personnel: Western Desert and BAOR

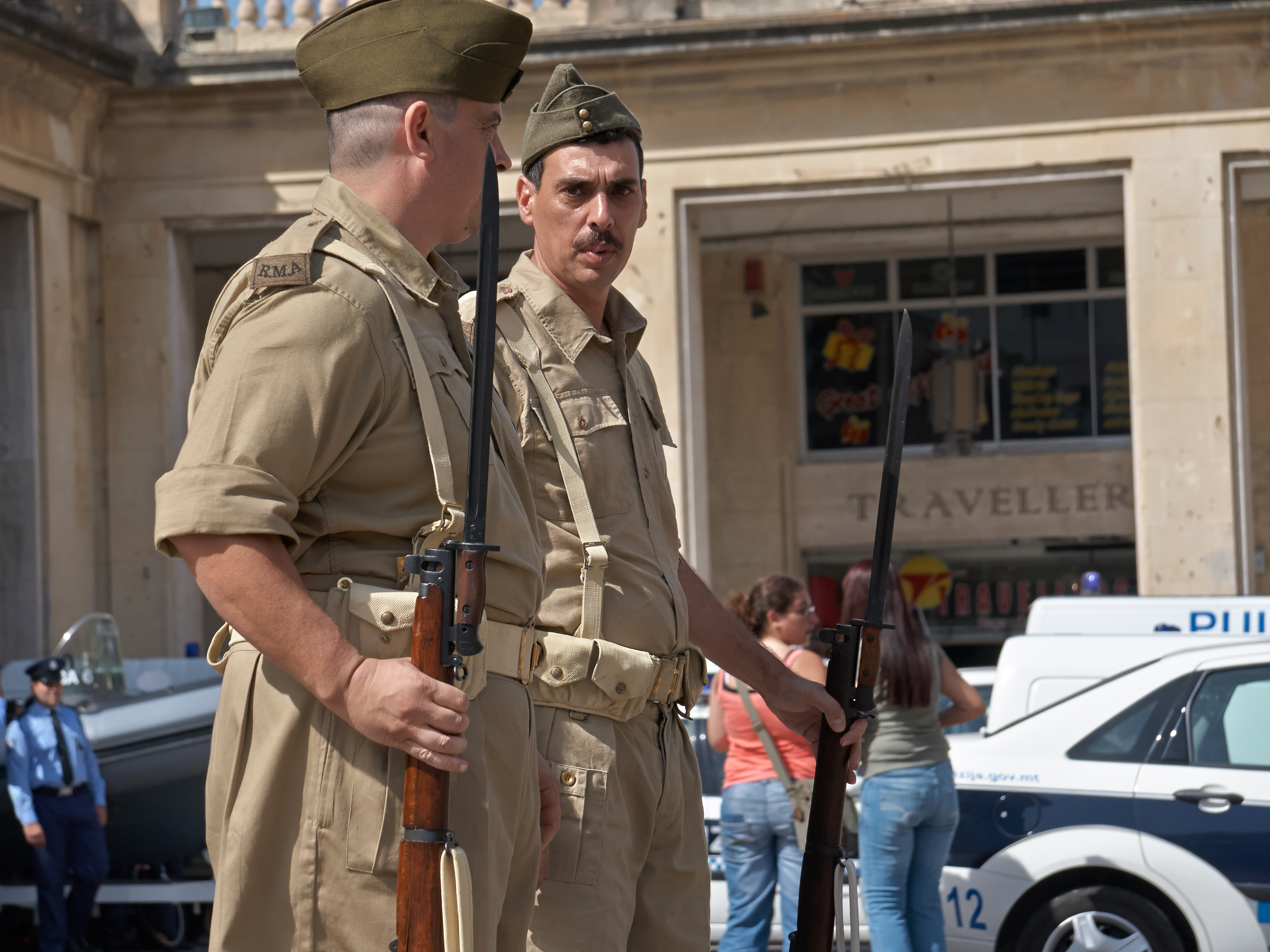
Soldiers from a RMA living history group wearing WWII-era Khaki drill uniforms and carrying .303 SMLE rifles on guard duty in Valletta in 2008

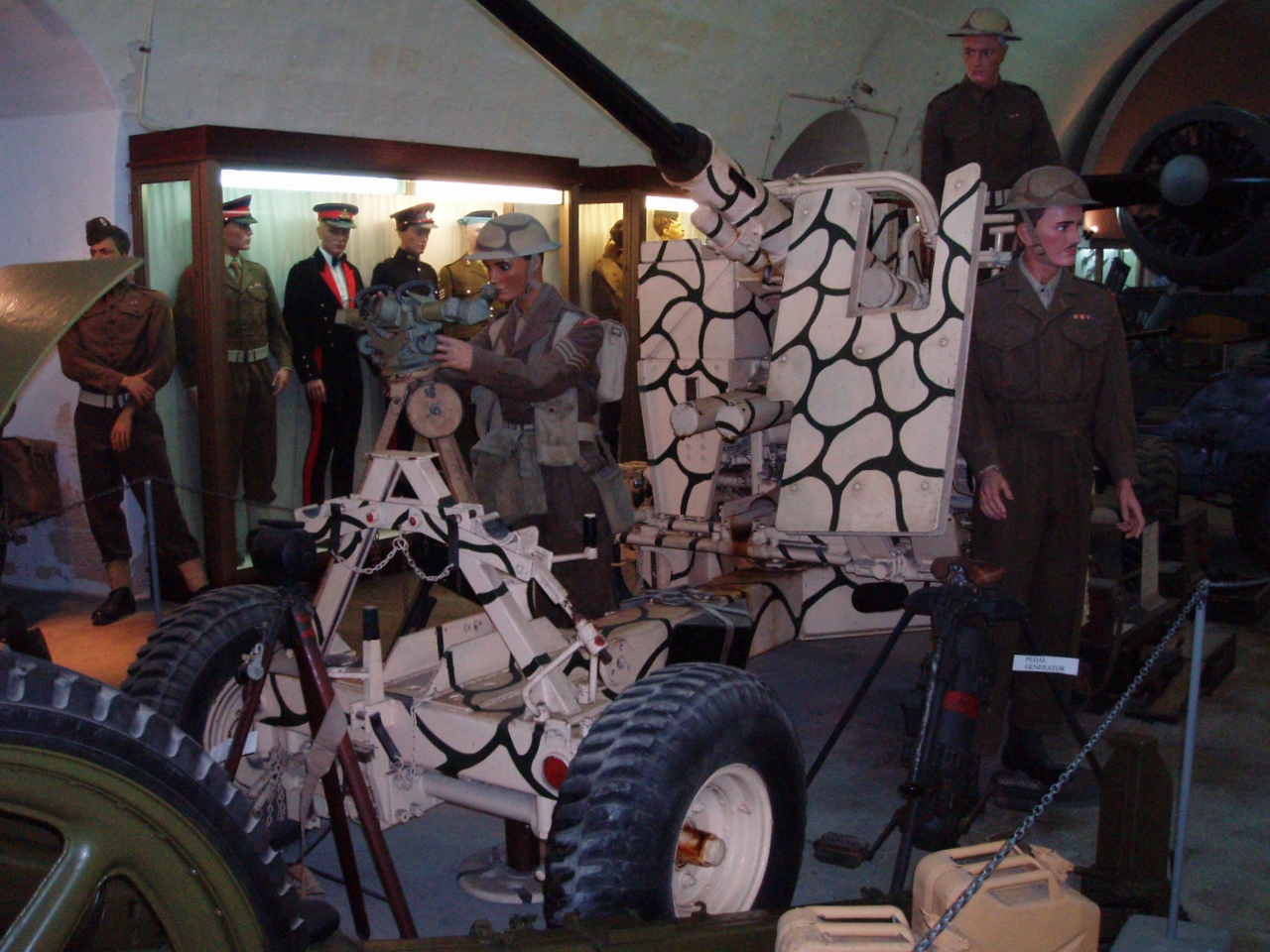
A 40mm Bofors Anti-Aircraft gun used by the RMA in WWII. Note characteristic Malta rock camouflage.

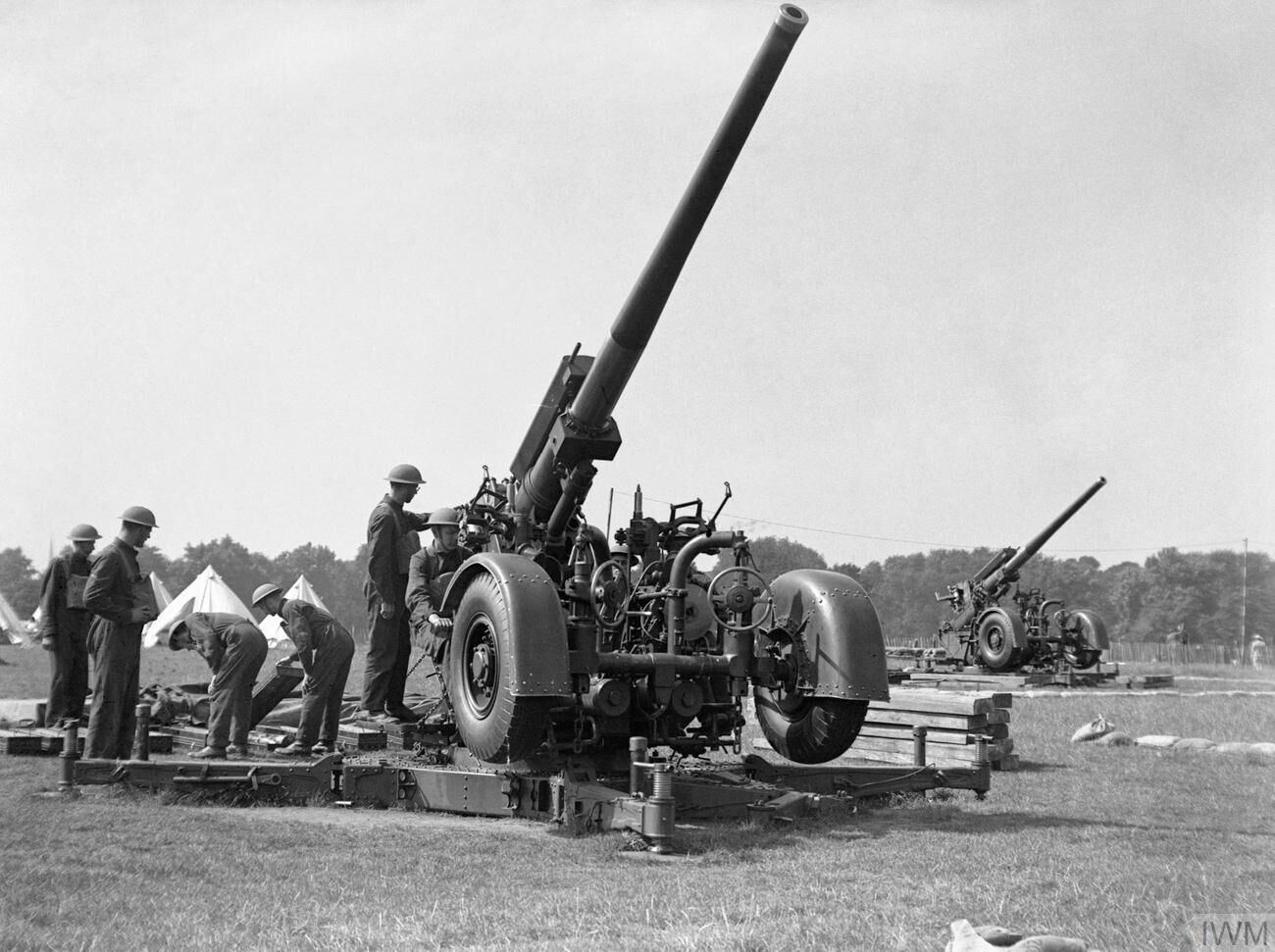
A 3.7-inch gun on a travelling carriage (not a Malta battery position)

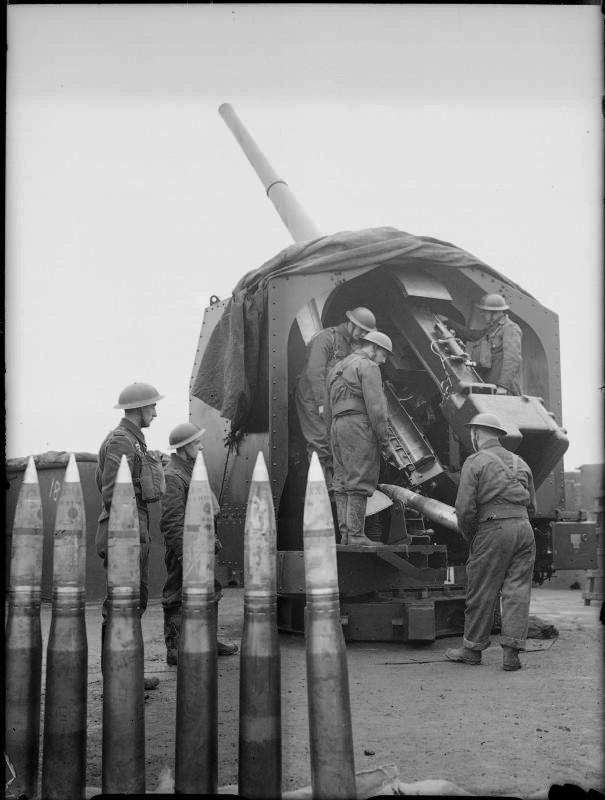
A 4.5-inch gun and crew (not a Malta battery position).

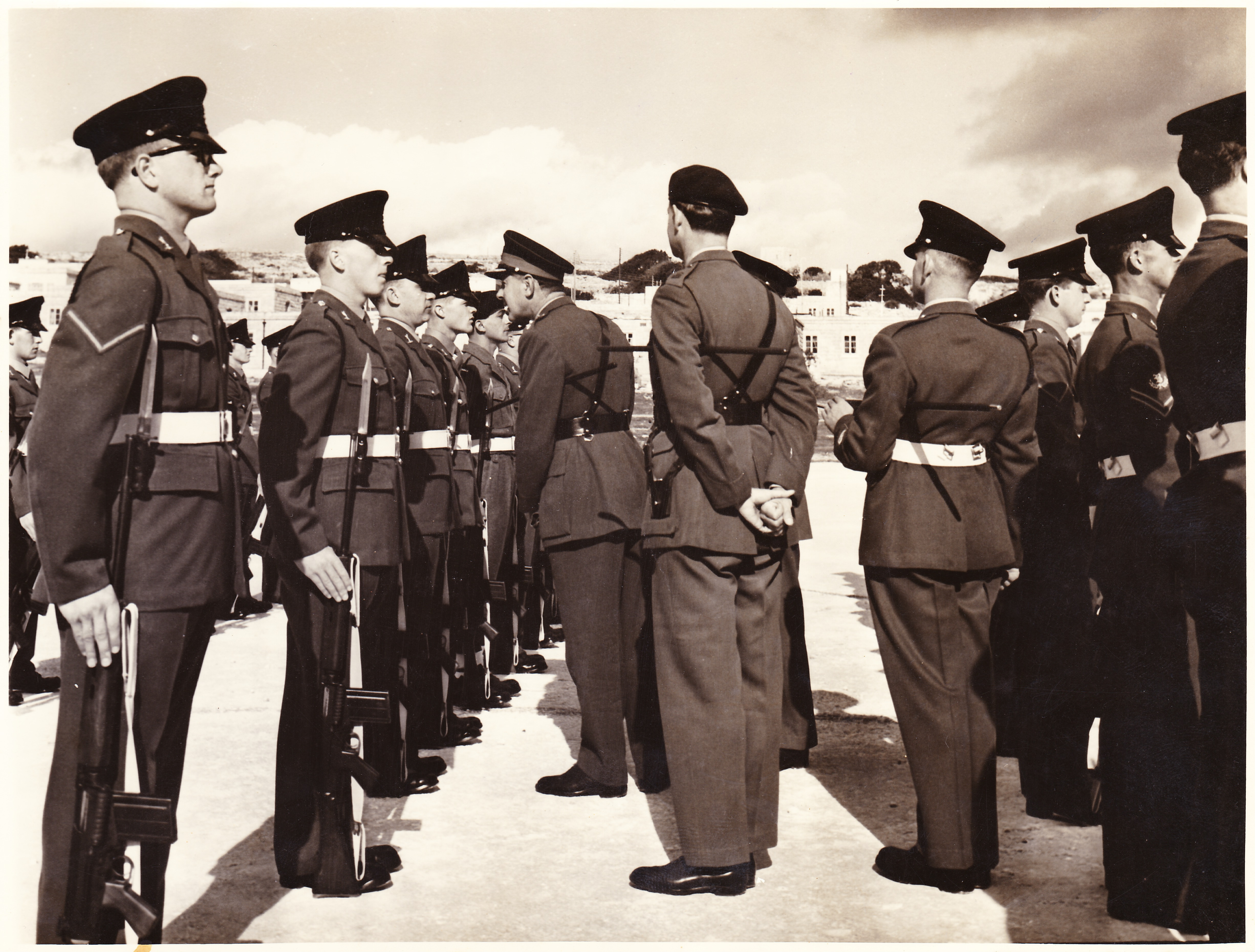
Gunners of the RMA's 3 Light Anti Aircraft Artillery and 11 Heavy Anti Aircraft Regiments of the Royal Malta Artillery on parade in November 1959

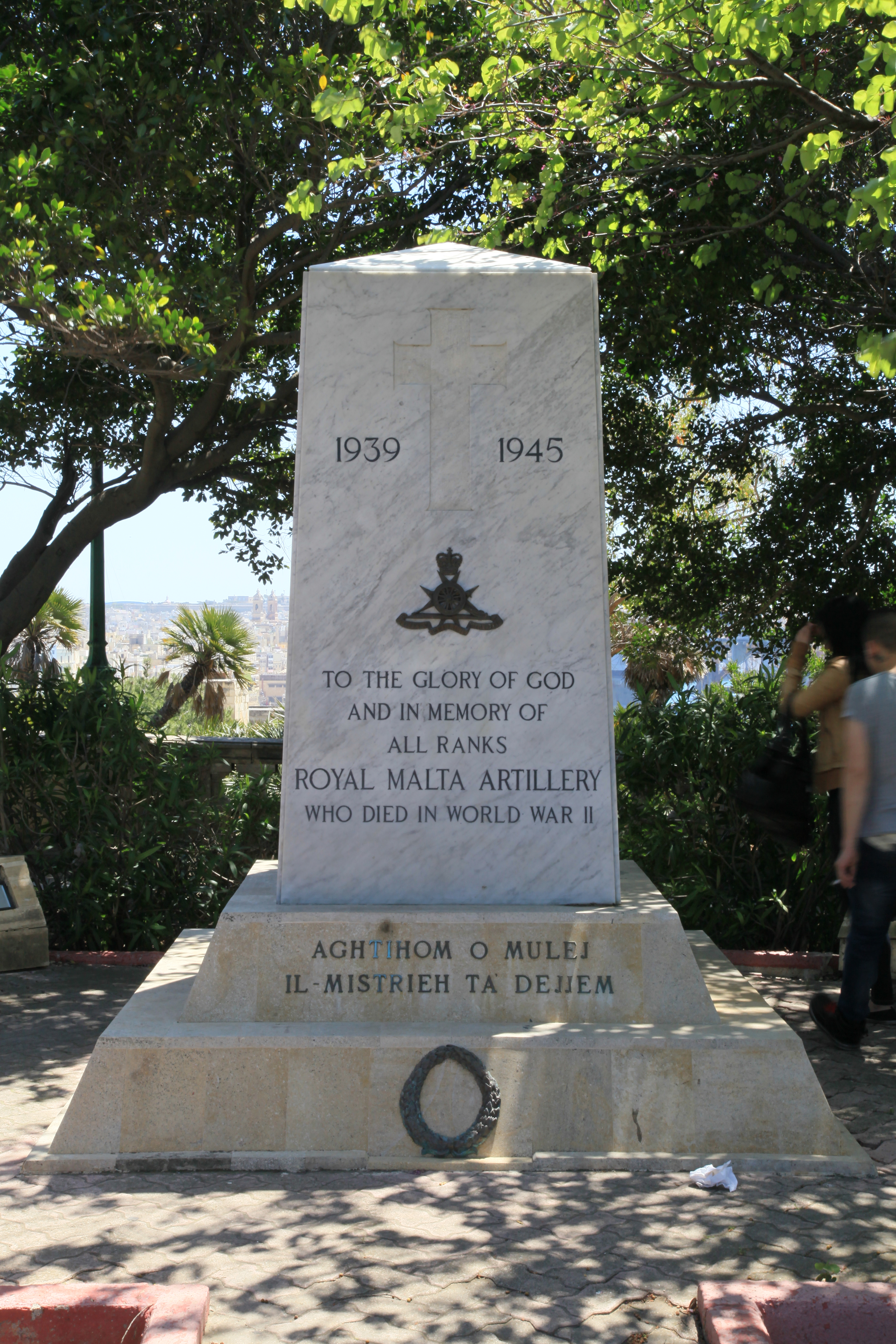
The RMA's war memorial on St. Anne Street in Floriana

The Royal Malta Artillery (RMA) was a regular artillery unit of the British Army prior to Malta's independence. It was formed in 1889, having been called the Royal Malta Fencible Artillery from 1861 until 1889.

Initially on the British Establishment, the regiment was disbanded in 1970 with its personnel and equipment being handed over to the Maltese Government and becoming part of the Malta Land Force.

== History ==
=== Victorian era ===
The RMA was a compact force in the late Nineteenth Century and in 1891 it is recorded as being deployed as follows:

- Headquarters in Fort Lascaris
- Sub-units based at St Antonio's Gardens in Attard and Fort St Angelo.

Initially, the average strength of the RMA was 365 men, but by the beginning of the 20th century, the unit has more than doubled its size, with its HQ still at Fort Lascaris and two companies based at Fort St Angelo and Fort Salvatore at Cottonera. The unit had a total of eight companies two of which were earmarked for service beyond the island and one RMA Company would be deployed to serve in Egypt (Cairo and Alexandria) in the early 1900s. The Malta-based units were arranged as follows:

- HQ RMA was still at Fort Lascaris
- 1 Company was based at Fort Lascaris
- 2 Company was based at the Crucifix Bastion in Valletta
- 3 Company was based at Spinola Camp in the vicinity of the Spinola Battery
- 4 Company was based at Fort St Angelo
- 5 Company was based at Cairo, Egypt
- Depot Company was based at Fort Lascaris.

=== World War I ===
Up until the outbreak of hostilities the RMA had steadily been reduced to a Depot Company and Three Gun Companies (of various types and roles). In 1914 this trend was reversed and the RMA raised an extra company and was deployed thus:

- HQ and 1 Company based at Forts Lascaris, San Leonardo and Tigné
- 2 Company based at Fort Bingemma
- 3 Company based at Fort Mosta
- 4 Company also based at Tigné
- 5 Company would be raised in 1918 and based at Fort San Rocco.

=== Inter-war years ===
At the end of the Great War, the RMA were deployed to guarding POWs until 1920 when they were taken off this task and the unit was reduced to its pre-war three company order of battle (ORBAT). The RMA would spend the inter-war years acting as coastal and heavy anti-aircraft artillery. From 1938 onwards the RMA expanded to make up two coast regiments. one of which would become a heavy anti-aircraft regiment.

=== World War II ===
The RMA is known to have had the following units on its ORBAT: They were vital in repelling the Italian naval attack on Grand Harbour on 26 July 1941.

- 1 Coast Regiment, RMA, present 25 August 1941 & June 1943
- 2 Heavy Anti-Aircraft Regiment, RMA, present 1 January 1940; defending Ta' Qali airfield
- 3 Light Anti-Aircraft Regiment, RMA, present June 1941 (made up of 10, 15, 22 and 30 Batteries) - equipped with Bofors 40mm QF Guns
- 5 Coast Regiment, RMA
- 11 Heavy Anti-Aircraft Regiment, RMA (Territorial) present 1 January 1942
- 14 Heavy Anti-Aircraft (Relief) Battery, RMA, part of 4 Heavy Anti-Aircraft Regiment, RA
- 8 Searchlight Battery, RMA, part of the mixed British-Maltese 4 Searchlight Regiment, RA/RMA
- 13 Defence Battery, RMA, formed 22 August 1941 as part of 26 Defence Regiment, RA, transferred to 5 Coast Regiment, RMA, 1 June 1942

=== Post-war service in Germany ===
1 Regiment Royal Malta Artillery served in Germany within BAOR from 1962 to 1970. In 1968 the then Prime Minister of Malta George Borg Olivier visited the Regiment in its barracks in Mulheim, and announced that the 1st Regiment RMA would cease to be part of the British Army of the Rhine in 1970 and could return to Malta to form the core of its land forces. 500 officers and men from the Royal Malta Artillery took their oath of allegiance and were enlisted in the Malta Land Force (MLF) on 1 October 1970. Maltese Engineer and Signals personnel were also absorbed into the force that day.

== WWII uniforms and equipment ==
During World War II the RMA wore the same uniform as the British Army.

| Make | Origin | Type |
|---|---|---|
| Khaki drill | United Kingdom | Summer uniform |
| Battle dress | United Kingdom | Winter uniform |
| Side cap | United Kingdom | Headgear |
| Brodie helmet | United Kingdom | Helmet |
| 1937 pattern web equipment | United Kingdom | Webbing |

Most, if not all units stationed in Malta during World War II including the RMA had adopted a unique camouflage pattern on their helmets. This pattern attempted to replicate the rubble walls that are still commonly used to separate fields and properties in Malta. It was also applied to vehicles, bunkers and anti-aircraft guns.

== WWII small arms ==
During World War II the RMA used the same personal and crew-served weapons in service with the British Army.

| Make | Origin | Type |
|---|---|---|
| Lee–Enfield (Mk III) | United Kingdom | Bolt-action Rifle |
| Webley Revolver | Britain | Service Revolver |
| Bren light machine gun | United Kingdom | Light machine gun |
| Thompson submachine gun | United States | Submachine gun |
| Sten | United Kingdom | Submachine gun |

== WWII heavy weapons ==
During World War II the RMA used light and heavy anti-aircraft guns and searchlights to help defend the island against air attack.

| Make | Origin | Type |
|---|---|---|
| Bofors QF 40 mm Mark I | Sweden | Light AAA |
| QF 3.7-inch AA gun | Britain | Heavy AAA |
| QF 4.5-inch naval gun | Britain | Heavy AAA/Coastal Gun |

The RMA used a range of UK/US manufactured support vehicles as general duties and logistics support. They also manned a range of searchlight and target acquisition systems associated with the anti-aircraft artillery.

== See also ==
- The King's Own Malta Regiment
- Siege of Malta (World War II)
- Fortifications of Malta
- Malta Dockyard
- Sliema Point Battery
- Fort Ricasoli
- Fort Campbell (Malta)
- Pembroke Battery
- Fort Pembroke
