= Duthie =

Duthie is a surname. Notable people with the surname include:

- Alan Stewart Duthie (1938–2013), Scottish linguist and academic in Ghana
- Augusta Vera Duthie (1881–1963), South-African botanist whose standard author abbreviation is A.V.Duthie
- Conner Duthie (born 1997), Scottish footballer
- Gil Duthie (1912–1998), Australian politician
- James Duthie (disambiguation)
- John Duthie (disambiguation)
  - John Firminger Duthie, English botanist whose standard author abbreviation is Duthie
- William Duthie (disambiguation)
