= Duthil (surname) =

Duthil is a surname. Notable people with the surname include:

- Robert Duthil (1899–1967), French pole vaulter
- Rudy Duthil (born 1982), American advertising executive

== See also ==
- Duthie
