= Ronald Senior =

British Army officer

Brigadier Ronald Senior DSO & Bar TD
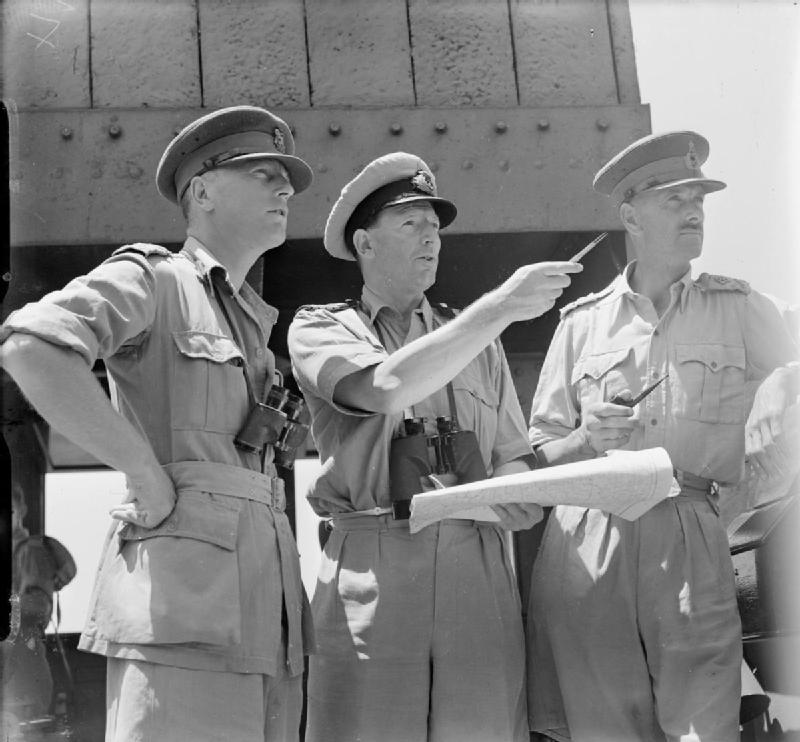
- Brigadier R. H. Senior, Captain P. S. Smith and Major-General Sidney Kirkman watching the invasion of Sicily from the troop transport Winchester Castle, July 1943
- Born: 3 July 1904; Chelsea, London
- Died: 2 March 1988 (aged 83); Westminster, London
- Military career
- Allegiance: United Kingdom
- Branch: British Army
- Service years: 1924–1946
- Rank: Brigadier
- Service number: 28534
- Commands: 56th Infantry Brigade (1945); 151st Infantry Brigade (1943–1944); 1st/7th Battalion, Queen's Royal Regiment (West Surrey) (1942–1943); 5th Battalion, Queen's Own Royal West Kent Regiment (1942)
- Conflicts: Second World War: Battle of France; Battle of Dunkirk; Western Desert campaign; Battle of Alam el Halfa; Second Battle of El Alamein; Tunisian campaign; Italian campaign; Allied invasion of Sicily; Western Front; Operation Overlord; Liberation of Arnhem
- Awards: Distinguished Service Order & Bar; Territorial Decoration; Mentioned in Despatches

Brigadier Ronald Henry Senior, DSO & Bar, TD (3 July 1904 – 2 March 1988) was a British Army officer who served with distinction in various campaigns throughout the Second World War.

== Military career ==
Ronald Henry Senior was born in Chelsea, London, on 3 July 1904. He was the son Lawrence Henry Senior and his wife, Emmadonna Shuttleworth Holden. He received his initial education at Cheltenham College and was commissioned into a Territorial Army (TA) unit, the 24th (County of London) Battalion (The Queen's) of the London Regiment, in April 1924. Senior was promoted to major in December 1934.

In the late 1930s the London Regiment was disbanded and Senior's battalion became the 7th (Southwark) Battalion of the Queen's Royal Regiment (West Surrey) and, in early 1938, he was made the second-in-command of the battalion. In 1939, the TA was ordered to be doubled in size, due to the possibility of another war with Germany, and Senior's battalion was split in two due to the number of new recruits joining up, his being designated the 1/7th and the new battalion the 2/7th. The Second World War broke out in September 1939.

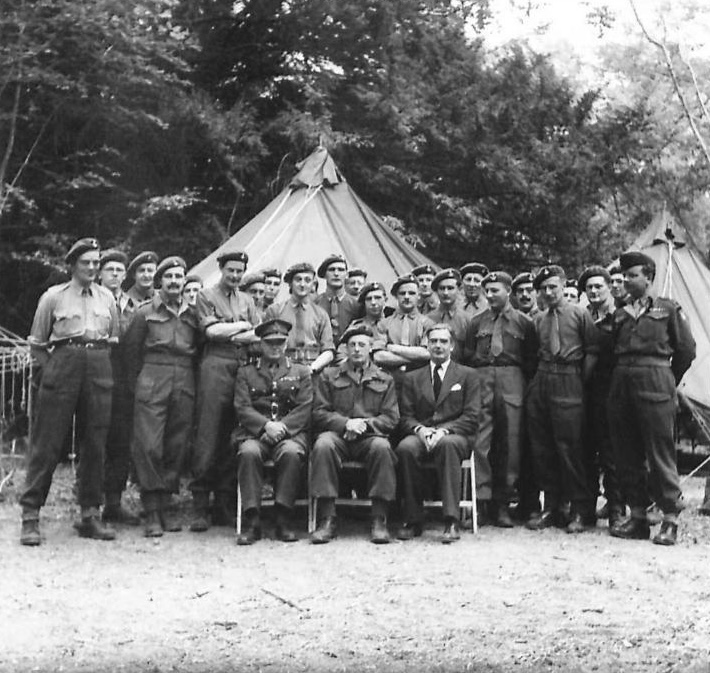
Foreign Secretary Anthony Eden and Lieutenant General William Morgan pose with Brigadier Senior and the staff of the 151st Infantry Brigade on 29 May 1944.

In April 1940 Senior, who was by now officer commanding D Company, was sent to France with his battalion to reinforce the British Expeditionary Force (BEF). As part of the 131st Infantry Brigade of the 44th (Home Counties) Division, the battalion was not to stay in France long as the Battle of France began just a few weeks later, which resulted in the BEF being almost surrounded by the superior German Wehrmacht forces and the BEF having to retreat to the port of Dunkirk, from where they were evacuated to England. For his services during the relatively brief campaign in France and Belgium, Senior was awarded the Distinguished Service Order (DSO) and was later mentioned in despatches.

Senior was later to command the 5th Battalion of the Queen's Own Royal West Kent Regiment from May–October 1942, seeing action at the Battle of Alam el Halfa, before returning to the 1/7th Battalion of the Queen's, this time in command, during the Second Battle of El Alamein. He led the battalion, which by now was part of the 7th Armoured Division, throughout the final stages of the Western Desert campaign and in the Tunisian campaign, until early 1943 when he was promoted to brigadier and assumed command of the 50th Division's 151st Infantry Brigade from Brigadier Daniel Beak. The brigade had also seen service in Africa and soon fought in the Allied invasion of Sicily from July–August 1943, and was eventually returned to the United Kingdom towards the end of 1943.

Senior and his brigade next fought in the Normandy landings and the subsequent battle of Normandy which followed. Senior was wounded in action soon after, however, and he spent the next few months recovering from his injuries before taking command of the 49th Division's 56th Infantry Brigade in late January 1945. One of his three battalion commanders was Robert Bray, who would become a four star general. Senior was to lead the 56th during the rest of the war, most notably during the liberation of Arnhem in April. The end of World War II in Europe followed soon afterward.
