= Operation Perch =

British offensive of the Second World War

- Part of the Battle for Caen
- Centaur IV tank of the Royal Marines Armoured Support Group near Tilly-sur-Seulles
Date	7–14 June 1944
Location	Normandy, France 49.08°N 0.66°W
Result	German victory

Belligerents
United Kingdom	Germany

Commanders and leaders
(United Kingdom) Bernard Montgomery (United Kingdom) Miles C. Dempsey (United Kingdom) Gerard Bucknall	(Germany) Leo Geyr von Schweppenburg (Germany) Sepp Dietrich

Strength
1 armoured division 2 infantry divisions 2 armoured brigades	3 panzer divisions 1 infantry division 1 heavy tank battalion
- Villers-Bocage, a commune in the Calvados department of the Normandy region of Northern France.

Operation Perch was a British offensive of the Second World War which took place from 7 to 14 June 1944, during the early stages of the Battle of Normandy. The operation was intended to encircle and seize the German occupied city of Caen, which was a D-Day objective for the British 3rd Infantry Division in the early phases of Operation Overlord. Operation Perch was to begin immediately after the British beach landings with an advance to the south-east of Caen by XXX Corps. Three days after the invasion the city was still in German hands and the operation was amended. The operation was expanded to include I Corps for a pincer attack on Caen.

On the next day, XXX Corps in the west pushed south to Tilly-sur-Seulles, which was occupied by the Panzer-Lehr Division; the village was captured and re-captured several times. I Corps began the eastern thrust two days later from the Orne bridgehead, which had been secured in Operation Tonga on D-Day. I Corps was also delayed by constant counter-attacks of the 21st Panzer Division. With mounting casualties and no sign of a German collapse, the offensive east of Caen was suspended on 13 June.

Further west in the US First Army area, American attacks forced a gap in the German defences. Part of the 7th Armoured Division was diverted from Tilly-sur-Seulles, to advance through the gap in a flanking manoeuvre and force the Panzer Lehr Division to fall back, to avoid encirclement. On 14 June, after two days of battle including the Battle of Villers-Bocage, the 7th Armoured Division was ordered to withdraw towards Caumont. Plans were made to resume the offensive once the 7th Armoured Division had been reinforced but the plans came to nothing when a storm in the English Channel seriously delayed the landing of supplies and reinforcements.

The battle is controversial because many historians and writers have concluded that it was failures by British divisional and corps commanders that squandered an opportunity to capture Caen, rather than the Germans achieving a defensive success. To resist the offensive, the Germans had committed their most powerful armoured reserves, which deprived them of the fighting power for a counter-offensive and forfeited the initiative to the Allies.

== Background ==
=== Operation Overlord ===
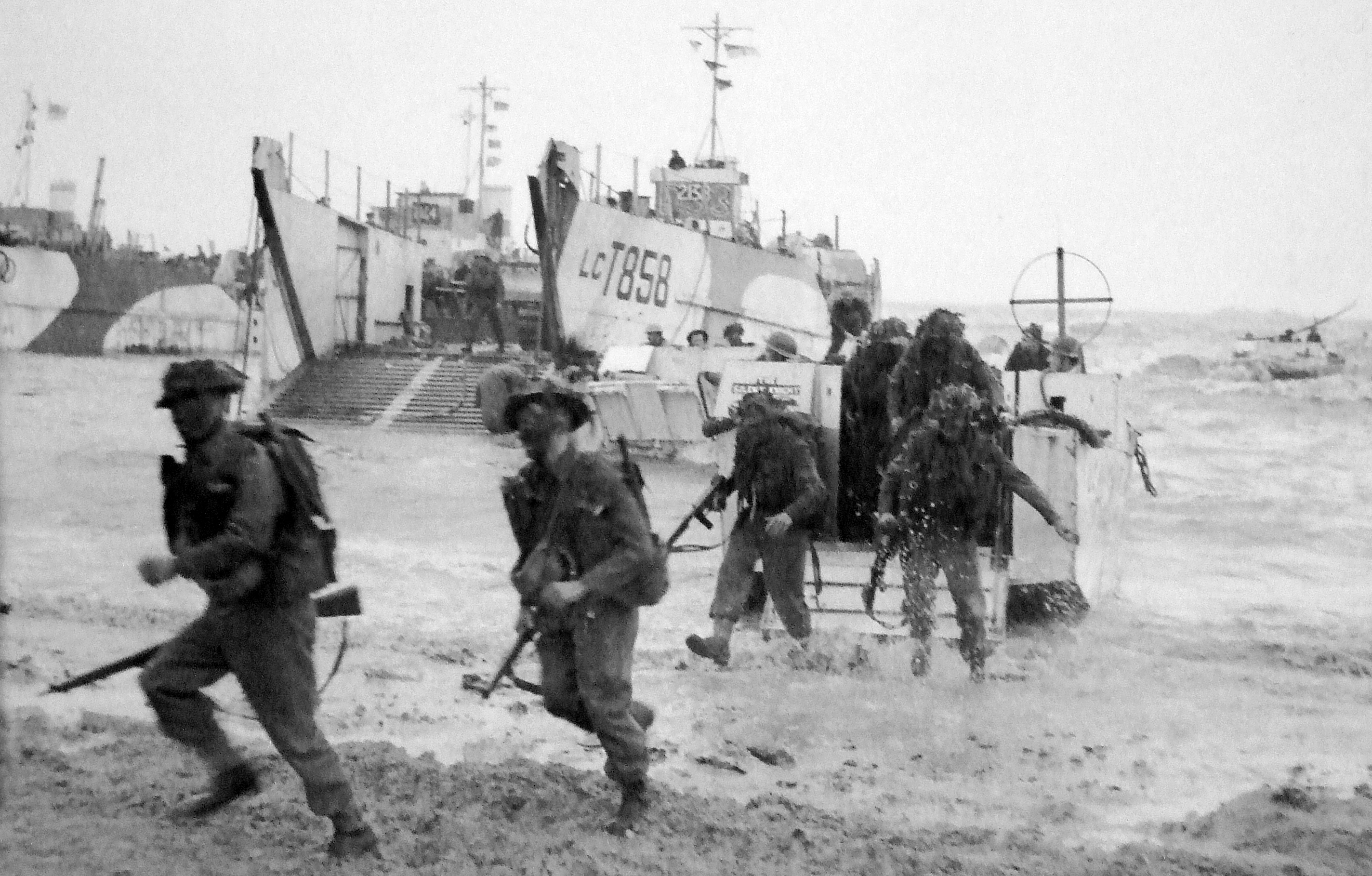
Infantry of the 50th (Northumbrian) Infantry Division run ashore near La Riviere on 6 June.

The Norman town of Caen was a D-Day objective for the 3rd Infantry Division, which landed on Sword Beach on 6 June 1944. The capture of Caen was the most ambitious objective of I Corps (Lieutenant-General John Crocker). (Note: "The quick capture of that key city [Caen] and the neighbourhood of Carpiquet was the most ambitious, the most difficult and the most important task of Crocker's I Corps". Chester Wilmot wrote that "The objectives given to Crocker's seaborne divisions were decidedly ambitious, since his troops were to land last, on the most exposed beaches, with the farthest to go, against what was potentially the greatest opposition.". Dempsey always considered the possibility that the immediate seizure of Caen might fail.) The Overlord plan called for the Second Army (Lieutenant-General Miles Dempsey) to secure the city and then form a front line from Caumont-l'Éventé to the south-east of Caen, acquiring airfields and protecting the left flank of the US First Army while it moved on Cherbourg. Possession of Caen and its surroundings would give the Second Army a suitable staging area for a push south to capture Falaise, which could be used as the pivot for a swing left of the Allied front to advance on Argentan and then towards the Touques River. The terrain between Caen and Vimont was especially promising, being open, dry and conducive to swift offensive operations. The Allies greatly outnumbered the Germans in tanks and mobile units and a battle of manoeuvre would be to their advantage.

=== Operation Perch ===
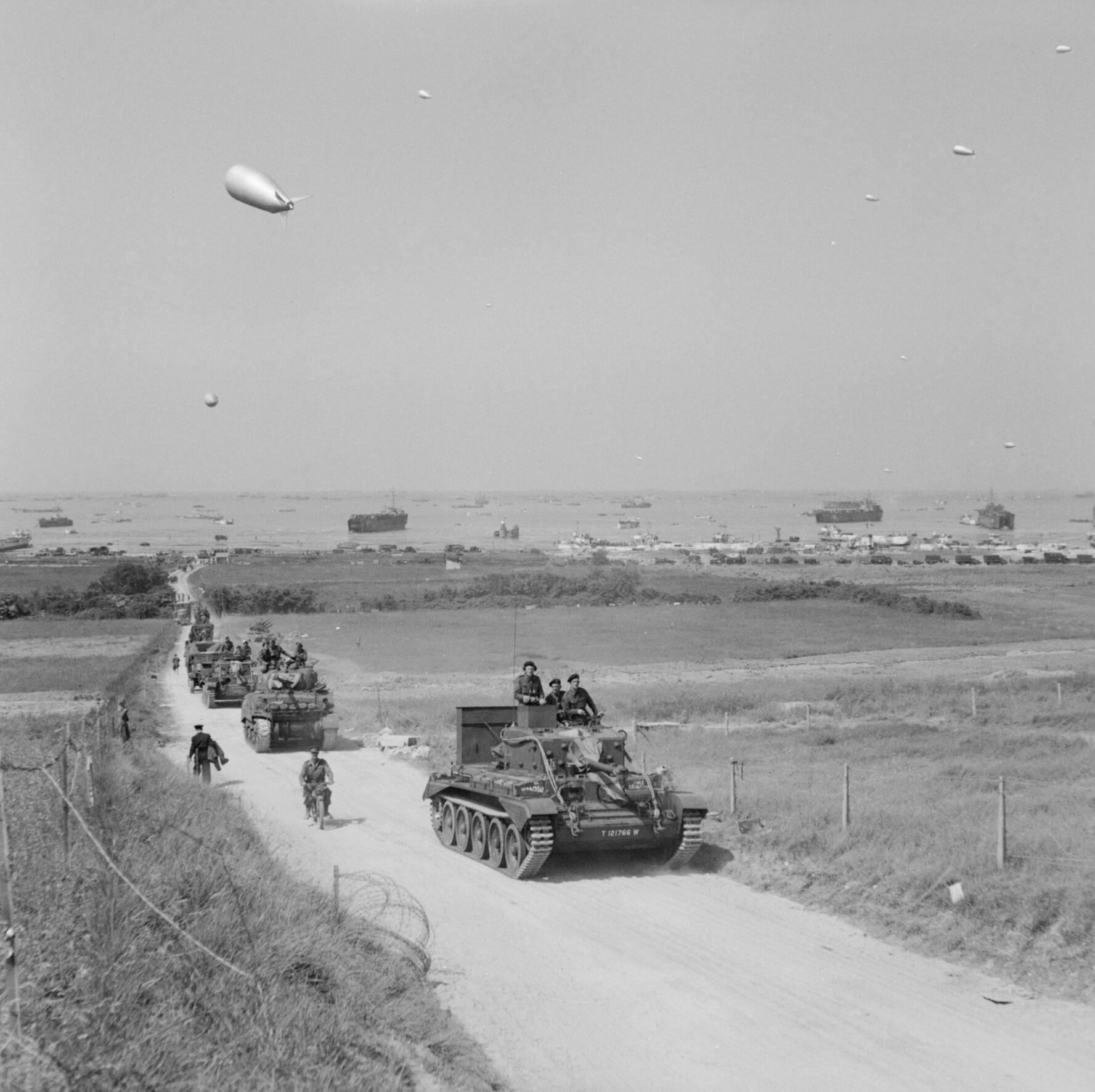
Tanks from the 4th County of London Yeomanry, 7th Armoured Division, move inland from Gold Beach, 7 June 1944.

Operation Perch was intended to create the threat of a British break-out to the south-east of Caen by XXX Corps. The 50th (Northumbrian) Infantry Division landed on Gold Beach on 6 June and was to rapidly move inland and capture Bayeux and the road to Tilly-sur-Seulles. The 7th Armoured Division and the 8th Armoured Brigade would then take over from the 50th Northumbrian Division and advance from Tilly-sur-Seulles to Mont Pinçon. XXX Corps landed on Gold Beach at 07:30 on 6 June, cleared seven exits off the beach and advanced 5 mi (8.0 km) inland. German resistance at Le Hamel delayed the division and prevented the achievement of all of the D-Day objectives before dark. Patrols had reached Bayeux and made contact with the 3rd Canadian Infantry Division, which had landed on Juno Beach to the east. The 47 Royal Marine Commando advanced westwards along the coast, to link up with the American forces moving inland from Omaha Beach but fell short of Port-en-Bessin-Huppain by 3 mi (4.8 km).

During the afternoon, the German LXXXIV Corps ordered its reserve, 12th SS Panzer Division Hitlerjugend (Kampfgruppe Meyer), to strike into the flank of the 50th Division north of Bayeux. While advancing to the attack, a battalion was ordered towards Omaha beach, weakening the counter-attack which was a costly failure. On 7 June, the bulk of the 7th Armoured Division landed on schedule and XXX Corps secured its remaining D-Day objectives, including Bayeux and Port-en-Bessin-Huppain. The German LXXXIV Corps sent its last reserve unit, Mobile Brigade 30, towards Gold Beach to repeat the counter-attack, which also failed and the brigade was destroyed north of Bayeux. The survivors of the two counter-attacks were driven into a pocket north of the city by the Anglo-American advance, although the Americans did not discover that this had happened. From Sword Beach, the 3rd Infantry Division of I Corps had advanced towards Caen but diverted units to capture German positions along the 9.3 mi (15.0 km) route, which reduced the strength of the infantry attack and the accompanying 27th Armoured Brigade was delayed by congestion in the beachhead. The division was stopped short of Caen by the 21st Panzer Division.

== Prelude ==
=== Operation Wild Oats ===
Area west of Caen

On 9 June the Allied ground forces commander, General Bernard Montgomery, met Dempsey and Omar Bradley (US First Army commander) and it was decided that Caen would be taken by a pincer movement, Operation Wild Oats. From the east the 51st (Highland) Infantry Division and the 4th Armoured Brigade of I Corps, would cross east into the 6th Airborne Division bridgehead over the Orne and attack towards Cagny, 6 mi (9.7 km) to the south-east of Caen. XXX Corps to the west would send the 7th Armoured Division across the Odon River to take Évrecy and Hill 112. The 1st Airborne Division would then drop between the pincers but Air Chief Marshal Sir Trafford Leigh-Mallory, the Allied air commander exercised a veto of the airborne plan as too risky for the transport aircraft.

=== German preparations ===
Late on 7 June, the I SS-Panzer Corps was transferred from the command of the 7th Army to Panzergruppe West (Armoured Group West, General Geyr von Schweppenburg). Field Marshal Gerd von Rundstedt, the supreme commander in the west (OB West), ordered Panzergruppe West to plan a counter-attack for 10 June. This attack was cancelled by Field Marshal Erwin Rommel the commander of Army Group B, due to lack of troops. German units were rushed to Normandy to contain the invasion. The I SS-Panzer Corps consisted of the Panzer-Lehr-Division, one of the strongest divisions in the German army, the 12th SS-Panzer Division Hitlerjugend and the 21st Panzer Division. (Note: The Panzer-Lehr-Division contained 237 tanks and assault guns as well as 658 half-tracks, double the number of other panzer divisions.) The leading elements of the Panzer-Lehr Division arrived during the night of 9 June at Tilly-sur-Seulles, having lost up to 200 vehicles to aerial attacks during its 90 mi (140 km) drive from Chartres, having been diverted from facing the British I Corps north of Caen due to the success of the 50th Northumbrian Division. (Note: Max Hastings, quoting a post-war interview of Fritz Bayerlein, the Panzer-Lehr-Division commander, gives losses of 130 trucks, five tanks and 84 self-propelled guns and other vehicles from an establishment of over 3,000 vehicles. Niklas Zetterling called these losses an exaggeration, Panzer-Lehr records show the loss of 23 Panthers, 19 Pz IV and 2 StuG to 26 June. Frederick Steinhardt wrote that Bayerlein's numbers were "probably in excess of reality".) Parts of the 12th SS-Panzer Division, the 21st Panzer Division and the remains of the 716th Static Infantry Division were moved to Caen, facing I Corps. Several attacks were launched against the Anglo-Canadian beachhead north of Caen. In the early hours of 9 June, the survivors of Kampfgruppe Meyer and Mobile Brigade 30 broke out of the pocket north of Bayeux. Later in the day, XXX Corps linked with the Americans while the 50th (Northumbrian) Infantry Division reached the north-east outskirts of Tilly-sur-Seulles and encountered the tanks of the Panzer-Lehr Division. During the evening, Panzer-Lehr and the 12th SS-Panzer Division counter-attacked and overran a British infantry company, before being forced back the next morning.

== Battle ==
=== XXX Corps ===
On 10 June, the 7th Armoured Division took over parts of the 50th Northumbrian Division front with the 56th Infantry Brigade under command. By nightfall, the 7th Armoured Division had reached the north-western fringe of Tilly-sur-Seulles and next day penetrated the village, capturing the central crossroads. The Panzer-Lehr Division made several counter-attacks, which forced the British out and attacks by the 50th (Northumbrian) Division bogged down in the bocage. Army Group B planned to relieve the armoured divisions facing the Second Army from 11 June and replace them with infantry divisions, to concentrate the tanks in the Carentan area and avert the danger to Cherbourg. Adolf Hitler over-ruled Rommel and the next day ordered him not to retreat and instead to roll up the Allied beachhead from east to west, starting with the Orne bridgehead.

=== I Corps ===
While XXX Corps attacked Tilly-sur-Seulles, an attack by I Corps was postponed until 12 June, because of weather delays, which slowed the landing of the 51st (Highland) Infantry Division and the 4th Armoured Brigade. On 10 June, German tanks and infantry made several attacks on the 6th Airborne Division in the Orne bridgehead, which forestalled the British attack. The Germans were repulsed with the help of naval gunfire and then counter-attacked; a captured German officer remarked that his "battalion had been virtually wiped out" during twelve hours of fighting. In the evening, a German attack on Ranville was repulsed with many German casualties. The vanguard of the 51st Highland Division arrived during the evening and attacked Bréville at dawn, which was also a costly failure; other elements of the division quickly secured Touffréville. During the afternoon of 11 June, The Queen's Own Rifles of Canada and 1st Hussars attacked Le Mesnil-Patry to assist the advance of the 69th Brigade of the 50th Northumbrian Division but the attack was another costly failure. On 12 June, German attacks were launched from the Bréville area against the Orne bridgehead. Fighting lasted all day and casualties were severe on both sides but during the evening the Germans pulled back. To close the gap in the British perimeter, the decision was made to secure Bréville and the 12th Battalion the Parachute Regiment captured the village by midnight but had 141 casualties among 160 men in the attack. The 51st Highland Division was opposed by the 21st Panzer Division in its efforts to push south to Saint Honorine and with the Highlanders contained, the offensive east of Caen was called off on 13 June.

=== Caumont Gap ===
Allied and Axis dispositions on 12 June 1944

Although the attempt to envelop Caen had been repulsed, on the right flank of XXX Corps (the junction of the British Second and First US armies) the possibility for a flanking manoeuvre had developed. Since D-Day, the British and Americans had destroyed five German battle groups in this area, including the reserves of LXXXIV Corps, leaving only remnants of the 352nd Infantry Division in the Trévières–Agy sector. The 352nd Division had been in action since its defence of Omaha, on 6 June, and had received few replacements. The 1st US Infantry Division and the 2nd US Infantry Division had forced the collapse of the left flank of the 352nd Division. On the night of 9/10 June, the 352nd Division received permission to retire to Saint-Lô, which created a 7.5 mi (12.1 km) gap in the German lines near Caumont-l'Éventé. Only the reconnaissance battalion of the 17th SS-Panzergrenadier Division, which had been detached when the division was moved west ready for a counter-offensive at Carentan, remained in the area.

The Germans planned to use the 2nd Panzer Division to plug the gap but on 10 June, the bulk of the 2nd Panzer Division was strung out between Amiens and Alençon and was not expected to arrive in strength for another three days. (Note: Michael Reynolds wrote that the 3rd Parachute Division was sent to close the gap but Gordon Harrison wrote that the 2nd Parachute Corps was diverted to the Carentan sector.) General Hans Freiherr von Funck of XLVII Panzer Corps rushed the divisional reconnaissance battalion to Caumont, with orders to hold the high ground. The I SS-Panzer Corps commander, Sepp Dietrich, ordered his only reserve Schwere SS-Panzerabteilung 101, to move behind the Panzer-Lehr and 12th SS-Panzer divisions to cover the open left flank. The 2nd Company, schwere SS-Panzer Battalion 101, under the command of Michael Wittmann and with five operational Tiger tanks, was ordered to a position south of Point 213 on the Villers-Bocage ridge and arrived on 12 June, after a five-day drive from Beauvais.

During the night of 9/10 June, the German 352nd Infantry Division retired towards Saint-Lô creating a wide gap in the German lines covered only by light forces. On 12 June, the British 7th Armoured Division passed through the gap, heading for Villers-Bocage and the ridge beyond, while the 1st and 2nd US Infantry Divisions attacked in support.

On 12 June, Dempsey met with Lieutenant-General Gerard Bucknall (XXX Corps) and Major-General George Erskine (7th Armoured Division) and ordered Erskine to disengage the division from the fighting around Tilly-sur-Seulles. The 7th Armoured Division was to exploit the gap to seize Villers-Bocage and advance behind the left flank of the Panzer-Lehr Division, to a ridge about 1.6 mi (2.6 km) east of the town. It was believed that the appearance of British tanks behind the Panzer-Lehr Division on high ground astride German supply-lines would compel the Panzer-Lehr Division to withdraw or be trapped. To support the flanking move of the 7th Armoured Division, the 50th (Northumbrian) Infantry Division was to continue its attack against the Panzer-Lehr Division around Tilly-sur-Seulles. The US V Corps would push forward at the same time, the 1st US Infantry Division to capture Caumont and the high ground nearby and the 2nd US Infantry Division to advance towards Saint-Lô.

The 7th Armoured Division was slow to redeploy and spent the morning of 12 June continuing the attack on Tilly-sur-Seulles, according to its original orders. At 12:00, Erskine ordered Brigadier Robert "Looney" Hinde (commander of the 22nd Armoured Brigade) to move through the gap at once. With the 131st Infantry Brigade ready for action, the 56th Infantry Brigade was returned to the control of the 50th Northumbrian Division. The 7th Armoured Division armoured reconnaissance regiment, the 8th King's Royal Irish Hussars, began to reconnoitre the route and the rest of the division departed from Trungy at around 16:00. Four hours later, the main body approached Livry after an unopposed advance of 12 mi (19 km), the last 6 mi (9.7 km) of which were through German-held territory.

North of Livry, the leading 8th Hussar Cromwell tanks were knocked out by an anti-tank gun of the Panzer-Lehr Division Escort Company; infantry and tanks were brought forward and cleared the position after two hours. (Note: Taylor wrote that the lead tank was destroyed and Forty wrote that two tanks were lost.) On reaching the vicinity of La Mulotiere, Hinde halted for the night, to disguise the objective of the advance. The Cromwells of the 8th Hussar and the 11th (Prince Albert's Own) Hussar (the XXX Corps armoured car regiment) reconnoitred the flanks. The 11th Hussars found no resistance on the right, linking with the 1st US Infantry Division near Caumont; on the left flank, the 8th Hussars located elements of the Panzer-Lehr Division just under 2 mi (3.2 km) away. (Note: Caumont was occupied by two companies of the 2nd Panzer Division reconnaissance battalion. The 1st US Infantry Division took part of the town on 12 June and the remainder the following day.)

=== Battle of Villers-Bocage ===
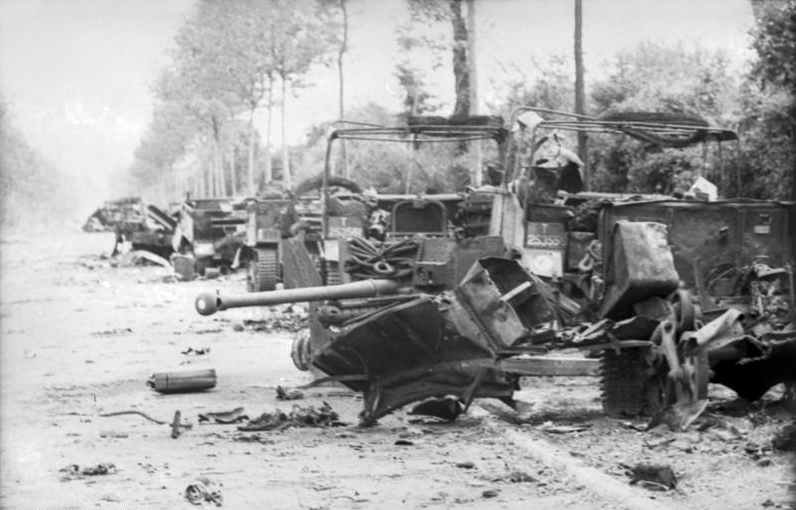
A 6 pdr anti-tank gun and Loyd Carriers knocked out by Michael Wittmann

The British advance resumed at 05:30, and at about 08:30 the vanguard of the 22nd Armoured Brigade group entered the west end of Villers-Bocage. (Note: The Brigade group consisted of the 1st Battalion, The Rifle Brigade, 1/5th Battalion, Queen's Royal Regiment (West Surrey), 1/7th Battalion, Queen's Royal Regiment (West Surrey), 4th County of London Yeomanry (Sharpshooters), 5th Royal Tank Regiment, 8th King's Royal Irish Hussars, 11th Hussars (Prince Albert's Own) and the 260th Anti-Tank Battery.) A squadron of the 4th County of London Yeomanry (Sharpshooters), moved through the town and occupied Point 213, an area of high ground to the east on the Caen road. The regimental headquarters and a company of infantry occupied the eastern end of the town along the main road.

At about 09:00, the foremost British tanks were engaged by 3–5 Tiger tanks of the 2nd Company, Schwere SS-Panzerabteilung 101. (Note: Daniel Taylor wrote that four Tigers engaged the British in the ambush, three tanks to the south of the road and one to the north.) A Tiger under the command of Michael Wittmann, entered Villers-Bocage and destroyed several tanks of the 4th County of London Yeomanry regimental headquarters and reconnaissance troop, then attacked British tanks entering the town from the west, before attempting to withdraw. The Tiger was immobilised by British return fire and was abandoned by the crew who fled towards Château Orbois to report to the Panzer-Lehr Division. In fewer than 15 minutes, 13–14 tanks, two anti-tank guns and 13–15 transport vehicles had been destroyed, many by Wittmann. During the rest of the morning, an infantry battalion from the 22nd Armoured Brigade group took up defensive positions in the town; the troops at Point 213 had been cut off and a force was assembled to extricate them. The relief force was unable to advance on the ridge and when more German forces arrived between 11:00 and 13:00, the trapped squadron surrendered. More German troops had arrived, and engaged the 22nd Armoured Brigade group along the road back to Livry.

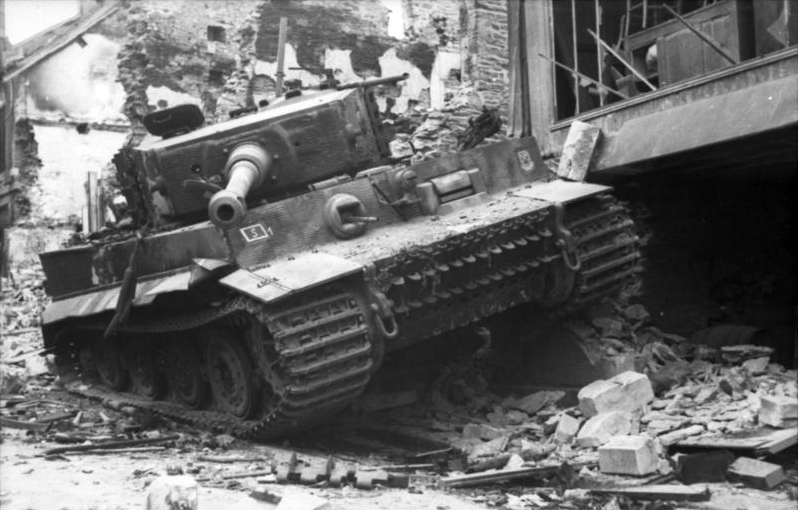
One of the Tiger tanks knocked out in Villers-Bocage.

Tanks of the Panzer-Lehr Division arrived to seal off the north and west exits from Villers-Bocage but were ambushed by British anti-tank guns and several were disabled before the British position was silenced. The Schwere SS-Panzerabteilung 101 was ambushed in the town centre. Several Tigers and a Panzer IV were knocked out by anti-tank guns, a Sherman Firefly and British infantry. The disabled tanks were later set on fire and British and German infantry fought throughout the afternoon. The British positions were bombarded by heavy artillery and several German attacks were repulsed by British field artillery firing over open sights. A British company was overrun, a platoon taken prisoner and the battalion headquarters came under fire. Hinde decided that the brigade group should withdraw until morning to Point 174, an area of high ground to the west of Villers-Bocage near Amayé-sur-Seulles. At 20:00, the withdrawal began under cover of an artillery bombardment and was accomplished largely unmolested.

=== 14 June ===
==== 50th (Northumbrian) Infantry Division ====
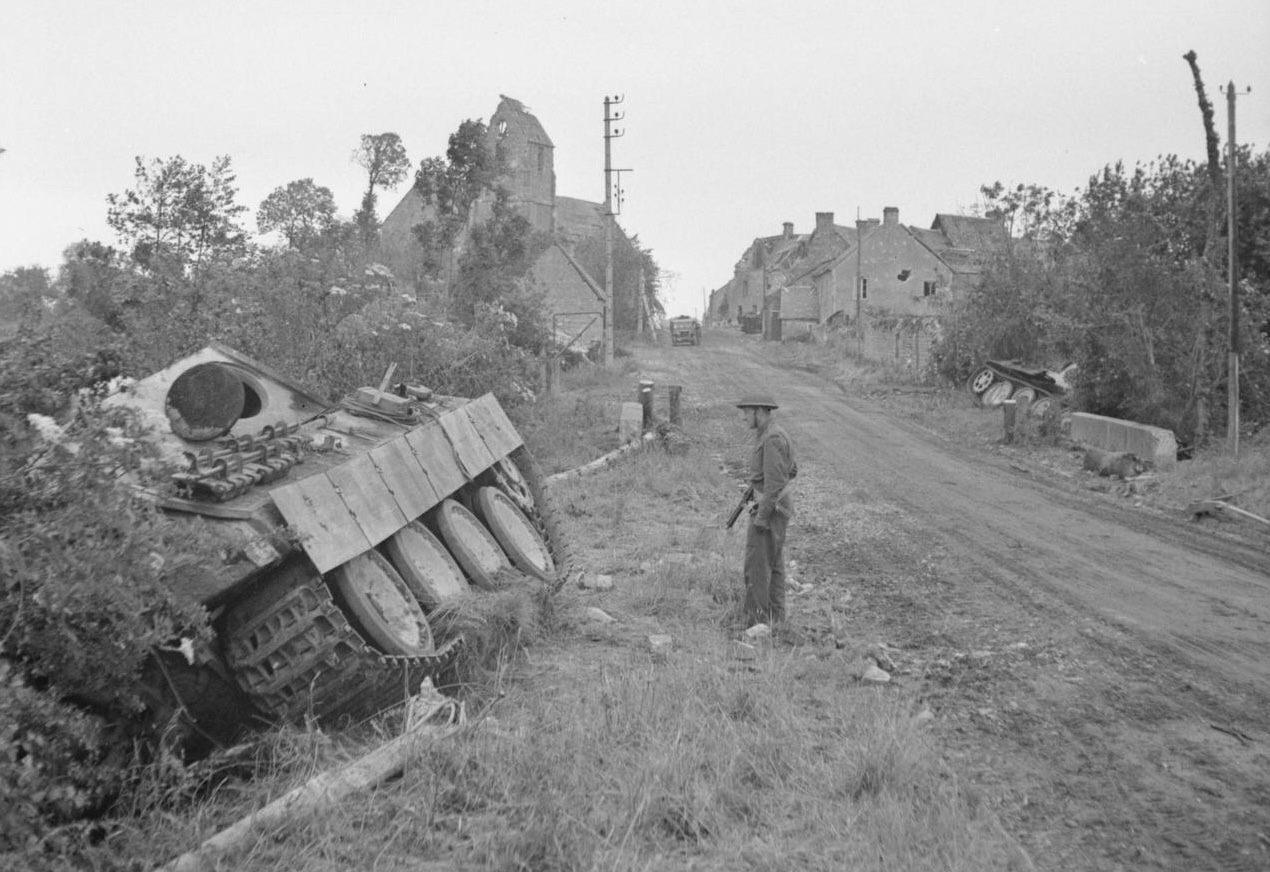
Two of the five Panther tanks knocked out by Sergeant Wilfred "Spit" Harris (commanding a Sherman Firefly) and Trooper Ian Mackillop (the tank gunner) are visible at the west end of Lingèvres, where the second attack was launched.

On the morning of 14 June, Montgomery abandoned the pincer attack on Caen, because he lacked "sufficient strength to act offensively on both flanks". XXX Corps was ordered to continue in a "concentrated single blow" while in the I Corps area, the attack by the 51st (Highland) Infantry Division was "piped down". The 50th (Northumbrian) Infantry Division continued the attack southwards, to pin down German forces. On 14 June, supported by the divisional artillery and the Royal Air Force, the division attacked with two brigades towards la Senaudière, la Belle Epine, Lingèvres and Verrières. If the attack succeeded, it was to be exploited to capture Hottot-les-Bagues. To prepare the route of the attack, a reconnaissance-in-force was conducted the evening before but the panzergrenadiers of the Panzer-Lehr Division inflicted many casualties on the British troops; German casualties are unknown, although one tank was destroyed.

The main attack began at 10:15 the next morning, when the 151st (Durham) Infantry Brigade and tanks of the 4th/7th Royal Dragoon Guards, advanced towards Lingèvres and Verrières. The German defenders held their fire until the British were less than 150 yd (140 m) from their position. The fighting culminated with an assault by the 6th Durham Light Infantry (DLI), with much artillery support, that captured the German positions. Two companies advanced to Verrières, which was found to be unoccupied but further advances were checked by German infantry and tanks. The 9th DLI was also held up by German machine-gun fire and needed their reserve companies, to break through the German positions. At about 13:30, the battalion captured Lingèvres and moved anti-tank guns into the village, although most of these were put out of action by the first German counter-attack.

Two Panthers were spotted approaching Lingèvres by Sergeant Wilfred Harris, commander of a Sherman Firefly, who engaged at 400 yd (370 m), destroying the first and disabling the second. While Harris moved, an infantry tank-hunting party, led by Major John Mogg (acting battalion commander of the 9th DLI) finished off the damaged Panther. Other tank-hunting parties drove off another Panther, a British M4 Sherman was destroyed and a third Panther was knocked out by a Sherman. Three more Panthers moved towards the village and Harris destroyed the lead vehicle outside the village and the other two inside, including one in the centre of Lingèvres. The 231st Infantry Brigade reached its objectives by nightfall and linked with the 151st Infantry Brigade. A 6th DLI officer said that the attack was the best one launched by the battalion during the campaign. Nine German tanks were knocked out during the day but the 50th (Northumbrian) Infantry Division had been unable to break through the Panzer-Lehr defences and the DLI suffered c. 353 casualties.

==== Battle of the Island ====
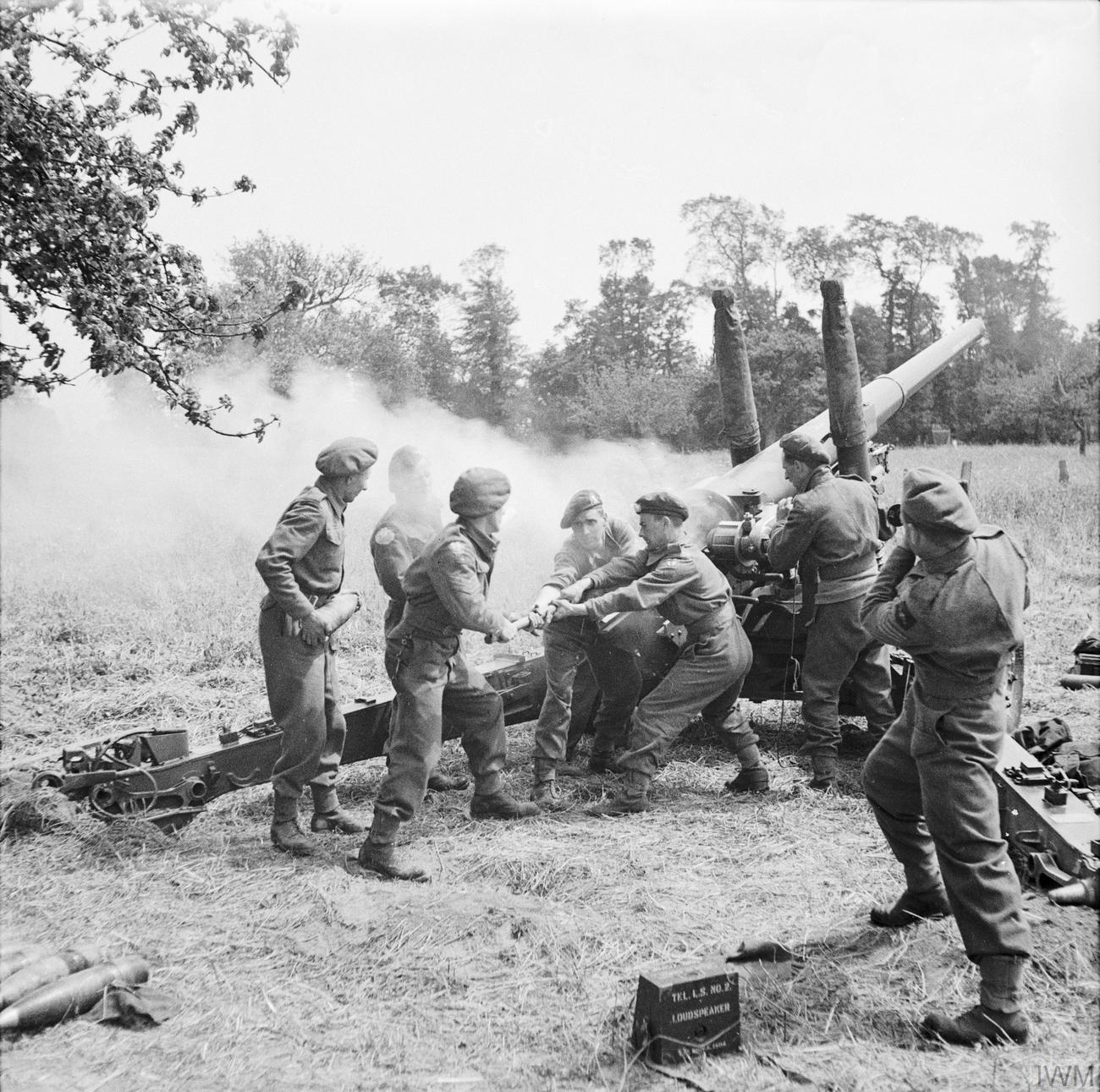
A 4.5 Inch Medium gun of the 64th Medium Regiment, RA, 5th AGRA. The 155 mm howitzers of US V Corps also fired in support during the battle.

The 22nd Armoured Brigade group had completed their withdrawal by 14 June and formed a brigade box for all-round defence [with an area of fewer than 0.77 sq mi (2 km^{2})] near Hill 174. (Note: Carlo D'Este wrote that the box was between Amayé-sur-Seulles and Tracy-Bocage, around Hill 174. Taylor put the brigade tactical headquarters on Hill 174 and included a map showing the brigade mostly to the south of Amayé-sur-Seulles as did Henri Marie. George Forty put the box north of Tracy-Bocage, near St-Germain, based on a report by the 22nd Armoured Brigade group commanding officer, that put the position east of Amayé-sur-Seulles and including St-Germain.) The fighting became known as the Battle of the Island or Island Position as named in the 22nd Armoured Brigade group after action report. Other names given to the action are the Battle of the Brigade Box and the Battle of Amayé-sur-Seulles.

The Panzer-Lehr Division had defended against the 50th (Northumbrian) Infantry Division attack and to counter-attack the 7th Armoured Division penetration, with the support of the 1st Company Schwere SS-Panzerabteilung 101. The 2nd Panzer Division reconnaissance battalion and other small infantry units also faced the brigade box but the tanks of the 2nd Panzer Division were en route. The British 131st Infantry Brigade (one infantry battalion and an armoured regiment) had moved up to Livry. During the morning, the 131st Infantry Brigade kept the road from the brigade box to the Livry–Briquessard area open and Typhoon fighter bombers attacked German positions near the box.

German infantry spotted advancing towards the brigade box were bombarded by heavy artillery and repulsed. Around 09:00, more infantry attacked the box and came too close for artillery fire. Hand-to-hand fighting began and a British platoon was overrun; a British counter-attack by infantry and tanks repulsed the German infantry and restored the position. The Germans resorted to harassing fire, sniping, mortar bombardments and heavy artillery fire. After a long artillery bombardment, simultaneous attacks from the north and south by tanks and infantry were made at 19:00, which broke into the box and closed on the brigade headquarters, before being driven back around 22:30.

==== Operation Aniseed ====
The 7th Armoured Division commander was confident that the box was secure but the failure of the 50th Northumbrian Infantry Division to break through the Panzer-Lehr Division and reach the 7th Armoured Division, led to orders for the brigade group to retire to straighten the front line. The retirement, codenamed Operation Aniseed, began just after midnight. Decoy raids by Bomber Command on Aunay-sur-Odon and Evrecy, caused 29 casualties, destroyed a Tiger tank and damaged three more. Artillery harassing fire was maintained north and south of the withdrawal route but the Germans did little to intervene. Germans losses included 700–800 casualties and 8–20 tanks, including several Tigers; British casualties were light and only three tanks were lost. Reynolds called the German casualty figures "exaggerated" and in his report, Hinde wrote "It is questionable whether the expenditure of artillery and small arms ammunition was justified by the scale of the enemy's efforts".

== Aftermath ==
=== Analysis ===
The failure of the operation led Dempsey to write that there was "no chance now of a snap operation with airborne troops either to seize Caen or to deepen the bridgehead on XXX Corps front. It is clear now that Caen can be taken only by set-piece assault and we do not have the men or ammunition for that at this time". After the war he wrote that the attack by the 7th Armoured Division should have succeeded and that his doubts about the suitability of Bucknall and Erskine increased. Dempsey called the handling of the battle a disgrace and said that the decision to withdraw from Villers-Bocage was made by the corps commander and Erskine. In 2004, Carlo D'Este called Dempsey's comments "excessively harsh" but historians generally support them, suggesting that a great opportunity swiftly to capture Caen had been squandered by Bucknall. John Buckley wrote in 2006 that Bucknall was not ready to support the attack once problems developed and that Erskine was not capable of mastering the situation. The British official historian, Lionel Ellis, wrote that the result was "disappointing" but that the fighting power of the Panzer-Lehr Division and with the unexpected arrival of the 2nd Panzer Division, the 7th Armoured Division "could hardly have achieved full success". In 2001, Michael Reynolds wrote that the 2nd Panzer Division tanks were nowhere near Villers-Bocage. Hubert Meyer wrote that Operation Perch failed because the 50th Northumbrian Division and its armoured brigade could not overcome the Panzer-Lehr-Division, the 51st (Highland) Infantry Division attack in the east end of the bridgehead failed and because of the rapid counter-attack by advanced elements of the 2nd Panzer Division.

The allocation of insufficient infantry to the attack has been criticised, because there were two infantry battalions and most of the 1st Battalion the Rifle Brigade available to the 7th Armoured Division on 13 June and three fresh infantry brigades in the bridgehead. Reynolds wrote that Bucknall was at fault for failing to concentrate his forces. D'Este concurred but Bucknall defended his decision claiming the "49 [Division] ... [had] no recent battle experience and it was important to launch them nicely into their first fighting in a properly coordinated battle, and not bundle them helter-skelter into hot armoured scrapping like that around V[illers]-B[ocage] and Amaye". Buckley wrote that the operation was a failure of command. Terry Copp wrote that Dempsey continued to underestimate the German strength and commitment to defending the ground they held. Mungo Melvin wrote that Dempsey and the Second Army handled subordinate formations poorly, by not giving subordinates definite tasks, clear intentions and allowing discretion in the implementation of orders.

Chester Wilmot called Operation Perch a strategic success, "By the premature commitment of his armour, Rommel had delayed the British advance, but in the process he had played into Montgomery's hands for, once the panzer divisions were locked into battle with Second Army, they could not be used for their proper offensive task". Stephen Badsey wrote that Montgomery's message to Bradley, "Caen is the key to Cherbourg" was true. The risk of a break-out past Caen immobilised the German armoured divisions at the east end of front, unable mount a counter-offensive against the First US Army. Hitler's interference saved Rommel's military reputation because the unsuitability of the Cotentin for armoured operations, the difficulties involved in movement and supply in the area and the strength of the Anglo-Canadian force, would have led to a more rapid and complete defeat of the German army in Normandy. By his order of 12 June, Hitler made the rest of the campaign a battle of attrition.

=== Casualties ===
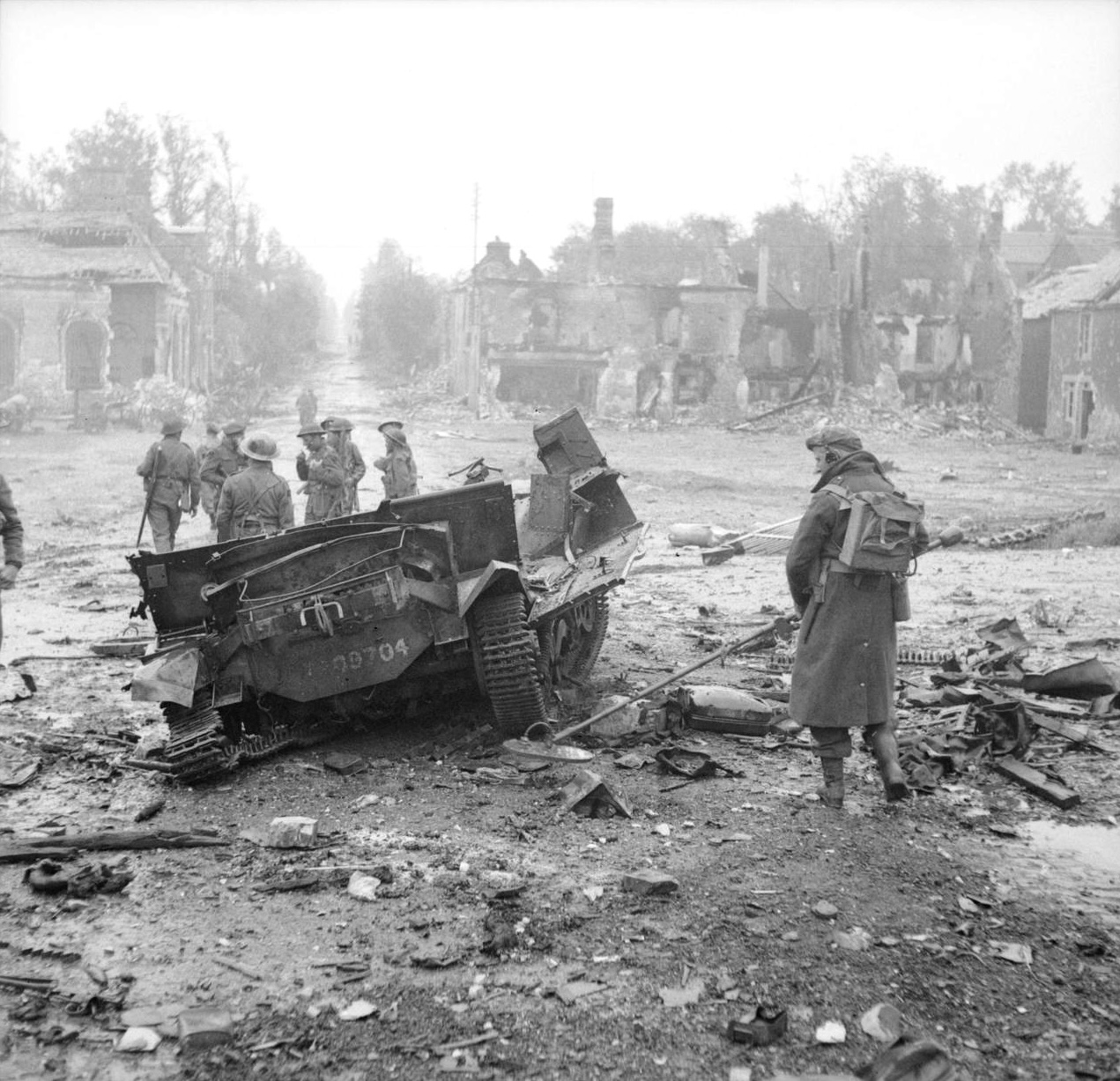
The remains of a Universal Carrier blown up by a mine in Tilly-sur-Seulles, 19 June 1944. The town "was one of the first of the many towns and villages which were well-nigh obliterated in the process of liberation".

During Operation Perch, Schwere SS-Panzerabteilung 101 suffered 27 casualties, had nine tanks destroyed and a further 21 damaged; leaving the battalion with only 15 operational tanks by 16 June. For most of the formations involved in the fighting, casualty data are unavailable. By the end of June, the Panzer-Lehr Division had suffered 2,972 casualties and reported the loss of 51 tanks and assault guns, 82 half tracks and 294 other vehicles. (Note: Panzer-Lehr casualties comprised 490 killed in action, 1,809 wounded and 673 missing. Tank losses included 19 Panzer IV, 23 Panthers and 2 StuG knocked out.) By 16 June, the 12th SS-Panzer Division had reported 1,417 casualties and by 26 June the division had lost 41 tanks. (Note: 12th SS-Panzer Division casualties comprised 405 killed in action, 847 wounded and 165 missing. Tank losses consisted of 26 Panzer IV and 15 Panthers.) By 16 June, the 21st Panzer Division had suffered 1,864 casualties; before the invasion, the division had 112 tanks and by 16 June the division reported 85 tanks operational. By the end of June, the 7th Armoured Division had suffered 1,149 casualties and lost at least 38 tanks during Operation Perch. By the end of the month, the 50th (Northumbrian) Infantry Division had suffered 4,476 casualties.

=== Battle honours ===
The British and Commonwealth system of battle honours recognised participation in the expansion of the bridgehead during the period of Operation Perch in 1956, 1957 and in 1958. One unit was awarded the honour Port En Bessin, one formation the honour Sully, four units the honour Breville, and 11 regiments the honour Villers-Bocage. Additionally, for participating in the expansion of the bridgehead between 14 and 19 June, ten units were awarded the honour Tilly Sur Seulles.

=== Subsequent operations ===
The battle between the 50th (Northumbrian) Division and the Panzer-Lehr Division continued for several days and by 15 June, XXX Corps claimed to have destroyed at least 70 German tanks. On 18 June, the British re-entered Tilly-sur-Seulles and consolidated the village next day against light opposition; it had changed hands 23 times. The British attacked towards Hottot-les-Bagues against the Panzer-Lehr Division and gained a foothold in the village, until forced out by German counter-attacks by tanks and infantry. The British retook the village and then withdrew during the night. The 7th Armoured Division was withdrawn to be reinforced by the 33rd Armoured Brigade, which was landing in the beachhead. The reinforced division was intended to attack again but on 19 June a storm began in the English Channel, which delayed the landing of supplies and British attacks were postponed. Caen north of the Orne was captured during Operation Charnwood (8–9 July) and the north bank suburbs were taken during Operation Atlantic (18–20 July).
