= William Morgan (British Army officer) =

British Army general (1891–1977)

General Sir William Morgan GCB DSO MC
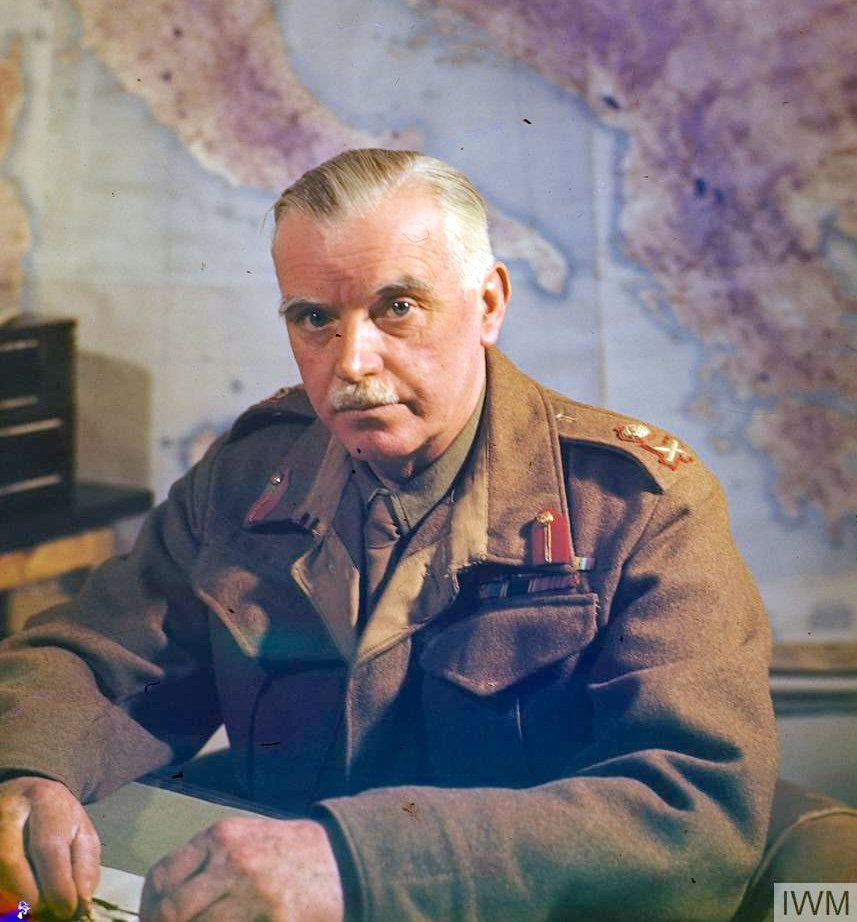
- Morgan in 1945
- Born: 15 December 1891; Edinburgh, Scotland
- Died: 13 May 1977 (aged 85); London, England
- Military career
- Allegiance: United Kingdom
- Branch: British Army
- Service years: 1913–1950
- Rank: General
- Nickname: "Monkey"
- Service number: 8038
- Units: Royal Field Artillery; Royal Artillery
- Commands: British Army Staff, Washington (1947–1950); Mediterranean Theater of Operations (1945–1947); Southern Command (1944–1945); 55th (West Lancashire) Infantry Division (1941); 10th Field Regiment, Royal Artillery (1939–1940)
- Conflicts: First World War; Second World War
- Awards: Knight Grand Cross of the Order of the Bath; Distinguished Service Order; Military Cross; Mentioned in Despatches (5); Croix de Guerre (Belgium)

General Sir William Duthie Morgan, GCB, DSO, MC (15 December 1891 – 13 May 1977) was a British Army officer. During the Second World War, he served as Chief of Staff to Field Marshal Harold Alexander, and later succeeded him as Supreme Allied Commander in the Mediterranean Theatre of Operations.

== Early life and military career ==
Born in Edinburgh, Scotland, Morgan was the son of Alexander Morgan and his wife Isobel Duthie. The family initially lived at 63 Warrender Park Road in the Marchmont district then moved to 1 Midmar Gardens in the south-west.

Morgan was educated at George Watson's College and the Royal Military Academy, Woolwich, from which he was commissioned a second lieutenant in the British Army's Royal Artillery in January 1913. He served in the First World War, winning the Distinguished Service Order at the Battle of Le Cateau in 1914 and later the Military Cross, and was mentioned in despatches four times throughout the war. The citation for his MC reads:

For conspicuous gallantry in action. As F[orward].O[bservation].O[fficer]. he maintained telephonic and visual communication under very heavy fire throughout the operations, thereby obtaining most valuable information.

He was awarded the Croix de Guerre by the King of Belgium in April 1918.

== Between the wars ==
During the interwar period, Morgan's postings included active service in Waziristan and a period as a General Staff Officer Grade 3 at the War Office. He attended the Staff College, Camberley from 1925 to 1926, where his fellow students included Ronald Scobie, Frank Messervy, Raymond Briggs, Eric Harrison, Henry Willcox, Francis Tuker, John Swayne and Ralph Deedes. He then served as a GSO3 at the War Office. In 1929 he was appointed military attaché at the British Embassy in Budapest, Hungary, where he remained until 1931. In 1933 he was posted as a major to the 19th Field Brigade, Royal Artillery in Bordon and in 1934 he became Chief Instructor at the Royal Military Academy, Woolwich.

== Second World War ==
In the Second World War, Morgan (nicknamed "Monkey") initially commanded the 10th Field Regiment, Royal Artillery with the British Expeditionary Force, before succeeding Richard McCreery as the General Staff Officer Grade 1 with the 1st Infantry Division in France. Back in the United Kingdom, he was appointed to the rank of temporary brigadier to be Brigadier General Staff of I Corps. Having had his permanent rank advanced to full colonel in May 1941 (with seniority back dated to 1939), he was appointed acting major general and appointed General officer commanding (GOC) of the 55th (West Lancashire) Infantry Division in June. In October 1941 he was injured, and was forced to relinquish this appointment and revert to the rank of colonel on full pay.

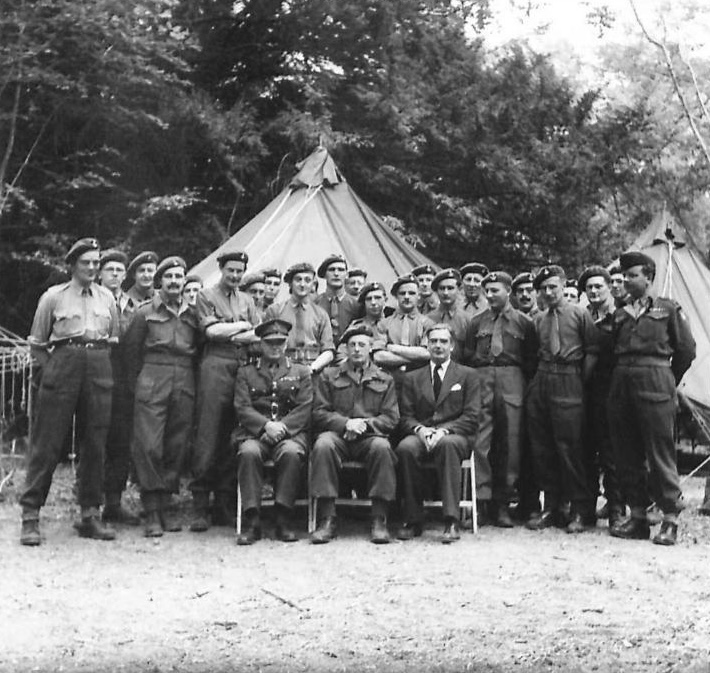
Foreign Secretary Anthony Eden and Lieutenant General William Morgan pose with Brigadier Ronald Senior and the staff of the 151st Infantry Brigade, 29 May 1944.

Returned to fitness, in September 1942 Morgan was appointed an acting lieutenant general to be Chief of the General Staff for Home Forces. When British land forces were reorganised in July 1943 to create the 21st Army Group, commanded by General Sir Bernard Paget, for the planned Allied invasion of northwest Europe the following year, Morgan became Chief of Staff of the new army group. His rank was upgraded to temporary lieutenant general in September 1943, and he was appointed a Companion of the Order of the Bath in the 1944 New Year Honours.

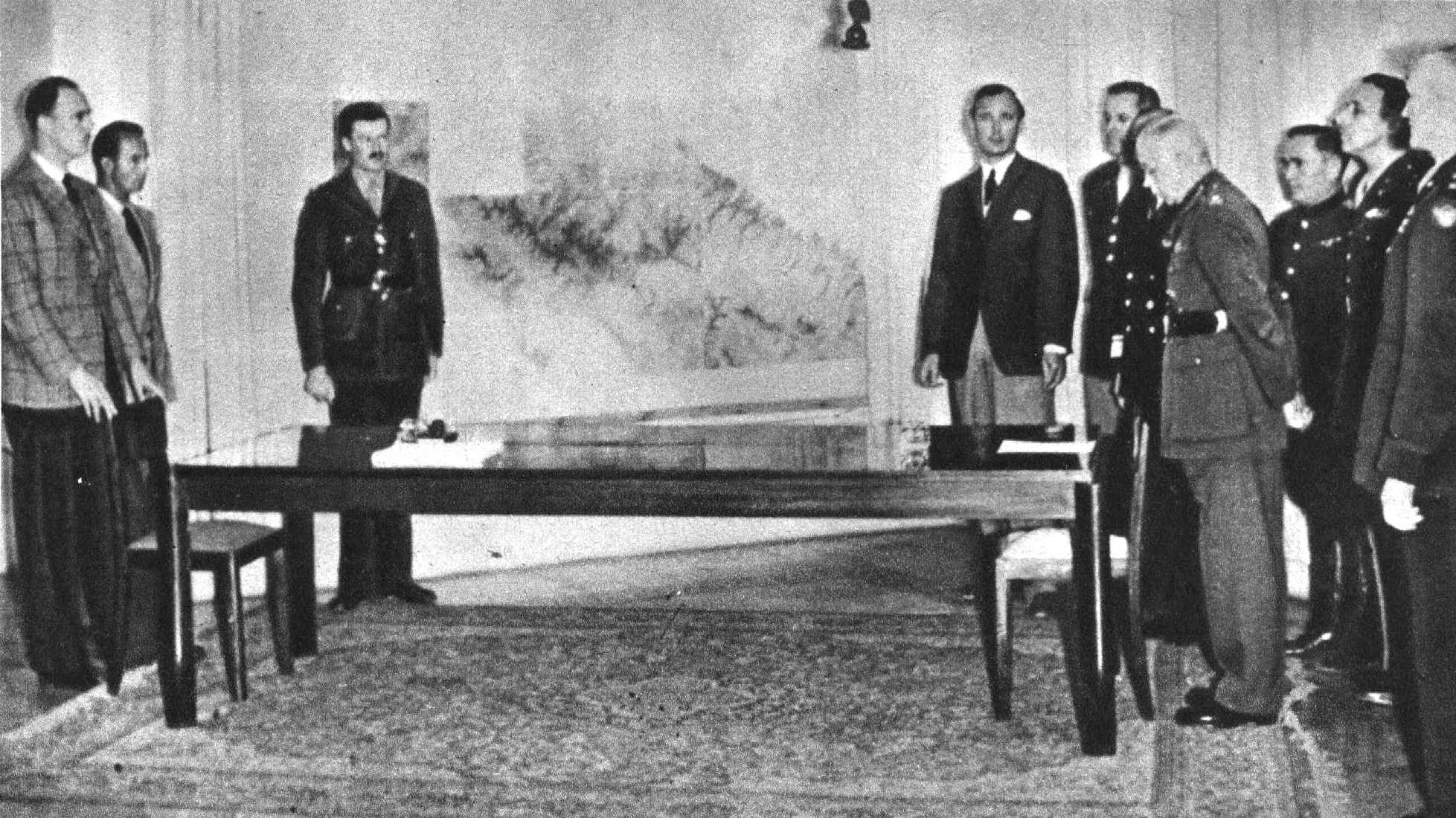
Surrender at Caserta on 29 April 1945 at the Caserta Royal Palace: gen. Morgan is near the table on the right, representing the allied nations.

In February 1944, Morgan was made General Officer Commanding-in-Chief for Southern Command. While still appointed a temporary lieutenant general, Morgan's permanent rank was advanced to major general in May 1944. In March 1945, he became Chief of Staff to the Supreme Allied Commander in the Mediterranean Theatre, Field Marshal Sir Harold Alexander. On 29 April 1945, he accepted the surrender of all Axis forces on the Italian Front with the surrender signed at Caserta. In September he was appointed Deputy Supreme Allied Commander for the Mediterranean Theatre and then in October succeeded Alexander as the Supreme Allied Commander. Also in October he was made a Knight Commander of the Order of the Bath. The Morgan Line, which at one time demarcated the boundary between Italy and Yugoslavia, was named after him.

== Postwar ==
In August 1946, after the war, Morgan's rank of lieutenant general was made permanent (with seniority backdated to the end of 1944) and in November 1946 was promoted to general.

In 1947 Morgan was made commander of the British Army Staff in Washington, D.C., and Army member of the British Joint Staff Mission to the United States. In this capacity Morgan was offered access to the atomic bomb by General Dwight D. Eisenhower as an incentive to persuade Britain to give up its own programme. His knighthood was advanced to Knight Grand Cross of the Order of the Bath in the 1949 New Year Honours, and he retired from the British Army in June 1950.

== Bibliography ==
- Jackson, General Sir William & Gleave, Group Captain T.P. (2004) [1st. pub. HMSO:1988]. Butler, Sir James (ed.). The Mediterranean and Middle East, Volume VI: Victory in the Mediterranean, Part 3 – November 1944 to May 1945. History of the Second World War, United Kingdom Military Series. Uckfield, UK: Naval & Military Press. ISBN 1-84574-072-6.
- Smart, Nick (2005). Biographical Dictionary of British Generals of the Second World War. Barnesley: Pen & Sword. ISBN 1844150496.

Military offices
Preceded by Vivian Majendie	GOC 55th (West Lancashire) Infantry Division; June – October 1941	Succeeded by Frederick Morgan
Preceded by Sir Charles Loyd	GOC-in-C Southern Command; 1944–1945	Succeeded by Sir Sidney Kirkman
