= Alexander Morgan (mathematician) =

Scottish mathematician (1860–1946)

Alexander Morgan PEIS FRSE OBE LLD (21 August 1860 – 17 March 1946) was a Scottish mathematician and educator. He was President of the Educational Institute of Scotland 1911/12. He was involved in the creation of the Education Act 1918.

== Life ==
He was born in Leith on 21 August 1860 the son of Ann and William Morgan originally from Aberdeenshire. The family returned to Aberdeen during his infancy and he was educated there at the North Parish School.

Returning to Edinburgh he initially studied for the ministry at the Church of Scotland Training College but then abandoned this and instead studied mathematics and natural philosophy (physics) at the University of Edinburgh graduating with an MA in 1886. On graduating he began lecturing in mathematics at the Church of Scotland Training College, becoming its Principal in 1903.

In 1896 he was elected a Fellow of the Royal Society of Edinburgh. His proposers were George Chrystal, Simon Somerville Laurie, John Sturgeon Mackay and Peter Guthrie Tait. He was President of the Edinburgh Mathematical Society 1898/99.

In later life in lived at 1 Midmar Gardens in south-west Edinburgh.

From 1920 to 1925 he was Director of Studies for the Provincial Training College.

He retired in 1925 and died in Edinburgh on 17 March 1946.

== Family ==
In 1888 he married Isobel Duthie (died 1941). They had two sons: General William Duthie Morgan and Alexander Morgan.
