= James Duthie =

James Duthie may refer to:

- James Duthie (field hockey) (born 1957), British former field hockey player
- James Duthie (sportscaster) (born 1966), Canadian sportscaster
- Jim Duthie (footballer) (1923–1972), Scottish footballer (Southend United)
- Jim Duthie (rugby union), English rugby union international
