= William Duthie (disambiguation) =

Sir William Duthie (1892–1980) was a British politician.

William Duthie may also refer to:

- William Duthie (author) (fl.1852–1870), English author and poet, friend of Dickens
- William Duthie (shipbuilder) (1824–1896), Scottish sea captain and shipbuilder

== See also ==
- William Duthie Morgan
