= Daniel Beak =

Recipient of the Victoria Cross

Major-General Daniel Beak VC DSO MC*
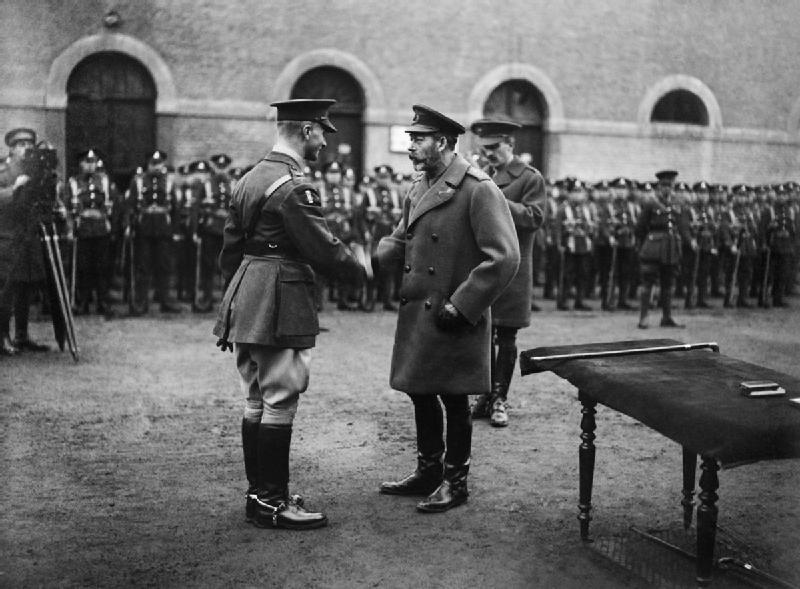
- King George V presents the VC to Commander Daniel Beak at Valenciennes, 6 December 1918.
- Born: 27 January 1891; South Stoneham, Southampton, Hampshire, England
- Died: 3 May 1967 (aged 76); Swindon, Wiltshire, England
- Burial place: Brookwood Cemetery
- Military career
- Allegiance: United Kingdom
- Branch: Royal Navy (1915–1919); British Army (1921–1945)
- Service years: 1915–1919; 1921–1945
- Rank: Major-General
- Service number: 15892
- Units: Royal Scots Fusiliers; King's Regiment (Liverpool); South Lancashire Regiment
- Commands: 151st Infantry Brigade (1942–1943); Malta Command (1942); 12th Infantry Brigade (1940–1941); 1st Battalion, South Lancashire Regiment (1938–1940); Drake Battalion (1918–1919); Howe Battalion (1917–1918)
- Conflicts: First World War: Western Front; Hundred Days Offensive; Second World War: North African campaign; Tunisian campaign; Battle of the Mareth Line
- Awards: Victoria Cross; Distinguished Service Order; Military Cross & Bar; Mentioned in Despatches (3)

Major-General Daniel Marcus William Beak, VC, DSO, MC & Bar (27 January 1891 – 3 May 1967) was a British Army officer and an English recipient of the Victoria Cross, the highest award for gallantry in the face of the enemy that can be awarded to British and Commonwealth forces.

== Early life ==
Beak was born in Southampton, Hampshire on 27 January 1891 and educated at Taunton's School.

== First World War ==
=== 1915–1917 ===
Beak joined the Royal Naval Volunteer Reserve as a rating on 2 February 1915, but before seeing action was commissioned as a temporary sub-lieutenant in the Royal Naval Division in May 1915. He was posted to the Mediterranean Expeditionary Force, but it is not clear from his service record if he saw action in that theatre. He arrived in France in May 1916, and after being appointed adjutant of Drake Battalion on 2 March 1917, he ended up commanding his battalion as an acting commander between 19 March 1917 and 3 April 1917. He was promoted to temporary lieutenant commander on relinquishing command, and attached to headquarters.

He was awarded the Military Cross (MC) in January 1917, and a Bar to his MC on 18 July 1917. The citations read:

His Majesty the KING has been graciously pleased to confer the Military Cross on the undermentioned Officers and Warrant Officers, in recognition of their gallantry and devotion to duty in the Field :—

[...]

Temp. Sub-Lt. Daniel Marcus William Beak, R.N.V.R.

For conspicuous gallantry in action. He led his men in the attack with great courage and initiative and materially assisted in the capture of the enemy line. He set a fine example throughout.

His Majesty the KING has been graciously pleased to award a Bar to the Military Cross to the undermentioned Officers:—

[...]

Temp. Sub. Lieut, (actg. Lieut.-Comdr.) Daniel Marcus William Beak, M.C., R.N.V.R.

For conspicuous gallantry during operations, when he continually dashed forward, under heavy fire, to reorganize the men, and led them on with great bravery through the enemy barrage and machine-gun fire.

He attended the Senior Officers' Course in Aldershot in late 1917 and on 31 December was promoted temporary commander, and appointed as commanding officer of the Howe Battalion.

=== 1918 ===
Beak remained in command of the Howe Battalion, then briefly commanded the Anson Battalion in the first week of March 1918, and then transferred back to the Drake Battalion on 13 March 1918. He was Mentioned in Despatches on 20 May, and awarded the Distinguished Service Order (DSO) on 26 July 1918, the citation read:

Awarded the Distinguished Service Order.

[...]

T./Comdr. Daniel Marcus William Beak, M.C., R.N.D., R.N.V.R.

For conspicuous gallantry and devotion to duty. During a night attack by the enemy the right flank of his division was left in a dangerous position. He arranged for a flank to be formed in that direction, and subsequently covered the retirement of two brigades with a composite rear-guard which he organised and commanded. His initiative and presence of mind greatly assisted in extricating these brigades from a very difficult situation. Throughout, the skilful handling of his battalion was particularly noticeable.

He was sick for four days with the flu in July 1918, and was granted a period of home leave in August, returning on 10 August. During the period 21/25 August and on 4 September 1918 at Logeast Wood, France, Commander Beak led his men and captured four enemy positions under heavy fire. Four days later, although dazed by a shell fragment, in the absence of the brigade commander, he reorganised the whole brigade under extremely heavy gun fire and led his men to their objective. When an attack was held up, accompanied by only one runner he succeeded in breaking up a nest of machine-guns, personally bringing in nine or ten prisoners. His initiative and the confidence with which he inspired all ranks, contributed very materially to the success of these operations. In recognition of his efforts, Beak was awarded the Victoria Cross. The full citation was published in a supplement to the London Gazette of 12 November 1918 (dated 15 November 1918):

War Office, 15th November, 1918.

His Majesty the KING has been graciously pleased to approve of the award of the Victoria Cross to the undermentioned Officers, Noncommissioned Officers and Men: —

[...]

T./Comdr. Daniel Marcus William Beak, D.S.O., M.C., R.N.V.R.

For most conspicuous bravery, courageous leadership and devotion to duty during a prolonged period of operations.

He led his men in attack, and, despite heavy machine-gun fire, four enemy positions were captured. His skilful and fearless leadership resulted in the complete success of this operation and enabled other battalions to reach-their objectives.

Four days later, though dazed by a shell fragment, in the absence of the brigade commander, he reorganised the whole brigade under extremely heavy gun fire and led his men with splendid courage to their objective.

An attack having been held up he rushed forward, accompanied by only one runner, and succeeded in breaking up a nest of machine guns, personally bringing back nine or ten prisoners. His fearless example instilled courage and confidence in his men, who then quickly resumed the advance under his leadership.

On a subsequent occasion he displayed great courage and powers of leadership in attack, and his initiative, coupled with the confidence with which he inspired all ranks, not only enabled his own and a neighbouring unit to advance, but contributed very materially to the success of the Naval Division in these operations.

He received a second Mention in Despatches on 20 December 1918. With the war now over he was granted several periods of home leave, returned home permanently in May 1919, and was demobilised in June.

== Inter-war service ==
In 1921, he was granted a regular army commission with the Royal Scots Fusiliers as a captain. Beak was in Ireland with his regiment during the Irish War of Independence. In the situation, following the collapse of the British civilian administration, his duties included membership of the Courts of Enquiry in lieu of Inquests. In July 1921 he is documented as a member of the enquiry into the shooting of Richard and Abraham Pearson by the South Offaly No. 2 Brigade IRA.

He was given a brevet promotion to major in 1929, and substantive promotion in 1932, on transfer to the King's Regiment (Liverpool). He was promoted brevet lieutenant colonel in 1935. The substantive promotion followed in 1938, transferring again, this time to the South Lancashire Regiment.

== Second World War ==
During the Second World War, Beak was initially the Commanding Officer of the 1st Battalion, South Lancashire Regiment which fought in the Battle of France. In June 1940 he was made commander of 12th Brigade, GOC Malta Command and 151st Infantry Brigade, part of the 50th (Northumbrian) Infantry Division, which he led during Operation Pugilist. General Sir Bernard Montgomery dismissed him from this post after that battle and he never held another command.

He was an acting brigadier by 2 August 1940 when his promotion to colonel was gazetted. A Mention in Despatches was gazetted on 20 December 1940, for services between March and June of that year. He was promoted temporary major general in January 1942. He retired from the army on 19 February 1945, retaining the honorary rank of major general.

His VC is on display in the Lord Ashcroft Gallery at the Imperial War Museum, London.

He is buried in an unmarked grave at Brookwood Cemetery in Surrey but in recognition of his close ties to Cheltenham, where he served as Acting Secretary of Cheltenham YMCA in 1913, they, together with This England magazine, erected a commemorative plaque by the main war memorial in the Promenade, which was dedicated by the Mayor of Cheltenham on 27 September 2006.

== Bibliography ==
- Smart, Nick (2005). Biographical Dictionary of British Generals of the Second World War. Barnesley: Pen & Sword. ISBN 1844150496.
- Gliddon, Gerald (2014) [2002]. Road to Victory 1918. VCs of the First World War. The History Press. ISBN 978-0750953610.

Military offices
Preceded by John Scobell	GOC Malta Command; January–July 1942	Succeeded by Ronald Scobie
