= 151st Infantry Brigade (United Kingdom) =

Infantry brigade of the British Army during World War 2

- Active: 1939–1946
- Country: United Kingdom
- Branch: British Army
- Type: Infantry
- Size: Brigade
- Part of: 50th (Northumbrian) Infantry Division
- Engagements: Battle of France (1940); Battle of Arras; Battle of Gazala; Second Battle of El Alamein; El Agheila; Operation Pugilist; Mareth Line; Wadi Akarit; D-Day; Operation Perch; Operation Market Garden

Commanders
- Notable commanders: Richard Sugden

The 151st Infantry Brigade was an infantry brigade of the British Army that saw active service during the Second World War in Belgium and France in 1940, and later in North Africa, Tunisia and Sicily, and later in Normandy in mid-1944 and North-western Europe. The brigade was part of the 50th (Northumbrian) Infantry Division, and for most of its wartime existence consisted of three battalions of the Durham Light Infantry (DLI) the 6th, 8th and 9th.

== History ==
=== Order of Battle ===
151st Infantry Brigade was constituted as follows during the war:

- 6th Battalion, Durham Light Infantry
- 8th Battalion, Durham Light Infantry
- 9th Battalion, Durham Light Infantry (until 30 November 1944)
- 151st Infantry Brigade Anti-Tank Company (formed 7 December 1939, disbanded 1 January 1941)
- 151st Infantry Brigade Special Company (from 7 July until 31 December 1943)
- 1/7th Battalion, Queen's Royal Regiment (West Surrey) (from 4 December 1944)

=== Commanders ===
The following officers commanded 151st Brigade during the war:

- Brigadier J. A. Churchill
- Brigadier H. Redman
- Lieutenant Colonel C. W. Beart (acting)
- Brigadier J. S. Nichols
- Lieutenant Colonel M. K. Jackson (acting)
- Lieutenant Colonel M. N. Dewing (acting)
- Brigadier J. E. S. Percy
- Brigadier D. M. W. Beak
- Brigadier R. H. Senior
- Lieutenant Colonel R. P. Lidwill (acting)
- Brigadier B. B. Walton
- Lieutenant Colonel R. P. Lidwill (acting)
- Brigadier D. S. Gordon
- Brigadier J. F. Walker

=== Battle of France ===
Arras counter-attack 21 May 1940

50th Division with the Brigade was deployed to France with the British Expeditionary Force (BEF) in January 1940. The BEF was deployed on the border of Belgium, around the city of Lille. In May 1940, German armoured forces broke through French positions east of the BEF, and moved rapidly across its rear, separating it from the main French armies.

==== Arras counterattack ====
To close this gap, General Weygand ordered a counterattack by British forces around the city of Arras. "Frankforce" was to include the 5th and 50th Divisions and the 1st Army Tank Brigade.

The attack was actually made by just two battalions of the 151st Brigade, the 6th and 8th DLI, with the 4th and 7th Royal Tank Regiments. The attack made significant progress before it was stopped, and the shocked Germans estimated that five divisions had attacked. It may have been one of the factors for the surprise German halt on 24 May that let the BEF begin evacuation from Dunkirk.

==== Evacuation ====
After the failure of the Arras attack, the BEF had to get out of France. Most of 151st Brigade and 50th Division were fortunate enough to be evacuated from Dunkirk, but had to leave all equipment behind. On returning home, 151st Infantry Brigade and 150th Infantry Brigade were joined by the 69th Infantry Brigade, from the now disbanded 23rd (Northumbrian) Division (formed as a duplicate of the 50th Division), to complete 50th Division and bring it up to standard infantry division establishment. The 151st Brigade was brought up to strength, largely with drafts of men from other regiments, with the 9th DLI receiving men from the King's Shropshire Light Infantry, the 6th from the Argyll and Sutherland Highlanders and only the 8th receiving from the DLI. Together with the rest of the 50th Division, the brigade prepared to repel an expected German invasion.

The 50th Division remained in Britain until 22 April 1941, when it was sent to the Middle East.

=== North Africa ===
In April 1941, 50th Division with the Brigade was dispatched to the Middle East. The Brigade was first deployed in Cyprus, then in Iraq, Syria, and Egypt. In May 1942, 50th Division was deployed in Libya as part of XIII Corps in Eighth Army.

==== Battle of Gazala ====
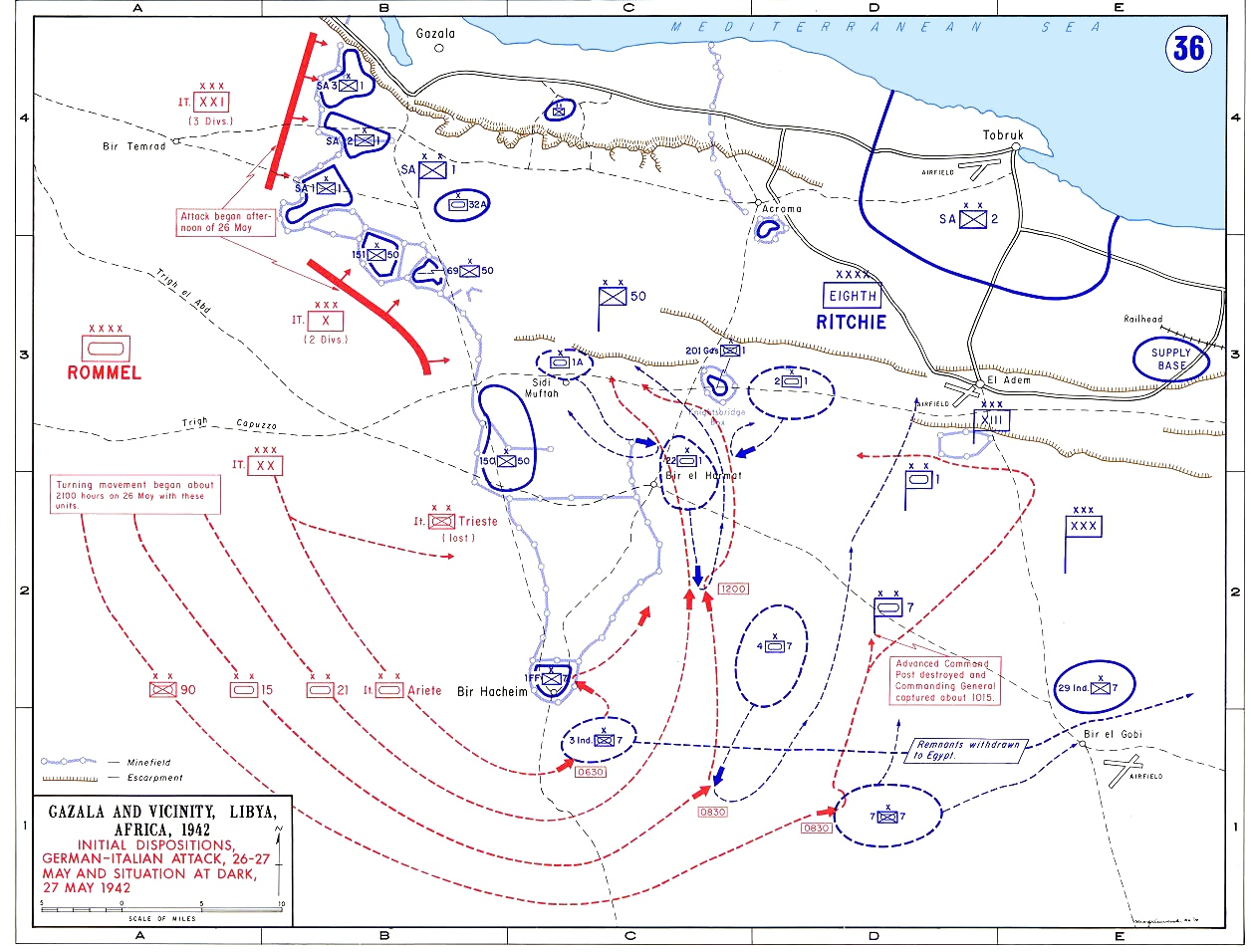
Battle of Gazala in May 1942, in the vicinity of Tobruk

On 27 May 1942, General Erwin Rommel, commander of the German-Italian Afrika Korps, attacked the Allied position at Gazala, leading the Afrika Korps in a flanking march around the left (southern) end of the Allied line. The 50th (Northumbrian) Division held the centre of the Allied line, with 151st Brigade on its right (see map at right–151st Brigade's "box" is due south of the town of Gazala).

During the battle, the 151st Brigade, commanded by Brigadier John S. Nichols since late January 1942, remained facing east against a feigned Axis attack, and did repulse a feinting attack by Italian troops. By 14 June, Rommel had achieved a decisive victory, and the Eighth Army ordered the evacuation of the Gazala line.

The 50th Division was cut off from the coast road to Tobruk, so Major-General William Ramsden, the divisional commander, ordered 151st Brigade (and 69th Brigade) to break through the Italian forces to their front, then circle south before turning east. This remarkable manoeuvre succeeded completely. On the evening of 14 June, 8th Battalion, DLI made 151st Brigade's breakthrough, and the rest of the Brigade followed, except for the 9th Battalion, DLI. 9th DLI was cut off to the west, went north, and joined 1st South African Division's retreat along the coast. The rest of 151st Brigade continued east into Egypt, where the 9th DLI rejoined them.

==== Mersa Matruh ====
50th Division was transferred to X Corps on 24 June.

Eighth Army ordered X Corps and XIII Corps to make a rear-guard stand at Mersa Matruh. 151st Brigade was deployed about 17 miles south of Mersa Matruh. On 27 June, the German 90th Light Division attacked 151st Brigade, striking 9th DLI which lost 300 prisoners. On 28 June, British forces abandoned the Mersa Matruh position. On 1 July, 50th Division was withdrawn into Eighth Army reserve in Egypt.

===== Private Adam Wakenshaw VC =====
Adam Herbert Wakenshaw, 28-year-old private in the 9th DLI, was awarded the Victoria Cross for his valiant actions in the face of the enemy on 27 June 1942 south of Mersa Matruh.

==== El Alamein ====
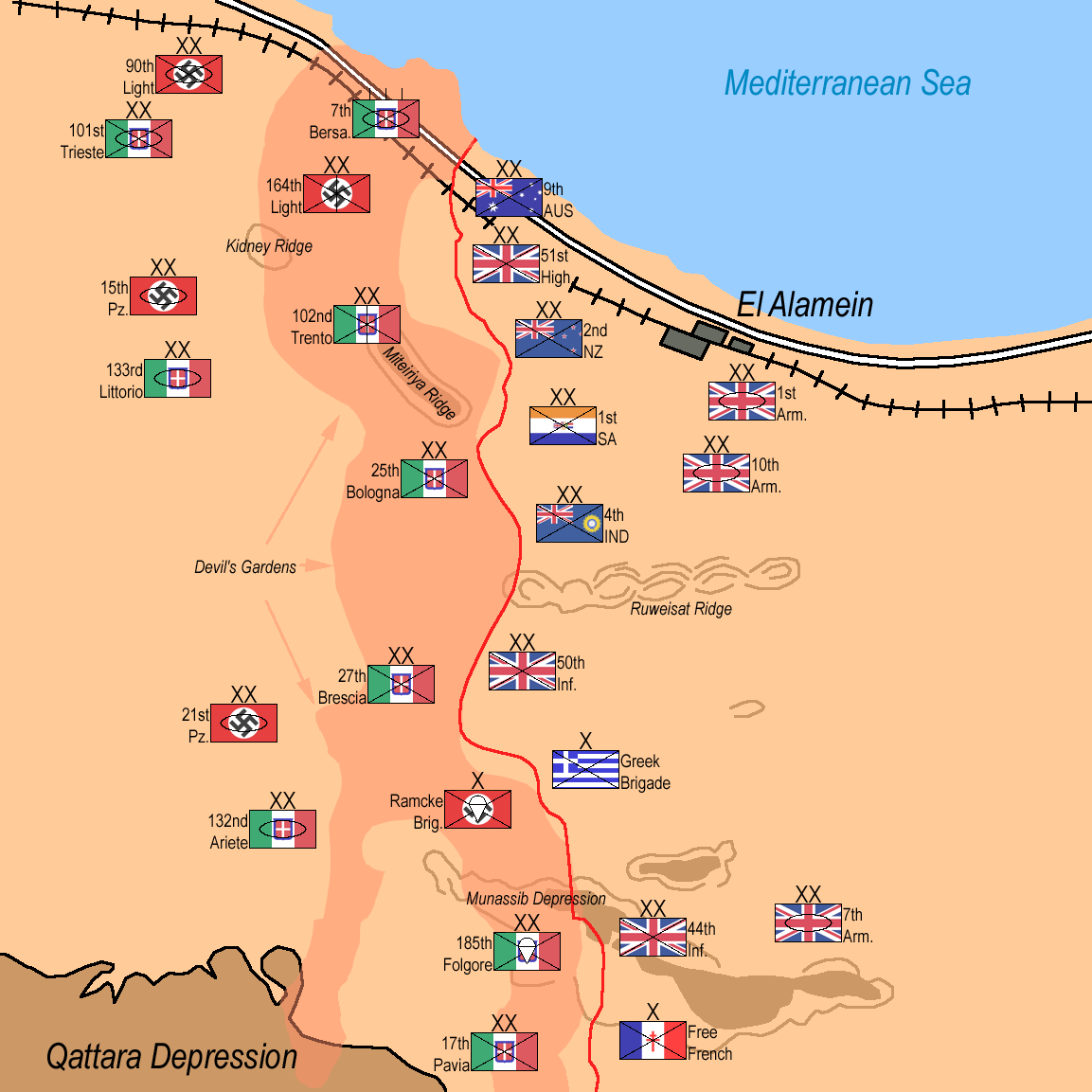
Deployment of forces on the eve of battle

On 5 October, 50th Division rejoined XIII Corps in preparation for the Second Battle of El Alamein. During the opening phase of the battle (24–25 October), 50th Division attacked the Italian 185th Infantry Division "Folgore" in the southern part of the line with little success.

On 29 October, 151st Brigade was attached to the 2nd New Zealand Division for Operation Supercharge, a new attack at "Kidney Ridge" on 2 November. 151st Brigade was on the right for the initial drive through the German minefields, which started at 1 AM and was a success. The next afternoon, while the tank forces battled, 151st Brigade pressed on to "SKINFLINT", a position about two miles west-south-west of Kidney Ridge.

That evening, 151st Brigade was withdrawn to XXX Corps reserve, and took no further part in the battle. On 11 November it was returned to 50th Division.

==== Tunisia ====
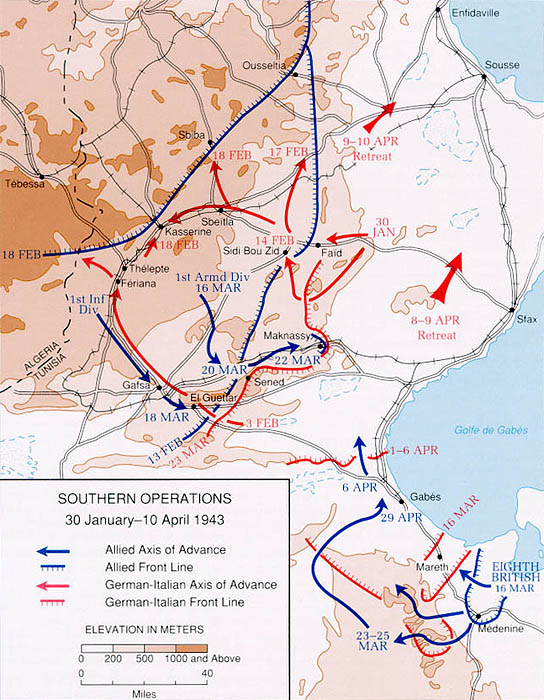
Tunisia campaign

By March 1943, Eighth Army had driven Axis forces all the way across Libya and into Tunisia. Here the Axis forces made a stand, occupying the old French fortifications of the Mareth Line. 50th Division, now part of XXX Corps, was part of the initial assault on 19 March 1943 (Operation Pugilist).

After the collapse of the Mareth Line, Axis forces retreated north, shortening the front. On 24 April, 50th Division was withdrawn to Eighth Army reserve.

=== Invasion of Sicily ===
Allied landings in Sicily on 10 July 1943

50th Division, with the Brigade, was again assigned to XIII Corps for Operation Husky, the Allied invasion of Sicily. On 10 July, the 151st Brigade landed in the Gulf of Noto, at Avola; its objective was the hills above the landing beaches. The Brigade fought in eastern Sicily until 13 August, a few days before the fall of Messina.

=== Northwest Europe ===
==== D-Day ====
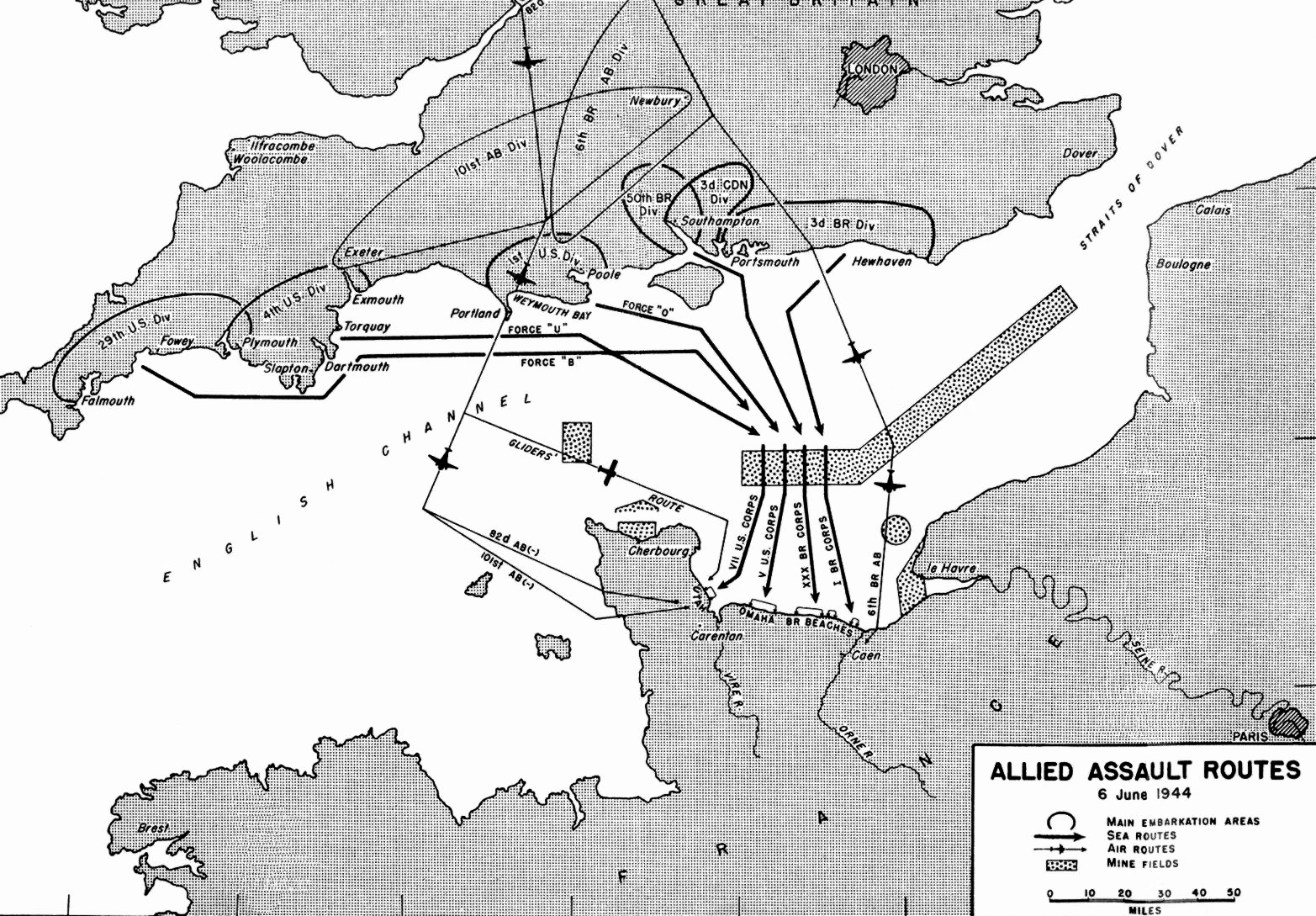
Routes taken by the D-Day invasion

After Sicily, 50th Division, including the Brigade, did not participate in the Allied invasion of Italy. Instead, by request of General Bernard Law Montgomery, on 19 October 1943, 50th Division was withdrawn to Britain for reforming and training, in preparation for the invasion of northwest Europe. The Division and Brigade were under XXX Corps in the British Second Army.

===== Assignment =====
50th Division was designated to land on Gold Beach, in company with the 8th Armoured Brigade. The 151st Brigade was part of the second wave, to land after the beach was secure and push inland. The Brigade was to move southwest from Gold Beach toward Route Nationale 13.

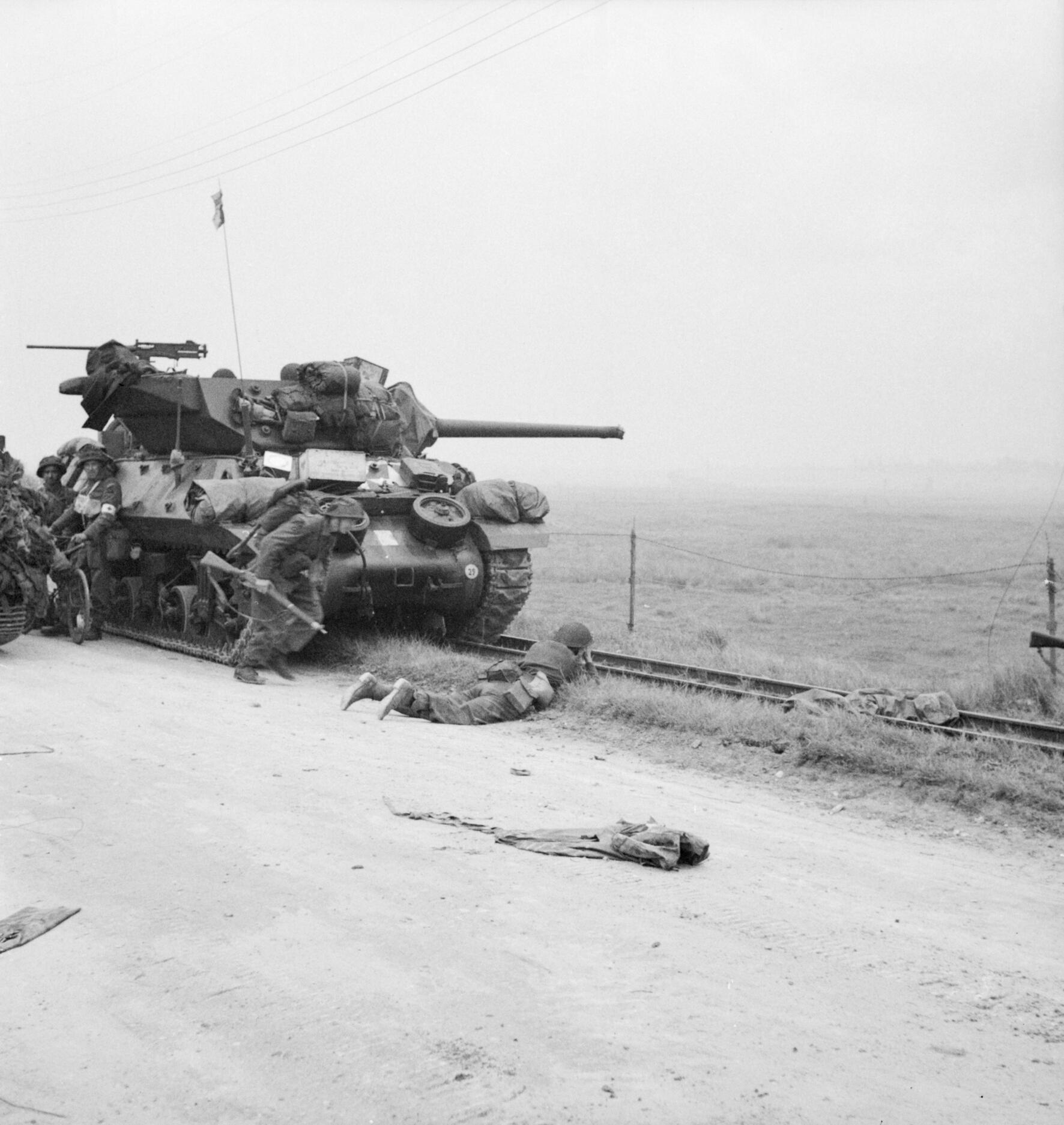
Troops take shelter near an M10 tank destroyer,6 June 1944

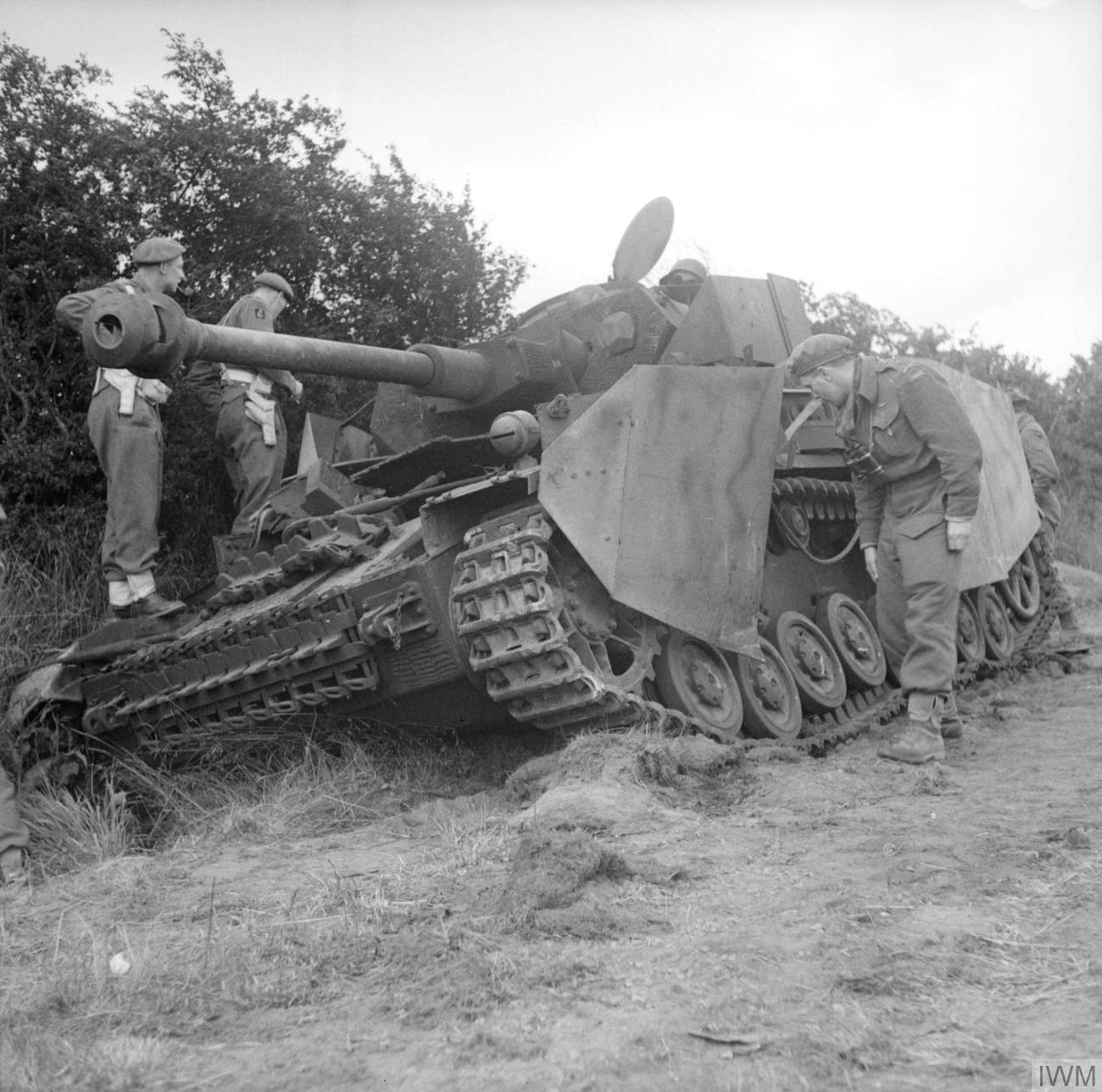
Officers inspect a German Mk IV tank knocked out by the Durham Light Infantry – 11 June 1944.

===== Action =====
The 151st Brigade came ashore as planned, and got to the outskirts of Bayeux. During the next week the Brigade advanced past Bayeux. On 14 June, the Brigade fought in Operation Perch against the Panzer Lehr Division. The Brigade made the initial assault on the villages of Lingèvres and Les Verrières, which were captured by the 9th DLI. Later that day the Brigade and the 231st Brigade, also of the 50th Division, were cut off south of the villages, formed a "brigade box" and repulsed heavy German counterattacks before withdrawing.

The Brigade continued to fight in Normandy until the German rout in August.

==== Operation Market Garden ====
151st Brigade was part of Garden, the ground component of Operation Market-Garden.

The Garden force was XXX Corps, spearheaded by the Guards Armoured Division, with the 43rd Wessex and 50th Division in reserve.

On 23 September, 151st Brigade was ordered to move north and east of Eindhoven with 231st Brigade to guard the right flank.

On 30 September, all of 50th Division was tasked with guarding the bridge and bridgehead north of Nijmegen, called "the Island". The first German counterattack was by seventy tanks and the equivalent of an infantry division. There were several more strong German attacks, and 50th Division and the Brigade took substantial losses.

=== Training service ===
After this very heavy fighting, 50th Division and the Brigade were pulled out of action. On 2 December, the Division and Brigade were withdrawn to Britain, and converted to training formations. The 9th DLI was removed from the Brigade, and replaced by 1st/7th Battalion of the Queen's Royal Surrey Regiment.

== Postwar ==
When 50th (Northumbrian) Division was reconstituted in the Territorial Army in 1947, 151st Brigade was reformed as 151 (Yorkshire & Durham) Infantry Brigade. The brigade had the following composition:

- 4th Battalion, East Yorkshire Regiment, at Kingston upon Hull
- 4th Battalion, Green Howards, at Northallerton
- 6th Battalion, Durham Light Infantry, at Bishop Auckland
- 339 Signal Squadron, Royal Corps of Signals
