= Rudy Duthil =

American advertising executive

Rudy Duthil (born October 16, 1982) is an American advertising executive of Dominican and Cuban descent best known for promoting the use of graffiti murals for advertising purposes across the United States.

== Education and career ==
Duthil graduated from the University of Rhode Island.

In 2008, Duthil founded and served as director of Zoom Forward, a multicultural marketing division at Zoom Media & Marketing, after serving as their West Coast director of Experiential Marketing & Business Development. In 2007, Duthil's was recognized by the ADCOLOR Industry Coalition's “ADCOLOR Awards” Rising Star Award. He has also been recognized by the Creative Media Awards on three occasions: Best Multicultural Creative Campaigns for Nicorette, Greyhound Lines, and Ford in 2007, 2008 and 2009.

Rudy Duthil is also one of the founders of The Marcus Graham Project, an organization dedicated to developing leaders in advertising, media and marketing. In 2009 he founded the Results Driven Agency in Miami.

== Afro-Latino activist ==
Rudy Duthil is also known for his activism in the Afro-Latino movement across the United States. He has published articles such as "Afro-Latino Youth Can Be Gateway For Marketers" and "Crossing the Hispanic Color line" on the Big Tent], a multicultural column featured on Advertising Age.
