= John Duthie =

John Duthie may refer to:

- John Duthie (footballer, born 1903), Scottish professional footballer
- John Duthie (footballer, born 1951) Australian rules footballer
- John Duthie (poker player) (born 1958), English television director and creator of the European Poker Tour
- John Duthie (politician) (1841–1915), politician and businessman in New Zealand
- John Firminger Duthie (1845–1922), English botanist and explorer
- Sir John Duthie (barrister) (1858–1922), prominent Scottish barrister knighted in 1918
