= Jim Duthie (footballer) =

Scottish footballer

Personal information
- Full name: James Duthie
- Date of birth: 23 September 1923
- Place of birth: Forfar, Scotland
- Date of death: 8 February 1972 (aged 48)
- Place of death: Bury St Edmunds, England
- Position: Wing half

Senior career*
Years	Team	Apps	(Gls)
1949–1951	Grimsby Town	40	(0)
1951–1953	Hull City	17	(3)
1953–1958	Southend United	160	(8)
1958–19??	Bury Town		
- * Club domestic league appearances and goals

James Duthie (23 September 1923 – 8 February 1972) was a Scottish professional footballer who played as a wing half.
