= 56th Infantry Brigade (United Kingdom) =

56th Brigade 56th Independent Infantry Brigade 56th Infantry Brigade
- Insignia of the 56th Independent Infantry Brigade, Second World War.
- Active: 1914–1919; 1944–1946; 1987–1993
- Country: United Kingdom
- Branch: Kitchener's Army
- Type: Infantry
- Size: Brigade
- Part of: 19th (Western) Division; 49th (West Riding) Infantry Division

The 56th Infantry Brigade was an infantry brigade of the British Army that saw active service in both the First and the Second World Wars.

== History ==
=== First World War ===
The 56th Brigade was raised soon after the outbreak of the First World War in September 1914 from men, mainly from Lancashire and Northern England, volunteering for Kitchener's New Armies. The 56th Brigade was assigned to the 19th (Western) Division and served on the Western Front from 1915 and was disbanded after the war. The brigade saw service at the Battle of Loos in late 1915, and at during the Somme offensive, at Albert and Pozières and later at Messines in June 1917, Third Ypres and, in 1918, at Sambre, part of the Hundred Days Offensive.

==== Order of battle ====
- 7th (Service) Battalion, King's Own Royal Regiment (Lancaster) (disbanded February 1918)
- 7th (Service) Battalion, East Lancashire Regiment (disbanded February 1918)
- 7th (Service) Battalion, South Lancashire Regiment (disbanded February 1918)
- 7th (Service) Battalion, Loyal Regiment (North Lancashire) (disbanded February 1918)
- 4th (Extra Reserve) Battalion, King's (Liverpool Regiment) (from 3 December 1915 to 19 December 1915)
- 56th Machine Gun Company, Machine Gun Corps (formed 14 February 1916, moved to 19th Battalion, Machine Gun Corps 14 February 1918)
- 56th Trench Mortar Battery (formed 17 June 1916, broken up 5 February 1918, reformed 6 March 1918)
- 9th (Service) Battalion, Cheshire Regiment (from February 1918)
- 1/4th Battalion, King's Shropshire Light Infantry (from February 1918)
- 8th (Service) Battalion, North Staffordshire Regiment (from February 1918)

==== Commanders ====
- Brigadier-General B. G. Lewis (from 18 September 1914, sick 17 December 1915)
- Lieutenant-Colonel C. S. Shepherd (Acting, from 17 December 1915 until 19 December 1915)
- Lieutenant-Colonel C. R. P. Winser (Acting, from 19 December 1915 until 22 December 1915)
- Brigadier-General C. A. C. van Straubenzee (from 22 December 1915 until 6 June 1916)
- Lieutenant-Colonel T. Fitzjohn (Acting, from 6 June 1916 until 11 June 1916)
- Lieutenant-Colonel C. R. P. Winser (Acting, from 11 June 1916 until 13 June 1916)
- Brigadier-General F. G. M. Rowley (from 13 June 1916 until 20 November 1916)
- Brigadier-General W. Long (from 20 November 1916, KIA 28 January 1917)
- Colonel C. V. Trower (Acting, from 28 January 1917 until 1 February 1917)
- Brigadier-General E. Craig-Brown (from 1 February 1917 until 5 September 1917)
- Lieutenant-Colonel T. Fitzjohn (Acting, from 5 September 1917 until 6 September 1917)
- Lieutenant-Colonel C. R. P. Winser (Acting, on 6 September 1917)
- Brigadier-General F. G. Willan (from 6 September 1917, sick 7 April 1918)
- Brigadier-General R. M. Heath (from 7 April 1918)

=== Second World War ===
During the Second World War the 56th Independent Infantry Brigade was reformed in the United Kingdom on 15 February 1944. The brigade consisted of three Regular Army infantry battalions that had all seen service overseas: the 2nd Battalion, South Wales Borderers (SWB), which had fought in the Norwegian Campaign in 1940, 2nd Battalion, Essex Regiment and 2nd Battalion, Gloucestershire Regiment, which both fought at the Battle of Dunkirk in 1940.

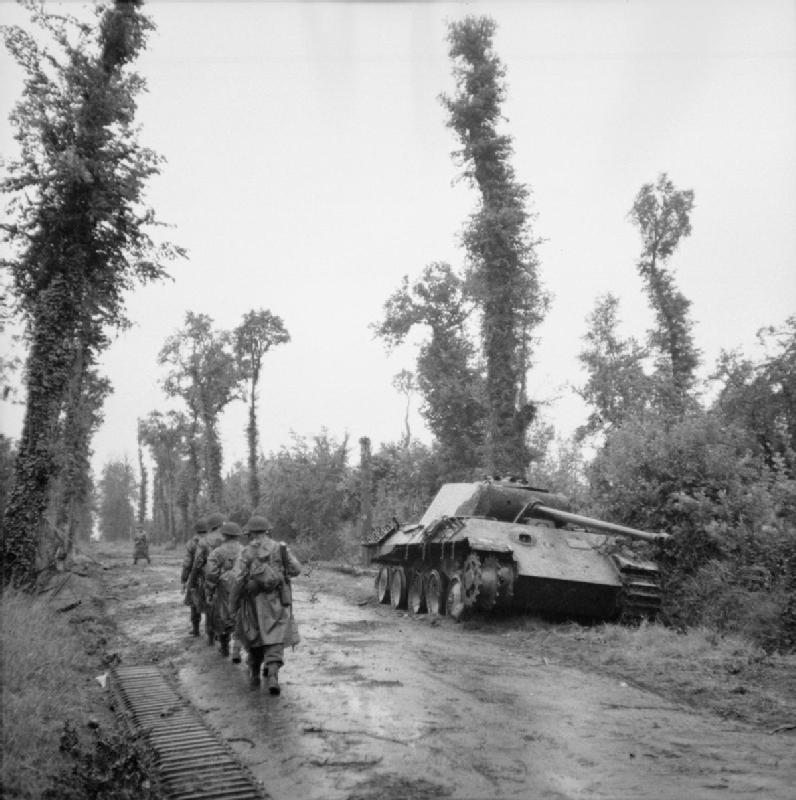
Infantrymen of the 2nd Battalion, Essex Regiment file past a knocked out German Panther tank on a road near Tilly-sur-Seulles, France, 19 June 1944.

The 56th Brigade took part in the D-Day landings on 6 June 1944, as part of the Allied invasion of Normandy, where it formed the right flank of the 50th (Northumbrian) Infantry Division on Gold Beach. It remained attached to the 50th Division until 10 June, after which it was attached to the 7th Armoured Division until 12 June, then reverting to the 50th Division and came under command of the 59th (Staffordshire) Infantry Division in early August 1944. On 20 August the brigade was permanently attached to the 49th (West Riding) Infantry Division, then commanded by Major General Evelyn Barker, a decorated veteran of the Great War. Serving alongside the 56th Brigade in the division were the 146th and 147th Infantry Brigades, along with supporting divisional units. The brigade replaced the 70th Brigade, which was disbanded due to heavy losses.

The 56th Brigade took part in the Normandy landings, liberated Bayeux on 7 June leaving the town mainly intact. All its battalions were involved in the taking of Tilly-sur-Seulles with the 2nd Essex finally investing the town. Later actions were north of St Germain d'Ectot and the liberation of Thury-Harcourt in the Suisse Normande. It was prominent in the drive towards Le Havre and the 49th was one of the assault divisions taking the city in Operation Astonia in September 1944. Continuing to fight in Belgium at Poppel and then the Netherlands it was the assault brigade for the final assault on Arnhem in April 1945. The 56th served well, and ended the war in Germany. The division came mainly under command of First Canadian Army throughout the campaign.

==== Order of battle ====
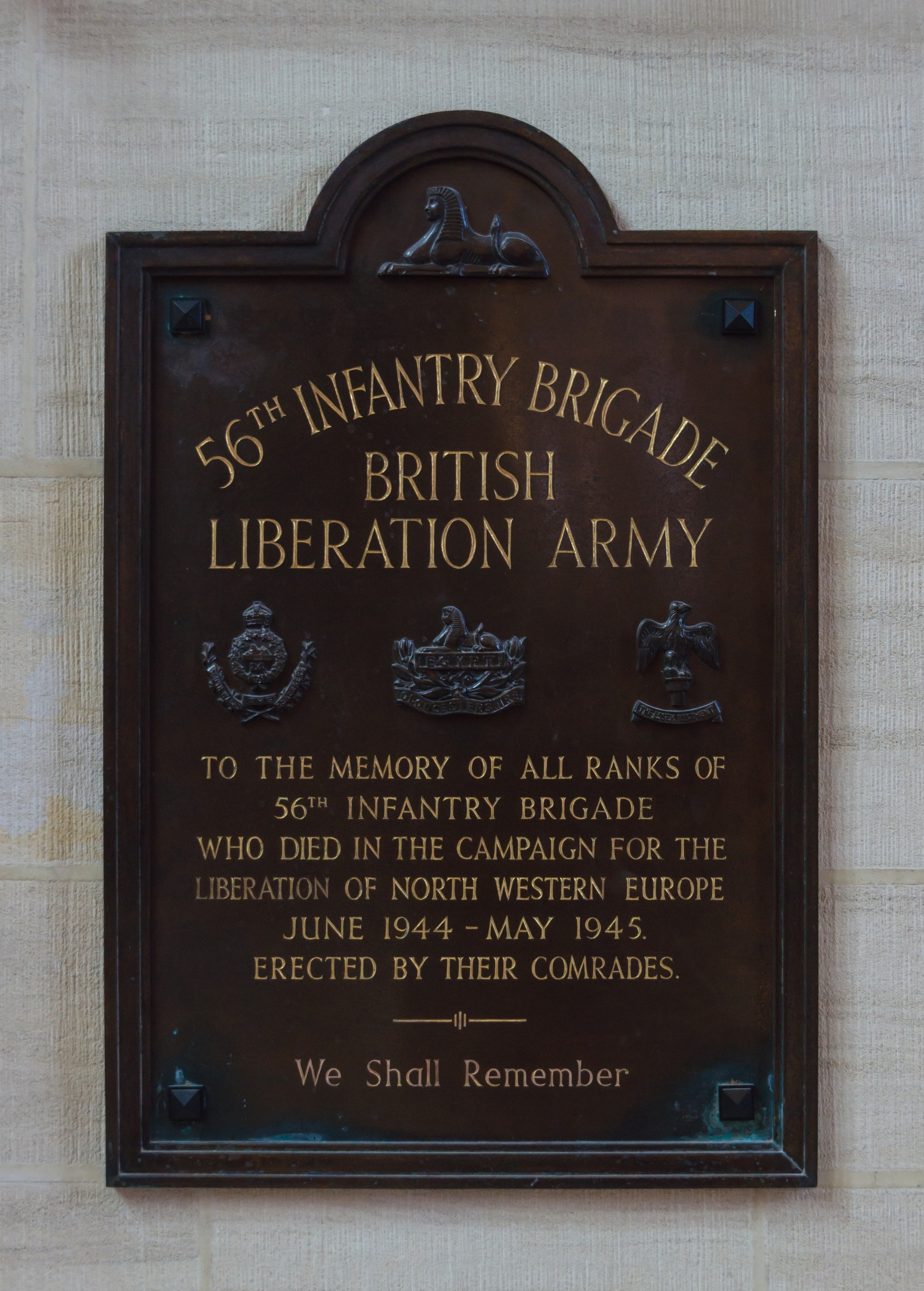
Plaque to the 56th Brigade, with the insignia of the 3 regiments in 1944. Cathedral of Bayeux, Calvados, France.

- 2nd Battalion, South Wales Borderers (until 27 April 1945)
- 2nd Battalion, Gloucestershire Regiment
- 2nd Battalion, Essex Regiment
- 7th (Merionethshire & Montgomeryshire) Battalion, Royal Welch Fusiliers (from 27 April 1945)

==== Commanders ====
- Brigadier E.C. Pepper (from 27 February 1944 until 4 July 1944)
- Brigadier M.S. Ekin (from 4 July 1944, KIA 4 November 1944)
- Lieutenant-Colonel M. Lewis ( Acting, from 4 to 9 November 1944)
- Brigadier W.F.H. Kempster (from 9 November until 3 December 1944)
- Lieutenant-Colonel T.H. Wilsey (Acting, from 3 to 9 December 1944)
- Brigadier W.F.H. Kempster (from 9 December 1944 until 20 January 1945)
- Lieutenant Colonel R.H.C. Bray (Acting, from 20 to 23 January 1945)
- Brigadier R.H. Senior (from 23 to 27 January 1945)
- Lieutenant-Colonel R.H.C. Bray (Acting, from 27 January until 6 February 1945)
- Brigadier R.H. Senior (from 6 February until 14 August 1945)
- Brigadier K.G. Exham (from 14 August 1945)

=== Post War ===
In 1986, in accordance with the latest policy of having all units in the UK under a Brigade headquarters, 56 (London) Brigade was formed with its headquarters in Horse Guards. (The Brigade was named in memory and recognition of 56 Division of Second World War fame.) The Foot Guards Lieutenant Colonels therefore ceased to command their Regiments. The Brigade Headquarters, commanded first by Brigadier DH B-H Blundell, was made responsible for administration and training of all London District units.

The Gulabin sources gave the Deputy Commander London District and Brigade Commander, March 1985-May 1988 as Dermot H. Blundell-Hollinshead-Blundell.

Antony Beevor's book Inside the British Army gave the formation date of the brigade as January 1987. Brigadier A G Ross, Scots Guards, was in command of the brigade when the 1992/93 training directive was issued. The brigade was disbanded in 1993.

== Victoria Cross recipients ==
- Lieutenant Thomas Orde Lawder Wilkinson, 7th (Service) Battalion, Loyal Regiment (North Lancashire), First World War
- Private James Miller, 7th (Service) Battalion, King's Own Royal Regiment (Lancaster), First World War
