= Charles Armitage =

English cricketer (1849–1917)

Charles Armitage JP DL
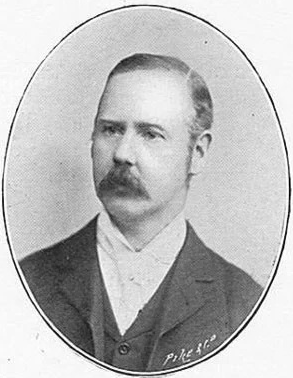
- Born: Charles Ingram Armitage; 28 April 1849; Huddersfield, Yorkshire, England
- Died: 24 April 1917 (aged 67); Honley, Yorkshire, England
- Family: General Charles Clement Armitage (son); Brigadier Charles Armitage (grandson)
- Cricket career

Cricket information
- Bowling: Left-arm fast
- Role: Bowler

Domestic team information
- Years: Team
- 1873–1878: Yorkshire County Cricket Club

Charles Ingram Armitage (28 April 1849 – 24 April 1917) was an English amateur cricketer, who played first-class cricket for Yorkshire County Cricket Club. Although he appeared only three times, his career spanned six years, from 1873 to 1878. His father-in-law was William Coates, a career soldier.

== Early life ==
Armitage was born at Birky Grange, Huddersfield, Yorkshire, son of Joseph Taylor Armitage JP DL a descendent of one of the oldest families in West Riding. He was baptized on the 14 July 1849.

He was educated privately and also educated in Brussels.

== Cricket ==
Although a left arm fast bowler, he failed to take a wicket for Yorkshire – he bowled just one spell of six overs, two maidens, for 29 runs. He found little more success with the bat, scoring just 26 runs in his five innings in the middle order, with a top score of 12 and an average of 5.20. He made no catches.

The first of his two appearances in 1873 was against Gloucestershire at Bramall Lane in Sheffield, in July. Yorkshire's decision to bat after winning the toss proved unwise as they were skittled out for 113, with Armitage at number six run out for 7. W.G. Grace scored 79 and Townsend 88 in the visitors' 282, despite Armitage's one and only spell of bowling in first-class cricket. He was bowled for a duck in Yorkshire's second effort of 247, and Gloucestershire completed their six-wicket victory in 32 overs, with two more Grace brothers making contributions with the bat.

Armitage's second match, against Nottinghamshire at St. John's Ground in Huddersfield, was a more satisfying affair. Although he made just 12 in Yorkshire's 194 and did not bowl, the visitors were dismissed for 104 and 66 to lose by an innings and 24 runs.

Despite this turn in fortunes, Yorkshire did not call on his services again until the Australian tourists came to Fartown in Huddersfield in May 1878. Yorkshire made a poor start, dismissed for just 72 by Spofforth (4-30) and Boyle (5-32). Batting at number six, Armitage scored two runs before being bowled by Boyle. Australia fared little better in reply, posting 113 with Emmet taking 5 for 23. An Armitage did bowl and take a wicket for Yorkshire, but it was his namesake Tom. Yorkshire did one run better second time around: Spofforth took 5 for 31, while Armitage was dismissed caught Gregory bowled Midwinter for five, in his final first-class match. The Australians lost four wickets to Emmett and Hill, but won in 40.2 overs, and the first-class career of Armitage was done.

== Later life ==
=== Political activism ===
==== Conservative Club ====
Armitage was a supporter of the Milnsbridge Conservative Club. As the club's membership expanded, the existing premises became inadequate. Armitage, the landlord of the building, offered to demolish the structure and build a replacement, on the condition that the club purchase it from him at cost price. The new clubhouse was completed by 1891, by which time membership had reached 230.

To fund the purchase from Armitage, the club held a three-day "International Bazaar" aimed at raising £2,085.

In 1895, Armitage proposed a vote of confidence in Sir Joseph Crosland, arguing for "a necessity of some restriction being placed on immigration of foreign pauper aliens into the country."

==== Women's suffrage ====
On 5 September 1907, Armitage, was appointed as one of many vice presidents for the local Huddersfield, National Union of Women's Suffrage Societies.

=== Family business ===
Upon the death of his father Joseph Taylor Armitage in 1880, he was one of the Principals of the family business Armitage Brothers. The business was noted as specializing in fine wools. The company would win two gold medals at both the Melbourne and Brussels exhibitions in 1888. Armitage was still in this position as of 1914.

== Private life ==
Armitage died at High Royd House, Honley, Yorkshire, at the age of 67.
