= General Stockwell =

General Stockwell may refer to:

- Clifton Inglis Stockwell (1879–1953), British Army brigadier general
- Hugh Stockwell (1903–1986), British Army general
- Hunt Stockwell, fictional lieutenant general appearing in the TV series, The A-Team
