= Robert Collins (British Army officer) =

British Army general (1880–1950)

Major-General Robert Collins CMG DSO
- Born: 22 August 1880
- Died: 6 March 1950 (aged 69); Winchester, Hampshire, England
- Military career
- Allegiance: United Kingdom
- Branch: British Army
- Service years: 1899–1938; 1939–1941
- Rank: Major-General
- Service number: 5261
- Unit: Royal Berkshire Regiment
- Commands: 73rd Brigade; 9th Infantry Brigade; 7th Infantry Brigade; 3rd (Meerut) Indian Division; 61st Infantry Division; Staff College, Camberley
- Conflicts: Second Boer War; First World War; Second World War
- Awards: Companion of the Order of St Michael and St George; Distinguished Service Order; Mentioned in Despatches (8); Knight of the Legion of Honour (France)

Major-General Robert John Collins, CMG, DSO (22 August 1880 – 6 March 1950) was a British Army officer who served as Commandant of the Staff College, Camberley, from 1939 to 1941.

== Military career ==
Educated at Marlborough College, Collins, after service with the 6th Warwick Militia during the Second Boer War, was commissioned into the Royal Berkshire Regiment in 1899. He fought in the Second Boer War and then served with the Egyptian Army until 1911 and attended the Staff College, Camberley, from 1913 to 1914, where J. F. C. Fuller was one of his fellow students.

Collins took part in the First World War, becoming a general staff officer, grade 2 in succession to Brevet Lieutenant Colonel Francis Gathorne-Hardy in March 1915 and was promoted to major on 1 September 1915. In March 1916 he was awarded the French Legion of Honour and was Chief Instructor at the Staff School in Cambridge during the last year of the war. He was appointed commander of the 73rd Brigade later in 1918.

With the war over, Collins became an instructor at the Staff College, Camberley, in 1919, and being made a brevet colonel in July 1922, before taking up a post as Director of Military Training in India in 1924. He went on to be commandant of the Small Arms School in 1929 and General Officer Commanding (GOC) of the 3rd (Meerut) Indian Division in 1934 before retiring in 1938. He was recalled at the start of the Second World War to be GOC of the 61st Infantry Division followed by being made commandant of the Staff College, Camberley, before retiring again in 1941.

Collins was one of the founders, with Phoebe Cusden, of the Reading Düsseldorf Association which provided help from the people of Reading in Berkshire for the people of Düsseldorf in Germany, which had been heavily bombed during the war. He was also author of Lord Wavell, 1883–1941 – A military biography (Hodder and Stoughton, London, 1947).

== Family ==
In 1912 Collins married Violet Agnes Monro.

== Bibliography ==
- Smart, Nick (2005). Biographical Dictionary of British Generals of the Second World War. Barnesley: Pen & Sword. ISBN 1844150496.

Military offices
Preceded by Arthur McNamara	Commandant of the Small Arms School; 1929–1932	Succeeded by Cyril Gepp
New command	GOC 61st Infantry Division; September–November 1939	Succeeded by Adrian Carton de Wiart
Preceded by Bernard Paget	Commandant of the Staff College, Camberley; 1939–1941	Succeeded by Montagu Stopford
Honorary titles
Preceded by Sir Felix Ready	Colonel of the Royal Berkshire Regiment; 1940–1947	Succeeded by Sir Miles Dempsey
