= Ben Whitaker (politician) =

British barrister and Labour Party politician

Benjamin Charles George Whitaker CBE (15 September 1934 – 8 June 2014) was a British barrister and Labour Party politician.

== Early life ==
He was the third son of Major-General Sir John Albert Charles Whitaker, 2nd Baronet of Babworth Hall, Retford, Nottinghamshire. He was educated at Eton before undergoing a period of National Service as an officer in the Coldstream Guards from 1952 to 1954. He subsequently entered New College, Oxford where he obtained a BA in Modern History before being called to the bar at the Inner Temple in 1959.

== Career ==
He practised as a barrister from 1959, and as an extramural lecturer in law for the University of London from 1963.

He was elected at the 1966 general election as Member of Parliament (MP) for the normally Conservative seat of Hampstead. Shortly after his election to the House of Commons he was appointed parliamentary private secretary (PPS) to Anthony Greenwood, Minister of Overseas Development. Later in the year Greenwood was appointed to the post of Minister of Housing and Local Government, and Whitaker continued to serve as PPS in the new department. In 1969 Whitaker was advanced to the rank of parliamentary secretary, or junior minister, in the Department of Overseas Development.

At the 1970 general election, he was narrowly defeated by the Conservative Geoffrey Finsberg, who regained the seat for his party with a majority of 474 votes. Following his defeat, Whitaker indicated that he was unlikely to stand for parliament again as he was hoping to take up a research post.

He was active in a number of charities and foundations, particularly relating to global poverty. These included being an executive director of Minority Rights Group International from 1971 to 1988 and of the UK branch of the Calouste Gulbenkian Foundation, and serving on the United Nations Commission on Human Rights for fifteen years.

An admirer of George Orwell, Whitaker was a leading member of a memorial trust, which erected a plaque to the writer in Hampstead and sought to have a statue installed at the BBC's Broadcasting House. It was announced in August 2016 that Westminster city council had granted planning permission and that the project would go ahead, funded by £110,000 in private donations. The statue, by sculptor Martin Jennings, was unveiled in November 2017.

== Personal life ==
In 1964, he married Janet Alison Stewart, who was created a life peer in 1999 as Baroness Whitaker, of Beeston in the County of Nottinghamshire. The couple settled in Swiss Cottage in the Metropolitan Borough of Hampstead, London, and had three children, Daniel, Quincy, and Ras. Ben Whitaker has another son by a previous relationship called Aaron.

He was made a Commander of the Order of the British Empire (CBE) in the New Year's Honours 2000 for "services to Human Rights and to the Voluntary Sector". He died on 8 June 2014 at the age of 79.

== See also ==
- Whitaker baronets, of Babworth

Parliament of the United Kingdom
| Preceded by Henry Brooke | Member of Parliament for Hampstead; 1966–1970 | Succeeded by Geoffrey Finsberg |
