= Master-General of the Ordnance (India) =

Military position in the Indian Army

Master-General of the Ordnance of Indian Army
- Integrated Headquarters of Ministry of Defence (Army)
- Reports to: Vice Chief of the Army Staff
- Seat: South Block, New Delhi
- Precursor: Master-General of the Ordnance (British India)
- Formation: 1920 (British Raj); 1947 (Modern Indian Army)

The Master-General of the Ordnance (MGO) was historically one of the senior-most appointments within the Indian Army, served by a senior military officer holding the rank of lieutenant general. The MGO operated as a key staff officer at the Integrated Headquarters of the Ministry of Defence (Army) in New Delhi, directing the entire logistical pipeline, global procurement, and lifecycle maintenance of weaponry, ammunition, vehicles, and electronics for the force. In a structural reorganization of the army headquarters, the traditional responsibilities of the MGO were transitioned and absorbed under the newly established office of the Master-General of Sustenance (MGS) to optimize revenue procurement and combat readiness.

== Masters-General prior to Independence ==
Before the partition of the subcontinent and the establishment of the modern Indian Army in 1947, the office was occupied by senior British Army officers appointed to manage the military logistics of the Raj. Masters-general during this period included:

- 1924–1930: Edwin Henry de Vere Atkinson
- 1930–1934: Bertram Richard Kirwan
- 1934–1938: Henry Edward ap Rhys Pryce
- 1938–1942: Charles Clement Armitage
- 1942–1944: Clarence August Bird
- 1944–1947: Kenneth Morley Loch

== See also ==
- Chief of the Army Staff (India)
- List of serving generals of the Indian Army
