= Clarence Bird =

British Army officer and colonial administrator

Lieutenant-General Sir Clarence Bird KCIE CB DSO
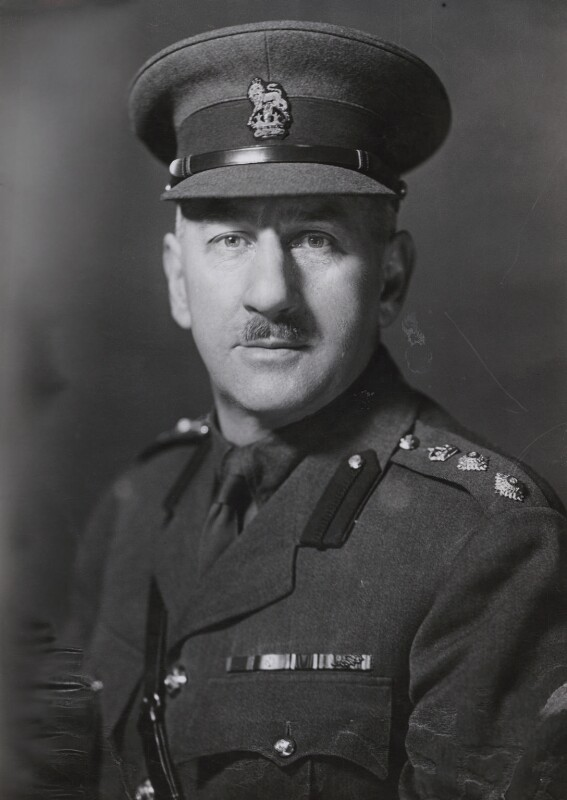
- Born: 5 February 1885; Whalley, Lancashire, England
- Died: 30 July 1986 (aged 101); Tunbridge Wells, Kent, England
- Military career
- Allegiance: United Kingdom
- Branch: British Army
- Service years: 1904–1944
- Rank: Lieutenant-General
- Service number: 3212
- Unit: Royal Engineers
- Commands: Bengal Sappers & Miners; Engineer-in-Chief (India)
- Conflicts: First World War; Second World War
- Awards: Knight Commander of the Order of the Indian Empire; Companion of the Order of the Bath; Distinguished Service Order; Mentioned in Despatches

Lieutenant-General Sir Clarence August Bird, KCIE, CB, DSO (5 February 1885 – 30 July 1986) was a British Army officer and colonial administrator, who served as Chairman of Rhodesia Railways, and who lived to the age of 101.

== Early life ==
Bird was born in Whalley, Lancashire, and educated at Cheltenham College, before attending the Royal Military Academy, Woolwich.

== Military career ==
He commissioned into the Royal Engineers on 12 December 1904. Between 1907 and 1913 he served in India, before going to France with the Indian Expeditionary Force upon the outbreak of the First World War. In 1917, he was awarded the Distinguished Service Order and returned to India. He attended the Staff College, Camberley in 1921 but otherwise remained in India until 1925.

Between 1926 and 1929, Bird was Chief Instructor in Fortification at the Royal School of Military Engineering, before commanding the Bengal Sappers & Miners from 1930 to 1933. Bird then worked at Aldershot Command until 1939, and was promoted to major-general in October that year. From 1939 to 1942, he was Engineer-in-Chief at Army HQ in India, and was made a Companion of the Order of the Bath in 1940. Between 1942 and 1944 Bird was Master-General of the Ordnance of the British Indian Army, and in 1943 was made a Knight Commander of the Order of the Indian Empire. He retired from the army in July 1944.

Between July 1942 and 1952 Bird was Colonel Commandant of the Royal Engineers and was Colonel Commandant, Indian Electrical and Mechanical Engineers from 1944 to 1948.

== Later years and death ==
From 1944 to 1945, Bird was a Regional Commissioner in the Department of Food, Government of India. He was a Special Commissioner from 1945 to 1947 and then worked at the Ministry of Food until 1948. Between 1948 and 1953 he was Chairman of the Rhodesia Railways.

He was a Fellow of the Royal Society of Arts. He settled in Tunbridge Wells, Kent, where he died on 30 July 1986, at the age of 101, making him the oldest British general of the Second World War to reach that age, only Philip Christison, who lived to 100, being younger.

== Bibliography ==
- Smart, Nick (2005). Biographical Dictionary of British Generals of the Second World War. Barnsley, South Yorkshire: Pen and Sword Books. ISBN 1844150496.

Military offices
Preceded by Clement Armitage	Master-General of the Ordnance (India); 1942−1944	Succeeded by Kenneth Loch
