= 7th Light Mechanised Brigade =

- Formation badge, harking back to the "Desert Rats" badge of 7th Armoured Brigade
- Active: 1815–1945; 2014 –
- Country: United Kingdom
- Branch: British Army
- Type: Infantry
- Size: Brigade
- Part of: 1st (United Kingdom) Division
- Garrison/HQ: Kendrew Barracks, Cottesmore
- Engagements: Crimean War; Second Boer War; First World War; Second World War

Commanders
- Notable commanders: Walter Kitchener; Frederick McCracken; George Lindsay; William Platt

The 7th Light Mechanised Brigade is a formation in the British Army with a direct lineage to 7th Armoured Brigade and a history that stretches back to the Napoleonic Wars. It saw active service in the Crimean War, the Second Boer War and both the First and the Second World Wars. In 2014, the 7th Armoured Brigade was re-designated as 7th Infantry Brigade, thereby ensuring that the famed "Desert Rats" continue in the British Army's Order of battle.

== History ==
=== Waterloo Campaign ===
When Wellington organized his troops into numbered divisions for the Peninsular War, the component brigades were named for the commanding officer. (Note: This could be a source of confusion as brigades acquired new commanders, or they moved between brigades, or indeed if two officers with the same surname commanded brigades simultaneously, for example Campbell's Brigade of 1st Division and Campbell's Brigade of 4th Division on 18 June 1809.) For the Hundred Days Campaign, he numbered his British infantry brigades in a single sequence, 1st to 10th. The 7th Brigade formed part of the 7th Division under the command of Major-general Kenneth MacKenzie. It consisted of:

- 2nd Battalion, 25th (the King's Own Borderers) Regiment of Foot
- 2nd Battalion, 37th (the North Hampshire) Regiment of Foot
- 2nd Battalion, 78th (Highlanders) Regiment of Foot (or The Ross-shire Buffs)

It was assigned to garrison duty and so played no part in the Battle of Waterloo.

=== Crimean War ===
The 7th Brigade formed part of the 4th Division in the Crimean War. At the Battle of the Alma it was commanded by Brigadier-General Arthur Wellesley Torrens and consisted of:

- 20th (the East Devonshire) Regiment of Foot
- 21st Regiment of Foot (Royal North British Fusiliers)
- 68th (Durham) Regiment of Foot (Light Infantry)

The brigade was present with the 4th Division at the Battle of Balaclava and played a more major role at the Battle of Inkerman.

=== Second Boer War and pre-First World War ===
After the Relief of Ladysmith, part of the garrison of Ladysmith were reorganized into the 7th Brigade on 10 March 1900. It consisted of

- 1st Battalion, Devonshire Regiment
- 1st Battalion, Manchester Regiment
- 2nd Battalion, Gordon Highlanders
- 2nd Battalion, Rifle Brigade (Prince Consort's Own)

Initially commanded by Colonel W.G. Knox CB, it was taken over by Brigadier-General Walter Kitchener on 26 March. The brigade formed part of Lyttelton's 4th Division and took part in Sir Redvers Buller's advance north. In August 1900, it took part in the Battle of Bergendal, the last set-piece battle of the war.

Post-war, the brigade was reformed in January 1906 as part of the 4th Division, before joining the 3rd Division in Southern Command in 1907.

=== First World War ===
At the outbreak of the First World War in August 1914, the 7th Brigade was a regular army formation stationed at Tidworth and assigned to the 3rd Division. It mobilized with the division, crossed to France between 11 and 16 August, concentrated around Aulnoye and Avesnes, and moved forward on 21 August 1914. Other than a brief period when it was reorganized in England in 1918, the brigade served with the 3rd and 25th Divisions on the Western Front throughout the war.

==== 3rd Division ====
With the 3rd Division, the brigade took part in a large number of actions in 1914: the Battle of Mons (23 and 24 August) and subsequent retreat (24 August – 5 September) including the action of Solesmes and the Battle of Le Cateau. It then took part in the First Battle of the Marne (6 – 9 September) and the Race to the Sea: First Battle of the Aisne (13 – 20 September), and the battles of La Bassée (10 October – 2 November), Messines (31 October – 2 November), Armentières (1 and 2 November) culminating in the First Battle of Ypres (5 – 21 November), notably the Battle of Nonne Bosschen (11 November). 1915 was relatively quieter, but included the First Attack on Bellewaarde (16 June), Hooge (19 July) and the Second Attack on Bellewaarde (25 September).

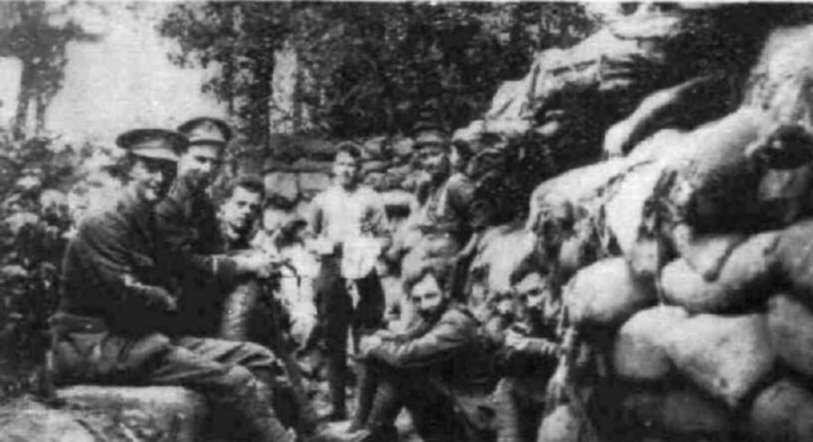
Officers of the 3rd Battalion, Worcestershire Regiment, at Sanctuary Wood, France, August 1915.

While with the 3rd Division, the brigade commanded

- 3rd Battalion, Worcestershire Regiment
- 2nd Battalion, South Lancashire Regiment
- 1st Battalion, Wiltshire Regiment
- 2nd Battalion, Royal Irish Rifles
- 1/1st Battalion, Honourable Artillery Company (T.F.) – joined from 8th Infantry Brigade on 9 December 1914; left for GHQ Troops on 14 October 1915
- 1/4th Battalion, South Lancashire Regiment (T.F.) – joined on 24 February 1915 and became divisional pioneer battalion on 12 October 1915

==== 25th Division ====
On 18 October 1915, 7th Brigade was posted to the 25th Division in exchange for 76th Brigade as part of a policy of "stiffening" New Army Divisions with regular units. Once there, it was extensively reorganized on 26 October:

- 2nd Battalion, Royal Irish Rifles transferred to 74th Brigade in exchange for 10th (Service) Battalion, Cheshire Regiment
- 2nd Battalion, South Lancashire Regiment transferred to 75th Brigade in exchange for 8th (Service) Battalion, Loyal Regiment (North Lancashire)

On 12 January 1916, the brigade formed the 7th Machine Gun Company and was joined by the 7th Trench Mortar Battery on 18 June 1916.

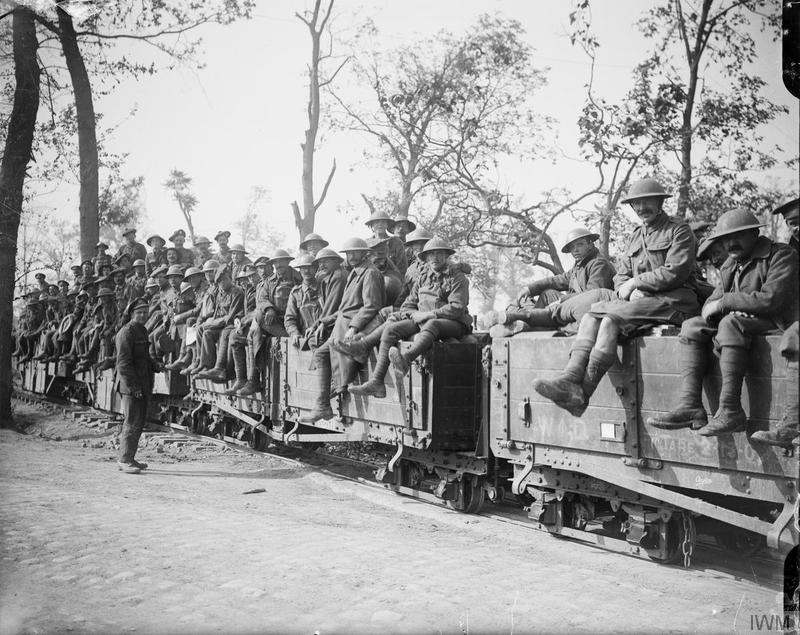
Battle of Polygon Wood. Troops of the 7th Brigade, 3rd Division going up by light railway to the attack in which they took Zonnebeke. Pilckem Ridge, 25 September 1917.

The brigade saw action in 1916 defending against the German attack on the Vimy Ridge (21 May) but particularly in the Battle of the Somme, including the battles of Albert (3 – 13 July), Bazentin Ridge (14 – 16 July), Pozières Ridge (18 August – 3 September including the fighting for Mouquet Farm on 3 September) and Ancre Heights (1 – 22 October including the capture of the Stuff Redoubt and the Regina Trench). In 1917 it saw action at the Battle of Messines (7 – 14 June) and the Third Battle of Ypres (31 July – 10 August). On 13 October 1917, 4th (Extra Reserve) Battalion, South Staffordshire Regiment (Note: The 4th (Extra Reserve) Battalion, South Staffordshire Regiment was originally the 2nd Battalion, King's Own (1st Staffordshire) Militia, transferred to the Special Reserve (SR) by Haldane's military reforms on 2 August 1908. (The 1st Battalion, King's Own (1st Staffordshire) Militia became the 3rd (Reserve) Battalion, South Staffordshire Regiment at the same time.) Special Reserve battalions were intended to train replacements and provide drafts to the regular (1st and 2nd) battalions. Just five of 101 SR battalions were posted to active fronts, the others being the 7th (Extra Reserve) Battalion, Royal Fusiliers 4th (Extra Reserve) Battalion, King's (Liverpool Regiment), 4th (Extra Reserve) Battalion, Bedfordshire Regiment, and 4th (Extra Reserve) Battalion, North Staffordshire Regiment.) joined the brigade and on 10 November the 3rd Battalion, Worcestershire Regiment transferred to 74th Brigade.

On 1 March, the 7th Machine Gun Company joined the 74th, 75th and (divisional) 195th Machine Gun Companies in the 25th Battalion, Machine Gun Corps. Due to a shortage of manpower, all British (Note: As distinct from the Australian, Canadian and the New Zealand divisions which remained on a 12-battalion basis.) divisions on the Western Front were reduced from a 12-battalion to a 9-battalion basis in February 1918. As a consequence, 7th Brigade was reduced from four to three battalions. (Note: On 16 February 1918, 8th Loyals was disbanded with 21 officers and 480 other ranks drafted to 2/4th and 1/5th Loyals in 170th (2/1st North Lancashire) Brigade, 57th (2nd West Lancashire) Division, and the remainder absorbed by the 5th Entrenching Battalion.) Almost immediately, the German Army's Spring Offensive fell upon the division. The 25th Division was remarkably unlucky; having faced the first German onslaught at the First Battles of the Somme (21 – 25 March), it was moved north to refit, where it faced the second offensive in the Battles of the Lys (9 – 29 April). It was once again moved south to a quiet part of the line where it was attacked for the third time in the Battle of the Aisne (27 May – 6 June).

Due to losses sustained, the division was withdrawn from the line and the brigades were reduced to cadre. The divisional and brigade HQs returned to England with 10th Cheshires and 10 other Training Cadre (T.C.) battalions, arriving on 30 June. For the 7th Brigade this meant:

- 10th (Service) Battalion, Cheshire Regiment was reduced to Training Cadre on 21 June (Note: 10th Cheshires provided 10 officers and 353 other ranks to 9th Cheshires in 56th Brigade, 19th (Western) Division.) and went to England with the brigade
- 4th (E.R.) Battalion, South Staffordshire Regiment joined No. 1 Battalion, Composite Brigade on 21 June and transferred with it to 50th (Northumbrian) Division the next day (Note: 25th Division formed a Composite Brigade on 21 and 22 June 1918 with 4th South Staffs and 11th Lancashire Fusiliers (as No. 1 Battalion), 8th Border Regiment and 9th Loyals (as No. 2 Battalion) and 6th Cheshires (as No 3 Battalion).)
- 1st Battalion, Wiltshire Regiment transferred to 110th Brigade, 21st Division on 20 June
- 7th Trench Mortar Battery was broken up on 18 June and the personnel helped to form a Light T.M. Battery for the Composite Brigade
- 8th (Service) Battalion, Leicestershire Regiment joined as a T.C. from 110th Brigade, 21st Division at Boulogne on 30 June and went to England with the brigade
- 13th (Service) Battalion, East Surrey Regiment joined as a T.C. from 119th Brigade, 40th Division at Boulogne on 30 June and went to England with the brigade

The brigade arrived in England on 30 June and went to Mytchett Camp, Aldershot. Soon after, the T.C. battalions left the brigade (10th Cheshires and 8th Leicesters on 7 July, 13th East Surreys on 16 July) for Eastern Command where they were reformed.

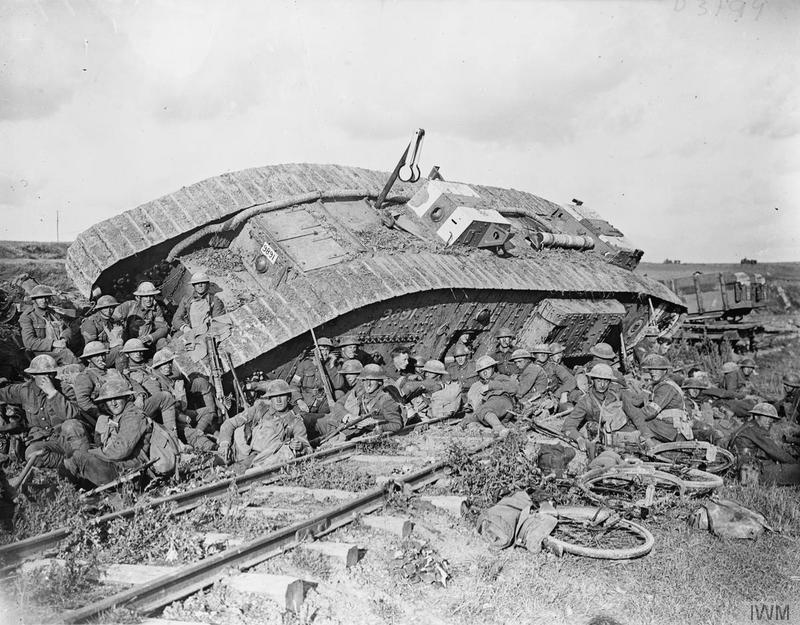
Men of the 20th (Service) Battalion, Manchester Regiment resting by a tank (serial number 9891), disabled by side-slipping down a railway embankment, near Premont, 8 October 1918.

The brigade HQ returned to France with 25th Division HQ on 15 September, arriving at Saint-Riquier near Abbeville the next day. Units left behind in France (artillery, engineers, signals, pioneers, machine gunners, etc.) rejoined the division between then and 19 October. The brigade was reformed on 16 September with battalions withdrawn from the Italian Front:

- 9th (Service) Battalion, Devonshire Regiment from 20th Brigade, 7th Division
- 20th (Service) Battalion, Manchester Regiment from 22nd Brigade, 7th Division
- 21st (Service) Battalion, Manchester Regiment from 91st Brigade, 7th Division
- 7th Trench Mortar Battery began reforming on 13 October

Thereafter the brigade took part in the Final Advance to Victory, notably in the Battles of the Hindenburg Line – Battle of the Beaurevoir Line (4 and 5 October), Battle of Cambrai (8 and 9 October), and Pursuit to the Selle (9 – 11 October) – and the Final Advance in Picardy – Battle of the Selle (17 – 25 October) and Battle of the Sambre (4 November).

=== Second World War ===
The brigade continued in existence throughout the interwar period, seeing numerous changes in its composition and eventually, in the late 1930s, leading to it being redesignated 7th Infantry Brigade (Guards). At the outbreak of the Second World War in September 1939, the 7th Infantry Brigade (Guards) (Note: The "Guards" subtitle was applied as all three constituent battalions were drawn from the Guards regiments.) was, once again, assigned to the 3rd Infantry Division, commanded at the time by Major-General Bernard Montgomery, in Southern Command. It was stationed at Pirbright Camp with the following units under command:

- 1st Battalion, Grenadier Guards
- 2nd Battalion, Grenadier Guards
- 1st Battalion, Coldstream Guards (at Chelsea Barracks, London)
- 7th Infantry Brigade (Guards) Anti-Tank Company

The brigade, commanded by Brigadier John Whitaker, moved to France with the rest of the 3rd Division on 30 September 1939 as part of the British Expeditionary Force (BEF) and remained there, serving alongside the French Army, until May 1940. It first saw action against the German Army's offensive in Belgium and France, notably on the Ypres-Comines Canal (26 – 28 May 1940) before being evacuated from Dunkirk to the United Kingdom by 1 June. On 15 September 1941, it was converted to the Guards Support Group.

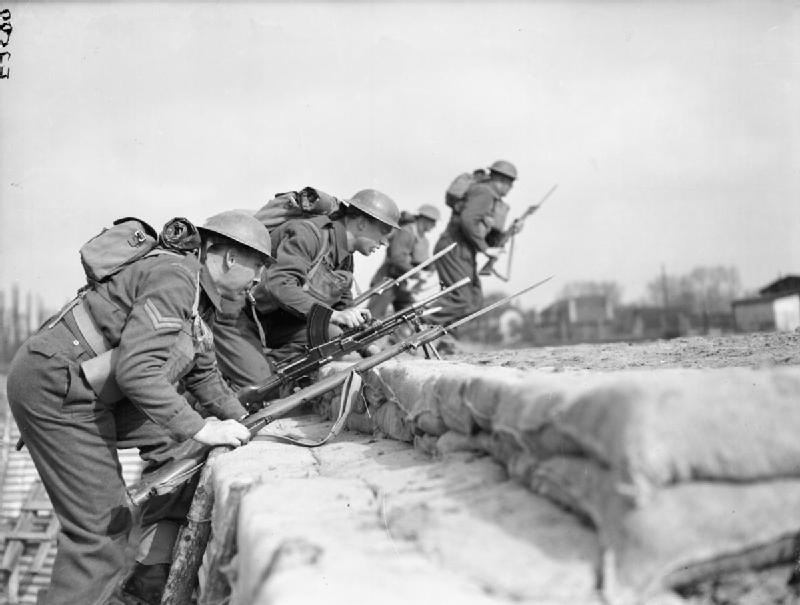
Guardsmen of King's Company, 1st Battalion, Grenadier Guards go 'over the top' during training at Annappes, France, 8 April 1940.

The 37th Infantry Brigade (originally in 12th (Eastern) Infantry Division) joined the 3rd Infantry Division on 27 November 1941 and on 8 December it was redesignated as 7th Infantry Brigade. At this time it commanded:

- 2nd Battalion, South Wales Borderers
- 2/6th Battalion, East Surrey Regiment
- 6th Battalion, Royal Sussex Regiment

The brigade served with the 9th Armoured Division from June 1942 until July 1944, when the division was disbanded, followed by the 47th Infantry (Reserve) Division from 10 September 1944 until August 1945. On 30 September 1944, it was reorganised as a reserve brigade whereupon it was redesignated as the 7th Infantry (Reserve) Brigade. The brigade remained in the United Kingdom throughout. By the end of the war, the brigade structure was:

- 13th Battalion, Queen's Royal Regiment (West Surrey)
- 12th Battalion, Royal Fusiliers
- 2/6th Battalion, East Surrey Regiment
- 2/4th Battalion, Essex Regiment

=== Cold War ===
Shortly after the end of the Second World War, the 7th Armoured Brigade was disbanded and the 22nd Armoured Brigade was re-designated as the 7th Armoured Brigade, based in Germany as part of the British Army of the Rhine (BAOR). After the 7th Armoured Division was disbanded in 1958, the 7th Armoured Brigade adopted its insignia and nickname, perpetuating the history of the famed division.

== 21st century ==
On 5 March 2013, the British Secretary of State for Defence, Philip Hammond, announced that the 7th Armoured Brigade would have its Challenger 2 tanks and heavy armoured battalions removed over the next decade. The Brigade itself was re-designated as the 7th Infantry Brigade and Headquarters East, but retain its famed 'Desert Rats' insignia. On 24 February 2015, the brigade formally stepped out of its armour role into that of an infantry brigade and regional point of command. At the same time, 49th (East) Brigade merged into 7th Infantry Brigade.

By January 2016 the brigade was moved from Germany to the UK, vacating its Camp Bergen-Hohne barracks.

Under the Future Soldier programme, the brigade was redesignated as the 7th Light Mechanised Brigade.

== Structure ==
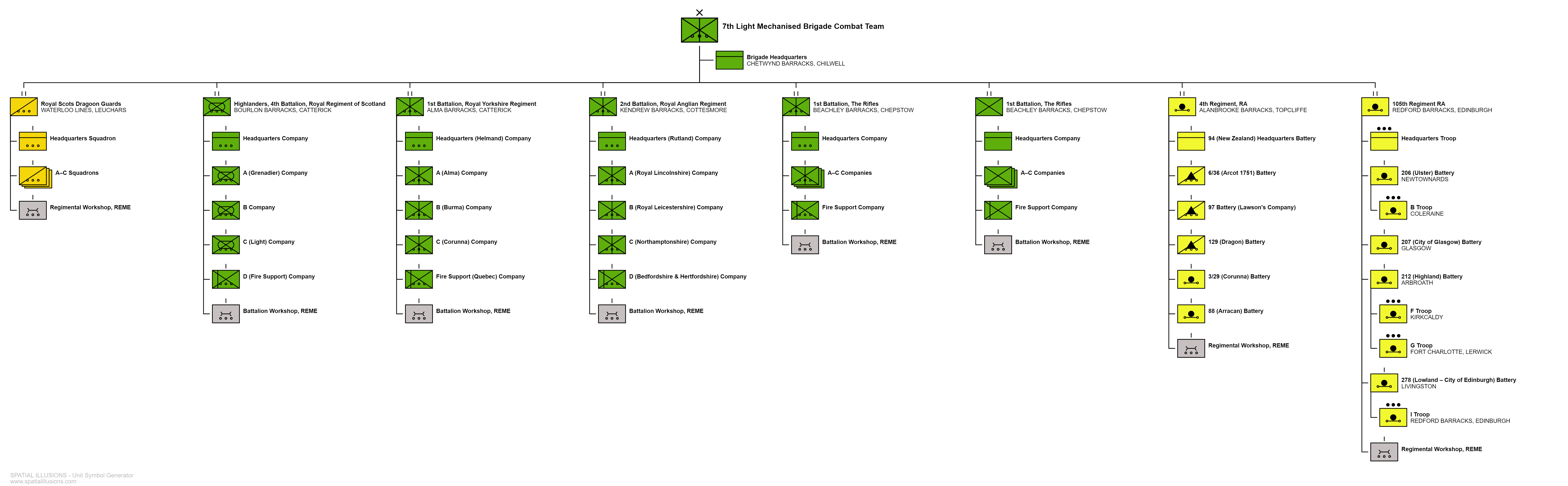
7th Infantry Brigade & HQ East Structure, as of July 2020.

=== 7th Light Mechanised Brigade ===
Units commanded by the brigade, which is based in Cottesmore, include:

- Royal Scots Dragoon Guards, in Leuchars with Jackal reconnaissance vehicles
- Scottish and North Irish Yeomanry, with Jackal reconnaissance vehicles (Army Reserve – paired with Royal Scots Dragoon Guards)
- 1st Battalion, Scots Guards, at Somme Barracks, Catterick Garrison
- 2nd Battalion (The Poachers), Royal Anglian Regiment, at Kendrew Barracks, Cottesmore
- 1st Battalion, Princess of Wales Royal Regiment, at Episkopi
- 1st Battalion, Royal Yorkshire Regiment, at Alma Lines, Catterick Garrison
- 4th Battalion The Royal Regiment of Scotland, in Catterick Garrison
- 4th Regiment Royal Artillery
- 105 Regiment Royal Artillery, (Army Reserve)
- 3 Medical Regiment Royal Army Medical Service
- 32 Engineer Regiment, Royal Engineers, at Marne Barracks, Catterick Garrison
- 6 Regiment, Royal Logistic Corps, at Dishforth Airfield, North Yorkshire
- 1 Close Support Battalion, Royal Electrical and Mechanical Engineers, at Meggido Lines, Catterick Garrison

== Commanding officers ==
The 7th Brigade had the following commanders from January 1906:

From	Rank	Name	Notes
January 1906	Brigadier-General	Hubert I.W. Hamilton	
October 1908	Brigadier-General	Laurence G. Drummond	
October 1912	Brigadier-General	Frederick W. N. McCracken	
23 November 1914	Brigadier-General	C.R. Ballard	
23 July 1915	Brigadier-General	C. Gosling	(wounded 1 May 1916)
1 May 1916	Lieutenant-Colonel	J.D. Crosbie	(acting)
8 May 1916	Brigadier-General	Charles Edensor Heathcote	
30 August 1916	Brigadier-General	C.C. Onslow	
9 August 1917	Lieutenant-Colonel	A.C. Johnston	(acting)
29 August 1917	Brigadier-General	C.J. Griffin	(wounded 29 May 1918)
29 May 1918	Brigadier-General	H.R. Headlam	(temporary)
31 May 1918	Brigadier-General	C.J. Hickie	
November 1919	Brigadier-General	Gwyn V. Hordern	
November 1923	Brigadier	George H.N. Jackson	
May 1927	Brigadier	Robert J. Collins	
February 1929	Brigadier	C. Clement Armitage	
July 1932	Brigadier	George M. Lindsay	
October 1934	Brigadier	William Platt	
November 1938	Brigadier	John A.C. Whitaker	
18 August 1940	Brigadier	Arnold de L. Cazenove	redesignated Guards Support Group, 15 September 1941
11 June 1940	Brigadier	Richard J.P. Wyatt	redesignated from 37th Infantry Brigade, 8 December 1941
14 February 1942	Brigadier	Walter H. Oxley	
1 June 1942	Brigadier	Basil B. Rackham	
10 August 1944	Colonel	D.M.W. Beak	(acting)
10 September 1944	Brigadier	David H. Haugh	

Brigade commander's car flag

Since being reformed from 7th Armoured Brigade in November 2014 commanders have been:

From	Rank	Name	Notes
December 2014	Brigadier	Jonathan Bourne	
September 2016	Brigadier	Charles Collins	
September 2018	Brigadier	Thomas Bewick	

== See also ==
- British Expeditionary Force (World War I)
- British Expeditionary Force (World War II)
- 7th Armoured Brigade
- 7th Armoured Division

== Bibliography ==
- Becke, Archibald F. (1935). Order of Battle of Divisions Part 1–The Regular British Divisions. London: HMSO. OCLC 4405016.
- Becke, Archibald F. (1938). Order of Battle of Divisions Part 3A. New Army Divisions (9–26). London: HMSO. OCLC 4405016.
- Frederick, J.B.M. (1984). Lineage Book of British Land Forces 1660–1978. Wakefield, Yorkshire: Microform Academic Publishers. ISBN 1-85117-009-X.
- James, Brigadier E.A. (1978). British Regiments 1914–18. London: Samson Books Limited. ISBN 0-906304-03-2.
- Joslen, H. F. (2003) [1960]. Orders of Battle: Second World War, 1939–1945. Uckfield, East Sussex: Naval and Military Press. ISBN 978-1-84342-474-1.
- Reid, Stuart (2004). Wellington's Army in the Peninsula 1809–14. Vol. 2 of Battle Orders Series. Oxford: Osprey Publishing. ISBN 1-84176-517-1.
