= Walter Oxley =

British military officer

Major-General Walter Oxley CB CBE MC
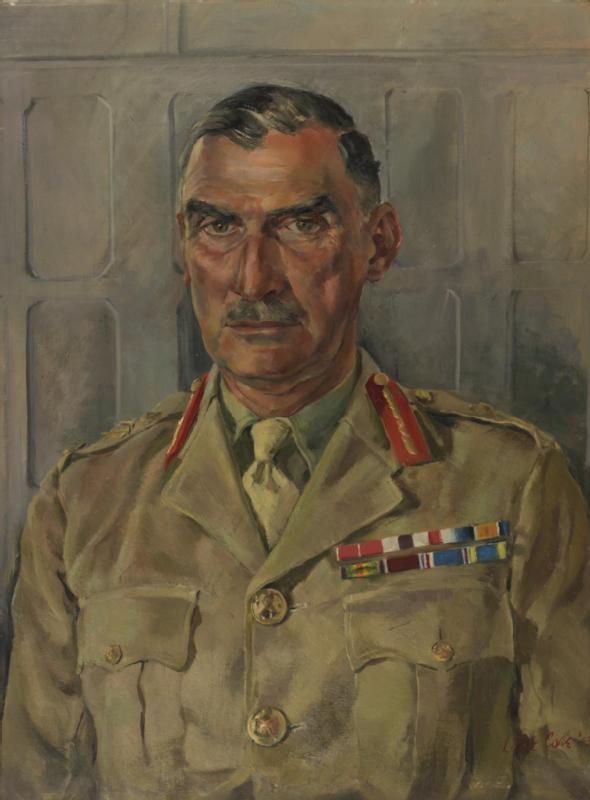
- Half-length portrait, 1943
- Born: 2 January 1891; London, England
- Died: 23 January 1978 (aged 87)
- Military career
- Allegiance: United Kingdom
- Branch: British Army
- Service years: 1911–1948
- Rank: Major-General
- Service number: 543
- Unit: Royal Engineers
- Commands: Malta (1943); 7th Infantry Brigade (1942); 232nd Infantry Brigade (1940–41)
- Conflicts: First World War; Second World War
- Awards: Companion of the Order of the Bath; Commander of the Order of the British Empire; Military Cross; Mentioned in Despatches

Major-General Walter Hayes Oxley, CB, CBE, MC (2 January 1891 – 23 January 1978) was a British Army officer who fought during the First and Second World Wars.

== Military career ==
Oxley was educated at Eastbourne College and the Royal Military Academy, Woolwich, from where he was commissioned into the Royal Engineers in July 1911. Later he was promoted to lieutenant in 1913. Oxley served in Egypt, on the Macedonian front and in Palestine and Egypt during the First World War.

Oxley attended the Staff College, Camberley, from 1925 to 1926, where the Australian Sydney Rowell was a classmate. He was promoted major in 1926 and lieutenant-colonel in 1931. Afterwards Oxley was military attaché at Belgrade, a post he held from May 1929 until 1932. Oxley was promoted colonel in 1934. In 1937 he was assistant adjutant and quartermaster-general for the British Military Mission to Egypt. Oxley became a local brigadier in 1939.

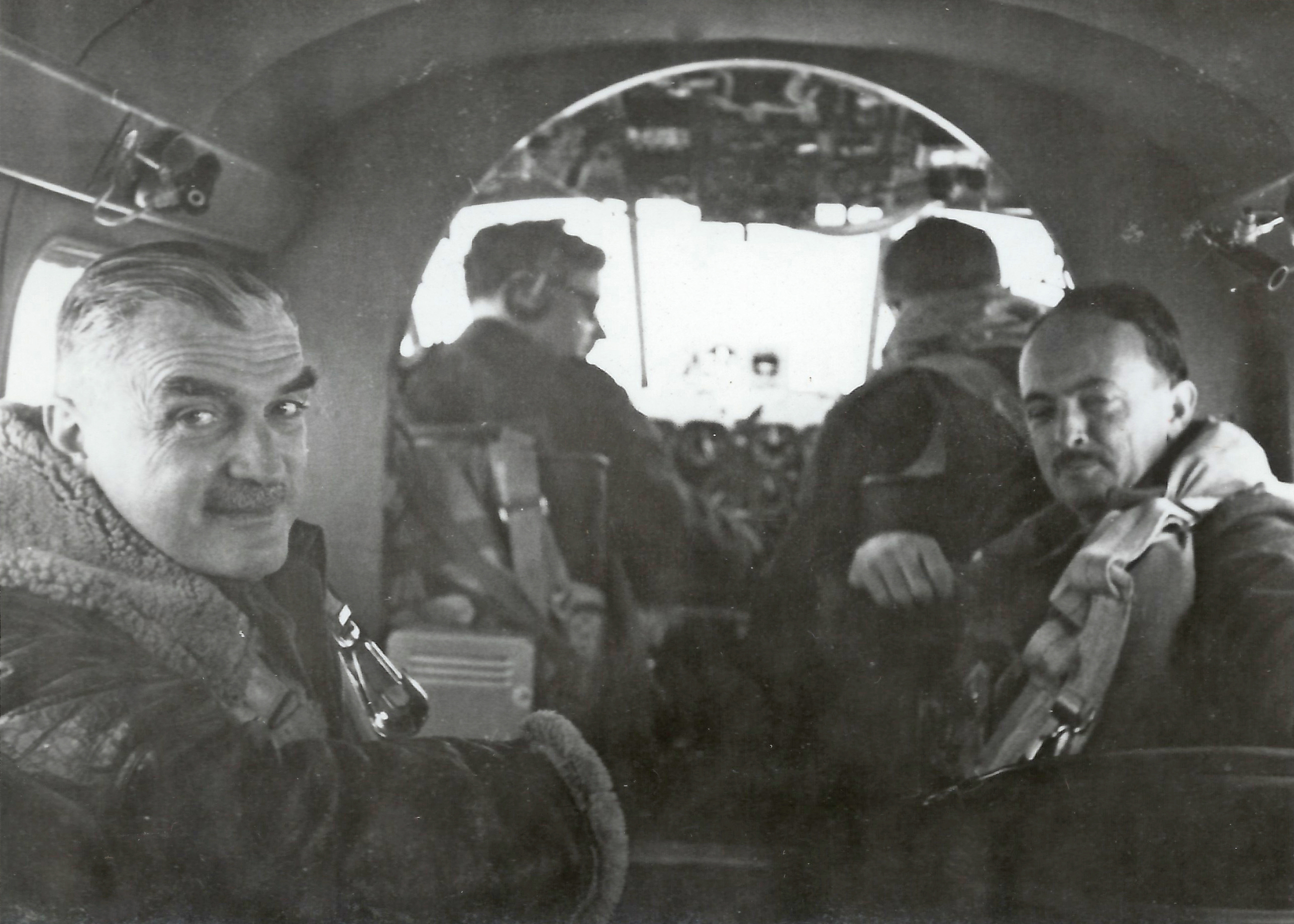
Major-General Oxley (left) flying to Sofia during his time with the Allied Control Commission.

Between 1939 and 1940, during the Second World War, Oxley was assistant adjutant and quartermaster-general in Malta and in 1940–1941 commanding officer of the Northern Brigade there. In 1942 Oxley served as commanding officer of the 7th Infantry Brigade. In 1942–1943 he was deputy director of military training in the War Office. During 1943–1944 he became a general officer commanding in Malta. During 1944–1947 Oxley served as a member of the Allied Control Commission in Bulgaria. He tried to resist the growing Soviet influence in the country, but did not receive support from London. In 1948 Oxley was retired. Afterwards he went to live in Charminster, near Dorchester, where he farmed.

== Bibliography ==
- Smart, Nick (2005). Biographical Dictionary of British Generals of the Second World War. Barnsley, South Yorkshire: Pen and Sword Books. ISBN 1844150496.

Military offices
| Preceded by Ronald Scobie | GOC Malta; March–August 1943 | Succeeded by William Robb |
