= William Robb (British Army officer) =

British Army general (1888–1961)

Major-General William Robb CBE DSO MC
- Born: 23 November 1888; Hexham, Northumberland, England
- Died: 27 March 1961 (aged 72); Matfen, Northumberland, England
- Military career
- Allegiance: United Kingdom
- Branch: British Army
- Service years: 1907–1946
- Rank: Major-General
- Service number: 14247
- Units: Northumberland Fusiliers; King's Own Yorkshire Light Infantry; North Staffordshire Regiment
- Commands: Malta Command (1944–45); North Wales District (1943–44); 73rd Independent Infantry Brigade (1941); Senior Officers' School, Sheerness (1940–41); 9th Infantry Brigade (1938–40); 2nd Battalion, North Staffordshire Regiment (1936–38); 1/4th Battalion, Northumberland Fusiliers (1918)
- Conflicts: First World War; Arab revolt in Palestine; Second World War
- Awards: Commander of the Order of the British Empire; Distinguished Service Order; Military Cross

Major-General William Robb, CBE, DSO, MC (23 November 1888 – 27 March 1961) was a senior British Army officer, who served in both the First and Second World Wars.

== Family background ==
Robb was born in Hexham, Northumberland, on 23 November 1888. The Robb family owned a successful department store business in Hexham. He was one of five children and all the male siblings would serve in the forces. All three of the Robb brothers (including William) would see service in the First World War as officers in the Northumberland Fusiliers; although one, James Milne Robb, would go on to join the Royal Air Force and rose to the rank of air vice marshal.

Robb was educated in Edinburgh at George Watson's College as a boarding scholar. He was a keen amateur cricketer and played minor counties cricket for Northumberland in 1912 and 1913, making two appearances in the Minor Counties Championship.

Robb married Nancy Chrystal Dodds in Hexham, Northumberland in 1916. They had one son William Walter Milroy Robb, who was born in 1919. After a lengthy absence from Northumberland during his career in the British Army, Robb returned to live in the county, in the village of Corbridge; although he died on 27 March 1961 in Matfen, Northumberland.

== Military career ==
=== Early career and First World War ===
Robb was commissioned into a militia battalion of the Northumberland Fusiliers on 8 January 1907; but he later transferred to the 4th Battalion of the Northumberland Fusiliers (a Territorial Force/TF unit) as a second lieutenant on 1 April 1908. He was promoted to lieutenant in June 1910. He was promoted to captain on 5 December 1912; serving with the battalion's D Company based at Prudhoe.

In 1914, following the outbreak of the First World War, Robb was mobilised with his battalion, and deployed to the Western Front in April 1915. The battalion formed part of the 149th (Northumberland) Brigade, itself part of the 50th (Northumbrian) Division. Robb was awarded the Military Cross whilst serving with the Northumberland Fusiliers. Whilst on the Western Front, Robb was recorded as an active and popular member of the 4th Battalion the Northumberland Fusiliers. He was even given temporary lieutenant colonel rank and commanded the battalion in the Battle of St Quentin on 21 March 1918; during this particularly fierce battle he was wounded and evacuated.

=== Between World Wars ===
After the war Robb accepted a regular commission in the King's Own Yorkshire Light Infantry (KOYLI). By 5 June 1920, Robb was a captain in the 2nd Battalion, KOYLI. The battalion would see service in India from April 1922 and Robb served with his family until 1925 when they returned on a troopship to England. Robb remained in India serving as a staff officer at the headquarters of Kohat District in 1926.

An Army List of 1938 recorded that Robb was commanding the 2nd Battalion, North Staffordshire Regiment and that he had been in post since 12 April 1936, having been promoted to lieutenant colonel on 1 July 1933. The battalion was then serving in Palestine during the Arab revolt in Palestine. One of Robb's officers was Major William Donovan Stamer, who would later go on to become a major-general and Colonel of the North Staffordshire Regiment.

=== Second World War ===
The August 1939 British Army List recorded Robb as promoted to colonel on 1 July 1936 and later in 1939 recorded as a temporary brigadier commanding an infantry brigade. In 1940 he was part of the ill-fated British Expeditionary Force, commanding the 9th Infantry Brigade (part of Bernard Montgomery's 3rd Infantry Division). In recognition of his performance during the retreat to Dunkirk and the evacuation of his brigade, Robb was awarded the Distinguished Service Order.

Shortly after returning from Dunkirk, Robb was given command of the Senior Officers' School at Sheerness, a post he held until March 1941 when he briefly took command of the 73rd Independent Infantry Brigade. From 19 May 1941 to August 1943, he was put in charge of part of the defence of South Wales (specifically the Severn Sub-area), and was appointed a Commander of the Order of the British Empire in 1943.

On 23 August 1943, Robb was granted the acting rank of major general. After the promotion he was posted to Malta as General Officer Commanding the army garrison on the islands, remaining in post until 1945. A popular military beach club in the Pembroke Army Garrison area was named after him – the Robb Lido (which was redeveloped as a commercial hotel complex overlooking St George's Bay).

=== Post-war ===
On 23 November 1946, Robb reached the age limit of liability to recall, and ceased to be held on the Reserve of Officers and was retired from the army; although he did take up the honorary post of regimental colonel of the KOYLI. He relinquished his post as regimental colonel of the KOYLI on 1 August 1950, a post he had held for three years.

== Bibliography ==
- Smart, Nick (2005). Biographical Dictionary of British Generals of the Second World War. Barnsley, South Yorkshire: Pen and Sword Books. ISBN 1844150496.

Military offices
Preceded by Robert Money	Commandant of the Senior Officers' School, Sheerness; 1940–1941	Succeeded by P. D. W. Dunn
Preceded by Walter Oxley	GOC Malta Command; 1943–1945	Succeeded by Kenneth Davidson
Honorary titles
Preceded by Sir Charles Deedes	Colonel of the King's Own Yorkshire Light Infantry; 1947–1950	Succeeded by Sir Harold Redman
