= Charles Armitage (British Army officer) =

British army officer

Brigadier Charles Armitage MC**
- Born: 24 December 1917; Huddersfield, West Yorkshire, England
- Died: 9 March 1998 (aged 80); Somerset, England
- Education: Royal Military Academy, Woolwich
- Spouse(s): Margaret McLeod (m. 1945, divorced) Ann Marguerite Mann (m. 1986)
- Relatives: General Charles Clement Armitage (father); Charles Ingram Armitage (grandfather); John Armitage (brother); Anne de Courcy (sister-in-law)
- Military career
- Allegiance: United Kingdom
- Branch: British Army
- Service years: 1937–1968
- Rank: Brigadier
- Service number: 73009
- Unit: Royal Artillery
- Commands: Chief Instructor at Mons Officer Cadet School; Royal Armoured Corps, Gunnery School, Bovington (1959–1961); North East District, Royal Armoured Corps (1966–1968)
- Conflicts: Second World War: Battle of France; North African Campaign; Italian campaign; Operation Overlord
- Awards: Military Cross & Two Bars

Brigadier Charles Armitage, MC & Two Bars (24 December 1917 – 9 March 1998) was a senior British Army officer.

Charles was educated at Eton College and then from there the Royal Military Academy, Woolwich where he would be commissioned into the Royal Artillery in 1937 as a second lieutenant. His horsemanship would also earn him the "Saddle" award from the academy. He was promoted to lieutenant in 1940.

During the Second World War he saw action at Sidi Barrani (December 1940) in which his artillery command supported the 8th Hussars, earning his first Military Cross. Later in November 1941, he saw combat in a light tank observation post, saving the crew of a tank which had been disabled, thus earning his first bar to his Military Cross. It was not long after when he received his second bar to his Military Cross during the defense of Tobruk (April - October 1941), where Armitage rallied together a troop of soldiers, coordinated artillery and gathered intelligence from an exposed observation mast. In July 1942, at the First Battle of El Alamein leading "E" Battery, Royal Horse Artillery he would be seriously wounded causing him to be confined to a hospital in Cairo for six months. He recovered and went on to serve in the Italian campaign and Operation Overlord.

Immediately after the war Armitage went on to serve with the 2nd Dragoon Guards ("The Bays") from 1945-1958 after transferring from the Royal Artillery. He also for a period of time was the chief instructor at the Mons Officer Cadet School. He also was in command of the Royal Armoured Corps, Gunnery School at Bovington Camp in 1959-1961. Armitage also acted as Deputy Commander of the Aldershot Garrison from February 1963 to November 1965. After this, his last post in the British Army was as a Brigadier in the Royal Armoured Corps (1966 to 1968).

In his retirement from the Army, he settled at Bremhill Wick Farm, Wiltshire. He spent the majority of his time officiating at the Badminton Horse Trials for twenty-five years as well as serving on the Beaufort Hunt Committee for twenty-one years. He died on 9 March 1998 aged 80.

== Early life ==
Charles was son of General Clement Armitage and his wife Hilda Caroline Armitage (née Hirst) on 24 December 1917 in Huddersfield, West Yorkshire.

At the age of 13 in September 1931, Charles' mother, Hilda Armitage, would pass away in a horse accident. He retold the event at the time stating that they started their ride at about 10:00 AM and were crossing a recreation ground close to their home when his mother's horse fell on its side. An inquest later deemed that Hilda died of a fractured skull caused by the incident.

== Military career ==
=== Pre-war ===
Charles attended the Royal Military Academy, Woolwich in 1937. In an interview in his later life, he recounted:

Well the Royal Military Academy Woolwich. It was called the 'Shop.' I hated it. I mean I really loathed my time there. It was purgatory. But in retrospect, by golly, it did a good job, it produced the right article and engrained in you a sense of duty, a sense of military duty. Absolutely where it became second nature and so, when under extreme stress and fatigue, you might have been tempted to waver or to do the wrong thing, the Shop had inculcated in me, anyway, and I am sure in others, a sort of automatic response which made one do the right thing and although, I didn't enjoy it at the time, I realise now that it did produce in me, at any rate, the right article.

Although he did not speak highly of his time at Woolwich, it was at this military academy he would be awarded the Saddle award for his "fine horsemanship." Once finishing at Woolwich he was commissioned into the 9th Field Regiment, Royal Artillery.

=== Second World War ===
==== North Africa Campaign ====
Following the Dunkirk Evacuation in 1940, Armitage began a posting in the Middle East in July 1940, attached to "E" Troop 1 Regiment Royal Horse Artillery. He soon distinguished himself at the Battle of Sidi Barrani in December 1940, earning his first Military Cross. Armitage's citation praised his “outstanding skill” which contributed to a “high standard of military efficiency”. Ordered to support 8 Hussars in an attack on an enemy position just South of the Salt Lake, Armitage, as the principle commander directing the artillery fire, delivered accurate and quick fire that prevented the enemy from returning fire as the Hussars advanced. The lack of casualties bore "testimony to the skill of his command." In a letter to his father, General Clement Armitage, Charles described the chaotic prelude to the battle, nothing that the 4th Armoured Brigade was unaware of the enemy's advance until 150 enemy tanks, preceded by a "seething mass of vehicles" suddenly crested the horizon. He recounted how the 8th Hussars, caught unprepared on a forward slope with no cover, fought valiantly despite being "assailed from three sides" with barely time to start their engines. A cavalryman later remarked, “If you found yourself in front of Charles (Armitage), you knew that you were behind enemy lines” highlighting his boldness in the thick of battle. For his actions, Armitage was gazetted for his first Military Cross on 25 April 1941.

Almost a year after he received his first decoration he would also receive his bar to his Military Cross on the night of 22 November 1941 to the morning of 23 November 1941. On the first evening he spent the better part of the entire day in his light tank observation post, providing support to tanks of 32 Army Tank Brigade. He was described as being “everywhere things were hottest and support was needed.” One example of this was when he spent more than two hours in close proximity to a tank which had been blown up on a mine 150 yards from an enemy position; Armitage managed to hold off the enemy who were attempting to prevent recovery of the exploded tank and its crew. The next morning on 23 November there was another instance of this whereby, still manning his light tank O.P., he stayed with two armored cars which had been knocked out. Providing covering fire for one and a half hours whilst also simultaneously managing to relay a message back to his Battery Commander which led to two other tanks coming up to help evacuate wounded men, Armitage himself rescuing three individuals. The Bar to the Military Cross was gazetted on 24 February 1942.

His final wartime decoration of the Second Bar to the Military Cross would be for his combined efforts in the defense of Tobruk between April – October 1941. In his citation he was described similarly to his two previous citations as being “continuously in action.” This characteristic of his drew some attention to himself when the Germans managed to successfully attack Nedauuar Hill this in turn led to many of the allied troops becoming disorganized; Armitage, never being too far away from the action, managed to rally the troops and allow for them to reconsolidate. Further to this, he also participated in “several successful infantry attacks on the El Adem road position” Armitage coordinating and allowing for the “most accurate and effective artillery support.” His “keenness” also allowed for several high observation post masts to be erected in the Pilastrino sector which looked directly down into the enemy position; One flaw of this masts was that they were susceptible to persistent and accurate enemy shelling, which due to the flimsiness of the masts, led to them being routinely destroyed. Armitage however, despite the possible risk was described as spending “much time in them, with a remote control line, firing at enemy parties and obtaining much valuable detailed information.” The citation concludes “his great coolness, combined with efficiency, when under fire, is a fine example to all.”

In July 1942 during the First Battle of El Alamein, then Major Armitage, as battery commander of 'E' Battery, 1 Royal Horse Artillery, led a critical defense on an indistinct ridge south of Ruweisat Ridge. On 3 July, his 'Gardiner' Troop, comprising four 25-pounder guns, faced a fierce assault by approximately twenty German tanks, without immediate tank support. Directing fire from No. 1 gun, Armitage employed 'gun control' tactics, enabling his officers to engage the enemy at 1,500 - 2,000 yards despite sand clouds obscuring visibility. His leadership resulted in the destruction of two enemy tanks, but as ammunition began to deplete, while moving to the Troop Command Post to take an "unusual" sip of whisky, he spotted an antenna slowly rising over Ruweisat Ridge Armitage called out to his battery position, "Watch out! To the right!" At that moment, an explosive shell landed in front of his feet, and a splinter shattered his jaw and lodged in his throat. Despite this, his prior organization ensured 'Gardiner' Troop repelled the attack, forcing the German withdrawal and leaving a total of five tanks disabled. Senior officers praised the action, with an eyewitness, R. I. Cunningham, noting that "Major Armitage's forward troop had saved the brigade," a sentiment echoed by the King's Royal Rifle Corps historian who credited 'E' Battery with halting the German advance, a pivotal moment in the campaign. His injuries resulted in him being hospitalized in Cairo for around six months, he was unable to speak for several weeks because a splinter from the shell had damaged his vocal cords.

==== Operation Overlord ====
===== Operation Market Garden =====
Although not involved directly with the parachute element of the operation Armitage still found himself not far away from the action. On the morning of 21 September 1944 Lieutenant-Colonel Loder-Symonds and Major-General Urquhart as well as a Lieutenant-Colonel Thompson visited 1st Light Battery's Headquarters. Thompson saw a Captain speaking to the CRA (Commander Royal Artillery) talking over a radio the Captain passed the CRA the microphone and head-set before speaking "Yes, and my Christian name is Robert" the tense atmosphere was quickly elated when a reply was received "Yes, Armitage, Charles Armitage!" the CRA turned to Urquhart and announced that they were through by wireless to 64 Medium Regiment. This wireless conversation had resulted from the efforts of the 64 Medium Regiment to establish the identity of the Light Regiment's Headquarters beyond all doubt; to do this their Adjutant had asked the CRA whether he had a friend called Charles (Armitage) from an old regiment who now happened to be Brigade Major, Royal Artillery at 11 Armoured Division. The 64 Medium Regiment/ Corps Artillery provided what was described as astonishing accuracy on to targets despite being at an extreme range. This line of communication was the only communication between the Division and XXX Corps.

===== Later actions in North-West Europe =====
During a battle in which the 11 Armoured Division supported the 3rd Division, Major Robin Dunn observed an incident involving Brigadier Bryan "Frizz" Fowler, the Commander Royal Artillery (CRA) of 11 Armoured Division, and Armitage, his Brigade Major. Fowler was pacing outside and repeatedly interrupting Armitage, who was communicating via wireless. Frustrated, Charles, then a lieutenant (war substantive captain) remarked, "Why don't you shut up, Frizz? Can't you see I'm fighting a battle?" This retort silenced Fowler, who turned on his heel and said no more, despite his evident anger.

=== Post-war career ===
==== "The Bays" ====
On 28 June 1950 (with seniority 26 August 1945) he transitioned from the Royal Artillery to "The Bays" otherwise known as the 2nd Dragoon Guards (Queen's Bays). Early into his time with the regiment he commanded a squadron of Centurion tanks. Shortly after he would be promoted from Captain to Major on 26 August 1950. Whilst stationed in Bad Fallingbostel, Germany with the regiment he also founded the Wessex Hounds it was said that the German farmers were "surprisingly tolerant" of British Army Officers hunting over their land. He was later promoted to Lieutenant colonel whilst serving with the unit on 9 November 1955. He would be credited for attempting to recreate polo in the regiment with twenty-three officers playing polo from 1955 to 1957 using Arab ponies as the unit moved from Jordan to Sabratha, Libya. In his later life (December 1995) he would go on to commission a painting of "The Farewell Parade" to give to the Regiment something which he noted "I ought to have done 37 years ago!" Alongside this painting, Armitage would also have some prints made which he distributed to his former colleagues who he served with in "The Bays." The painting was produced by Jock Gibson.

==== Gunnery School ====
At the Royal Armoured Corps Gunnery School, where Armitage acted as Commandant (1959 – 1961), he initiated the Ministry of Defence's work, studying gun accuracy in particular which was an area of interest for him when he was with "The Bays" in Libya. The contributions he made in this position in turn led to the adoption of thermal lagging on gun barrels and small mirrors on the muzzle, which, as of 1998, was still being used by the armed forces.

==== Aldershot Garrison ====
In February 1963, he succeeded Brigadier Jack d'Avigdor-Goldsmid as Deputy Commander of the Aldershot Garrison. During his tenure, he participated in numerous events, often taking the salute at march pasts involving army cadets or junior military units, which generally proceeded smoothly. However, on 31 May 1963, during an inspection of the Bloxham School Combined Cadet Force, twelve of the 246 cadets on parade fainted due to the heat. Despite noticeable gaps in the ranks by the end of the inspection, he commended their performance, stating, "Their bearing and steadiness were remarkable in view of the heat, and I was impressed by the march past." A more successful parade occurred on 15 December 1964 at St. Omer Barracks, Aldershot, where 300 members of the ACC Junior Tradesmen’s Regiment participated. He praised the event as "an excellent turnout." He would serve in this position until November 1965.

His final position within the armed forces would be as a Brigadier of the North East District, Royal Armoured Corps (March 1966 – 1968).

Armitage retired from the British Army on 1 February 1968. During his military career he had a total of three tanks "shot out from under him."

== Private life ==
Charles married Margaret McLeod (widow to Major R. P. Hodson-Mackenzie) on 30 November 1945. He divorced Margaret "Peggy" McLeod and went on to marry Ann Marguerite Mann (née Brockbank) on 19 February 1986 in Newbury, Berkshire. He had no children.

After his army career he settled at Bremhill Wick Farm, Wiltshire it was here where he spent the rest of his life enjoying hunting, country pursuits and local affairs. Armitage also served on the Beaufort Hunt Committee for twenty-one years as well as officiating at the Badminton Horse Trials for twenty-five years.

In his later life Armitage contributed to Wolf Heckmann's "Rommel's Krieg in Afrika" book by retelling some of his wartime stories and experiences with the journalist; Armitage mentioned at the end of his meeting with Heckmann that "Thirty years ago, I would never have believed I'd be talking so amicably with one of you (Germans). It gives one a bit of hope, doesn't it?"

Charles died on 9 March 1988 aged 80, his service was held on 20 March 1998 at St. Martin's Church, Bremhill.

== Honours and awards ==
- Military Cross (UK, 25 April 1941)
- Bar to the Military Cross (UK, 24 February 1942)
- Second Bar to the Military Cross (UK, 14 April 1942)

== Bibliography ==
- Heckmann, Wolf (1999). Rommels Krieg in Afrika: Wüstenfüchse gegen Wüstenratten (in German). Bergisch Gladbach: Bastei Lübbe (published 1 January 1999). ISBN 978-3704350275.
- Mann, Michael (1993). The Regimental History of 1st Queen's Dragoon Guards. Michael Russell Publishing Ltd. ISBN 978-0859551892.
- Willett, Peter (2015). Armoured Horseman: With the Bays and Eight Army in North Africa and Italy. Pen & Sword Books (published 30 May 2015). ISBN 978-1473857438.
- Dunn, Robin (1993). Sword and the Wig: Memoirs of a Lord Justice. Quiller Press. ISBN 978-1870948883.
- Faunce-Brown, Michael (2014). Blowing My Own Trumpet. Paragon Publishing (published 27 October 2014). ISBN 978-1782223405.

Military offices
Preceded by Jack d'Avigdor-Goldsmid	Deputy Commander, Aldershot Garrison; 1963-1965	Succeeded by Percy W P Green
Preceded by William C W Sloan	Brigadier, Royal Armoured Corps, North East District; 1966-1968	Succeeded by Post abolished
