= Arthur Cazenove =

English cricketer

Personal information
- Full name: Arthur Cazenove
- Born: 12 February 1823; Clapton, Middlesex, England
- Died: 10 August 1893 (aged 70); Cranborne, Dorset, England
- Batting: Unknown
- Bowling: Unknown-arm roundarm medium

Domestic team information
- Years: Team
- 1851–1853: Oxford University

Arthur Cazenove (12 February 1823 – 10 August 1893) was an English cricketer and clergyman.

The son of Philip Cazenove, the founder of the stockbrokers Cazenove, and Emma Knapp, he was born at Clapton in February 1823. He later studied at Exeter College, Oxford. While studying at Oxford, he played for Oxford University from 1851 to 1853, making seven appearances. He scored 129 runs in his seven matches, at an average of 16.12 and a high score of 37 not out. With his roundarm medium pace bowling, he took 15 wickets.

After graduating from Oxford, Cazenove took holy orders in the Church of England. His first ecclesiastical posting was as vicar of St Mark's Church in Reigate. He later held the post of honorary canon of Rochester Cathedral. He married Letitia Georgiana Thomson in 1856, with the couple having three children. Cazenove died in August 1893 at Cranborne, Dorset. His grandson was the soldier Arnold Cazenove and his great-grandson was the actor Christopher Cazenove.
