= Kenneth Loch =

British Army general

Lieutenant-General Sir Kenneth Loch KCIE KBE CB MC
- Loch in 1941
- Born: 18 September 1890
- Died: 9 January 1961 (aged 70)
- Military career
- Allegiance: United Kingdom
- Branch: British Army
- Service years: 1910–1947
- Rank: Lieutenant-General
- Service number: 22281
- Unit: Royal Artillery
- Conflicts: First World War; Second World War
- Awards: Knight Commander of the Order of the Indian Empire; Knight Commander of the Order of the British Empire; Companion of the Order of the Bath; Military Cross; Mentioned in Despatches (2)

Lieutenant-General Sir Kenneth Morley Loch, KCIE, KBE, CB, MC (18 September 1890 – 9 January 1961) was a senior British Army officer and defence planner.

== Early life and military career ==
Born on 18 September 1890, Loch was educated at Wellington College, Berkshire, and the Royal Military Academy, Woolwich, and, upon passing out from the latter, received a commission as a second lieutenant into the Royal Artillery on 23 December 1910. He saw action during the First World War at the retreat from Mons and the battles of the Marne and Aisne, all in 1914. Leaving the front lines in 1916 he became an instructor in gunnery at the School of Instruction for the Royal Horse Artillery and the Royal Field Artillery until he returned to front line service in the Italian Campaign of 1918. During the war Loch was twice mentioned in despatches and received the Military Cross.

== Between the wars ==
Between the wars Loch remained in the army and attended the Staff College, Camberley, from 1923 to 1924. His fellow students included numerous future general officers, such as Dudley Johnson, John Smyth, Arthur Wakely, Montagu Stopford, Arthur Percival, Douglas Henry Pratt, Robert Stone, John Halsted, Frederick Pile, Michael Gambier-Parry, Colville Wemyss, Robert Pargiter, Edmond Schreiber, Alastair MacDougall, Roderic Petre, Balfour Hutchison, Leslie Hill and Gordon Macready. He was involved in air defence preparations for Britain around the British Empire. From 1926 to 1929 he was a General Staff Officer Grade 2 (GSO2) to the Territorial Army Air Defence Formations, and from 1932 to 1935 an instructor at the Staff College, Quetta; GSO2 at the War Office, 1935–1937, and GSO1, Royal Air Force (RAF) Fighter Command, 1937–1938.

== Second World War ==
From the beginning of the Second World War until 1941, Loch was Director of Anti-Aircraft and Coastal Defence, first as acting major-general, then from 25 November 1940 as temporary major-general. He argued successfully against the use of chemical weapons in case of a German invasion of Britain (see Operation Sea Lion). After a three-year tour of inspection of anti-aircraft defences in the British Empire (a Special Employment), he became Master-General of Ordnance, India, from 1944 until his retirement in 1947. After retiring the service Loch was with the British Council from 1947 to 1948, then served as a member of the Control Commission for Germany, 1948–1949, and returned to the British Council from 1950 to 1958. He was also Chairman of Governors of Wellington College.

In 1929 Loch married Monica Joan Estelle Ruffer, the daughter of a German banker, and had two sons. He was also the uncle of the Labour Member of Parliament Tam Dalyell.

== Sources ==
- Smart, Nick (2005). Biographical Dictionary of British Generals of the Second World War. Barnesley: Pen & Sword. ISBN 1844150496.

Military offices
Preceded by Clarence Bird	Master-General of the Ordnance (India); 1944−1947	Succeeded by Post disbanded
