= Whitaker baronets =

Baronetcy in the Baronetage of the United Kingdom

The Whitaker Baronetcy, of Babworth in the County of Nottingham, is a title in the Baronetage of the United Kingdom. It was created on 15 July 1936 for Albert Edward Whitaker. He was a colonel in the army and served as a justice of the peace, deputy lieutenant and high sheriff for Nottinghamshire. The second baronet was a major general in the Coldstream Guards.

The Labour politician Benjamin Whitaker was the brother of the third baronet.

== Whitaker baronets, of Babworth (1936) ==
- Sir Albert Edward Whitaker, 1st Baronet (1860–1945)
- Sir John Albert Charles Whitaker, 2nd Baronet (1897–1957)
- Sir James Herbert Ingham Whitaker, 3rd Baronet (1925–1999)
- Sir John James Ingham Whitaker, 4th Baronet (born 1952)

The heir apparent to the baronetcy is Harry James Ingham Whitaker (born 1984), only son of the 4th Baronet.
