= Senior Officers' School, Belgaum =

- Active: 1920-1939
- Country: United Kingdom
- Branch: British Indian Army
- Type: Training
- Role: Senior Army Officer Training
- Garrison/HQ: Belgaum, India

Commanders
- Notable commanders: William Slim, 1st Viscount Slim

The Senior Officers' School, Belgaum was a British military establishment established in 1920 for the training of senior officers of all services based in India in inter-service cooperation.

== History ==
The School was originally intended for senior officers of the Indian Army who aspired to battalion command and to ensure that all such candidates received suitable training. The School attempted to widen officers' outlook by including in its syllabus subjects that were not immediately military but led to an appreciation of the wider political, geographical and technological environment in which the Army would operate. The first commandant was Brigadier-General Henry Edward ap Rhys Pryce, who was appointed in December 1920, and the last commandant was Brigadier William Slim, who was appointed in June 1939, shortly before the school closed in September, due to the outbreak of the Second World War in Europe.

There was also a parallel establishment, the Senior Officers' School, Sheerness, at Sheerness in England.

== Commandants ==
The following officers commanded the school during its existence:

- Brigadier-General Henry E. ap R. Pryce: December 1920 – August 1924
- Brigadier-General H.B. Douglas Baird: August 1924 – June 1928
- Brigadier Clifton I. Stockwell: June 1928 – July 1930
- Brigadier S. John P. Scobell: August 1930 – April 1932
- Brigadier Martin Kemp-Welch: April 1932 – July 1935
- Brigadier Alfred H. Evans-Gwynne: July 1935 – January 1937
- Brigadier Daril G. Watson: January 1937 – June 1939
- Brigadier William J. Slim: June–September 1939
