= Andrew Wilson Baird =

Scottish tidal surveyor (1842–1908)

Colonel Andrew Wilson Baird CSI, FRS
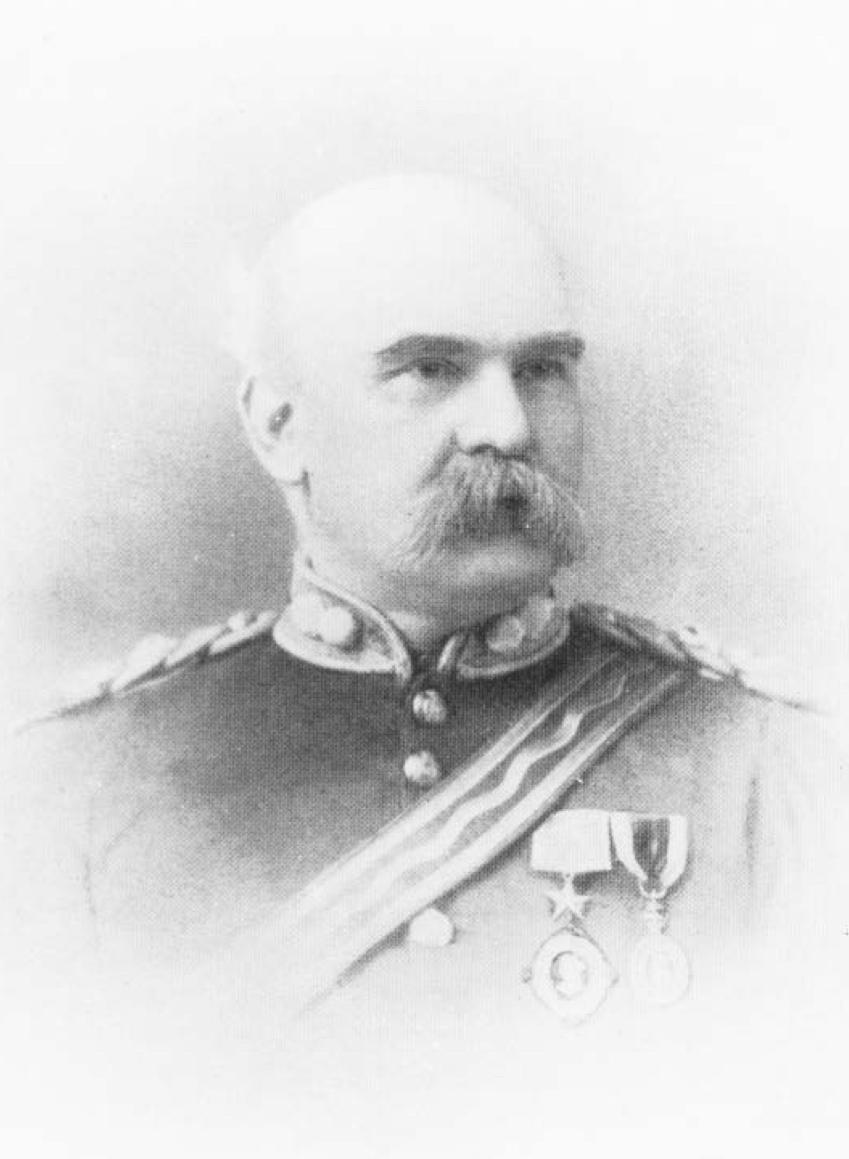
- Colonel Andrew Wilson Baird, CSI, FRS
- Born: 26 April 1842; Aberdeen, Scotland
- Died: 2 April 1908 (aged 65); London, England
- Burial place: Highgate Cemetery, London
- Spouse: Margaret Elizabeth Davidson
- Relatives: Sir Douglas Baird (son)
- Military career
- Allegiance: United Kingdom
- Branch: British Army
- Service years: 1861–1897
- Rank: Colonel
- Unit: Royal Engineers
- Conflicts: Abyssinian Expedition
- Awards: CSI (1897); FRS (1885)
- Other work: Survey of India; Calcutta Mint

Andrew Wilson Baird, CSI, FRS (26 April 1842 – 2 April 1908) was a Scottish colonel of the Royal Engineers. He is best remembered for his work in tidal studies of the coast of India.

== Life ==
Born and baptised 26 April 1842 in Aberdeen, he was the eldest son of Thomas Baird of Woodlands, Cults, and Catherine Imray. He was educated at Marischal College, Aberdeen, before entering the Military College of the East India Company at Addiscombe in June 1860. Joining the Royal Military Academy at Woolwich in January 1861, he was made a lieutenant in the Royal Engineers the following year, and sailed for India on 1 March 1864.

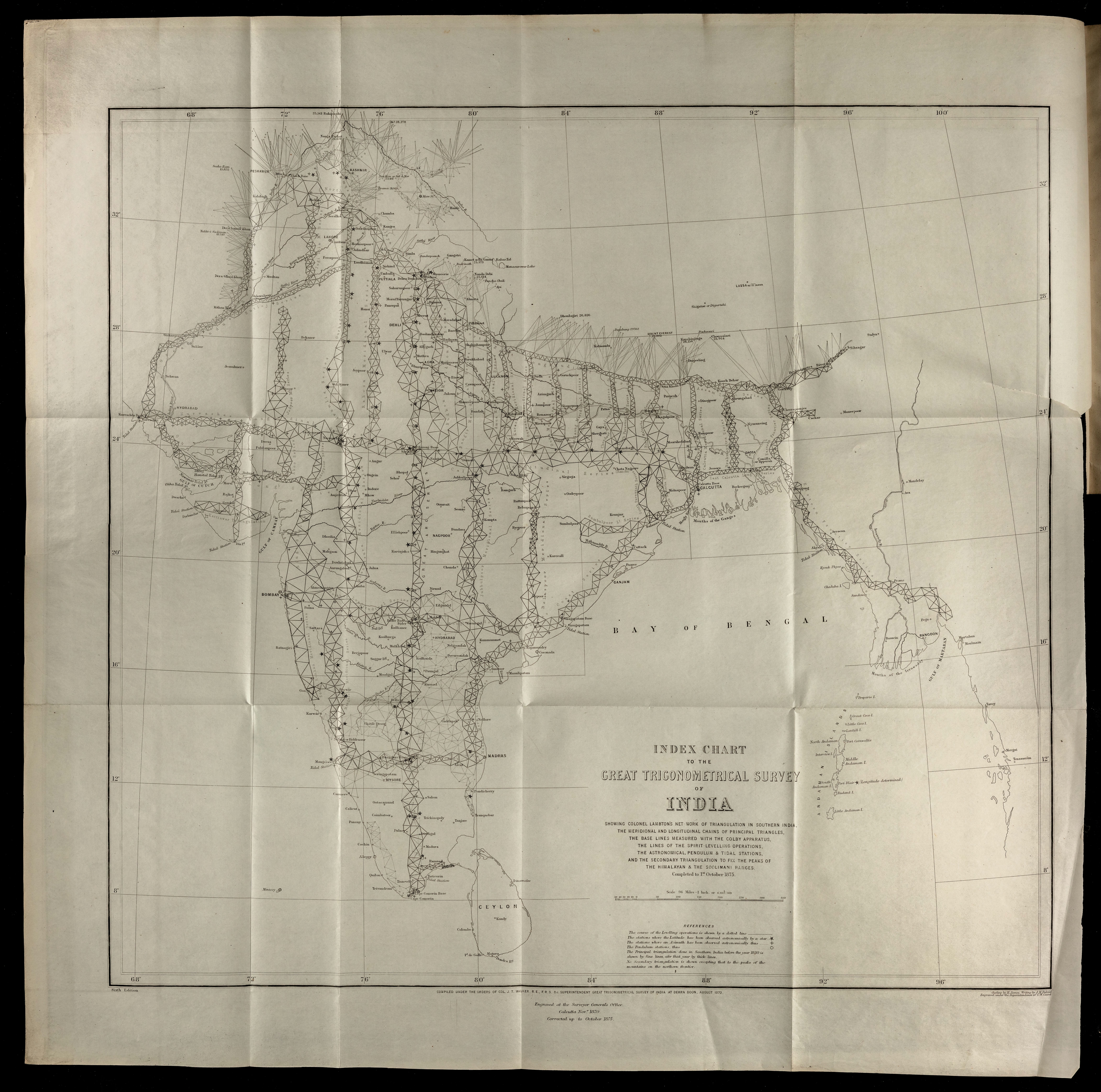
Map of the Great Trigonometrical Survey of India, where Baird served as Assistant Superintendent.

In India he was appointed special assistant engineer of the Bombay harbour defence works, and was responsible for ordering the buildings of the batteries at Oyster Rock and Middle Ground. During the Abyssinian expedition of 1868 under Sir Robert Napier, Baird served as assistant field engineer and held the post of traffic manager for the military railway constructed across the Zula plain, for which he was mentioned in despatches.

In December 1869, Baird was appointed assistant superintendent of the Great Trigonometrical Survey of India. He worked on triangulation in Kathiawar and Gujarat before focusing on extensive tidal observations at the Gulf of Cutch, where he investigated the changing relationships between land and sea levels. He briefly returned to England in 1870 due to ill health but returned to continue his work. In 1881, he was selected as a delegate to the International Congress of Geography in Venice, where he was awarded a gold medal for his exhibits on tidal apparatus.

His work led to a significant collaboration with George Darwin on the harmonic analysis of tidal data, resulting in a joint report in 1885. Baird subsequently authored the Manual for Tidal Observations (1886), which became a standard text in the field. He notably recorded the tidal disturbances caused by the 1883 eruption of Krakatoa. During this period, he worked closely with Edward Roberts of the Nautical Almanac Office to ensure the Indian data was successfully applied to the first mechanical tide-predicting machines. He was promoted to captain on 4 April 1874 and a major on 18 December 1881.

Between July 1885 and August 1889, he headed the mints at Calcutta and Bombay, until he was appointed the permanent mint master at Calcutta on 12 August. During his tenure, he reorganized the manufacturing department and oversaw the withdrawal of worn coinage from circulation. He was appointed a colonel on 9 April 1896, and retired from the mint the following year, receiving the special thanks of the Governor-General for his services. He made his home at Palmers Cross, near Elgin, Moray.

In 1885, he was elected a Fellow of the Royal Society and appointed CSI in the 1897 Diamond Jubilee Honours.

== Family ==
In 1872, Baird married Margaret Elizabeth Davidson, daughter of Charles Davidson of Forrester Hill, Aberdeen. They had two sons and five daughters. His son Sir Douglas Baird went on to become a General in the Indian Army.

He died of heart failure on 2 April 1908 and was buried on the eastern side of Highgate Cemetery. His grave (no.37143) has no headstone or marker.

== Works ==
- Baird, A. W. (1872). Notes on the Harmonic Analysis of Tidal Observations. Great Trigonometrical Survey of India.
- Darwin, G. H.; Baird, A. W. (1885). "Report on the Harmonic Analysis of Tidal Observations". Report of the British Association for the Advancement of Science: 33–60.
- Baird, A. W. (1886). Manual for Tidal Observations. Taylor and Francis.
