= Edwin Atkinson =

British Army general (1867–1947)

Lieutenant-general Sir Edwin Henry de Vere Atkinson KBE CB CMG CIE
- Born: 19 February 1867; Allahabad, Uttar Pradesh
- Died: 1 April 1947 (aged 80); Kensington, London
- Military career
- Allegiance: United Kingdom
- Branch: British Army
- Rank: Lieutenant-general
- Conflicts: World War I
- Awards: Knight Commander of the Order of the British Empire; Companion of the Order of the Bath; Companion of the Order of St Michael and St George; Companion of the Order of the Indian Empire

Lieutenant-general Sir Edwin Henry de Vere Atkinson (19 February 1867 – 1 April 1947) KBE CB CMG CIE was a senior British Army officer who became Master-General of the Ordnance in India.

== Military career ==
Educated at Charterhouse School and the Royal Military Academy, Woolwich, Atkinson was commissioned into the Royal Engineers on 16 September 1885.

He was appointed principal of the Thomason Engineering College at Roorkee, India in 1901. He saw service in the First World War, becoming Commander Royal Engineers, 38th (Welsh) Infantry Division in September 1915, Chief Engineer, I Corps in summer 1916 and Chief Engineer, First Army in November 1917.

After the war, he became General Officer Commanding Poona District in July 1920, Engineer-in-Chief, India in 1921 and Master-General of the Ordnance in India in April 1924 before retiring in April 1930.

He was appointed a Companion of the Order of St Michael and St George on 1 January 1917, a Companion of the Order of the Bath on 1 January 1918 and a Knight Commander of the Order of the British Empire on 7 February 1921.

== Works ==
- Text-book of practical solid geometry, etc., for the use of the Royal Military Academy, Woolwich. E. & F. N. Spon. 1899.
- Report on the enquiry to bring technical institutions into closer touch and more practical relations with the employers of labour in India. Superintendent Government Printers. 1912.

Military offices
Preceded by New post	Master-General of the Ordnance (India); 1924−1930	Succeeded by Bertram Kirwan
