= Bertram Kirwan =

British Army general (1871–1960)

Lieutenant-general Sir Bertram Richard Kirwan KCB CMG
- Born: 17 May 1871; Honiton, Devon
- Died: 5 April 1960 (aged 88); Salisbury, Wiltshire
- Military career
- Allegiance: United Kingdom
- Branch: British Army
- Rank: Lieutenant-general
- Conflicts: World War I
- Awards: Knight Commander of the Order of the Bath; Companion of the Order of St Michael and St George

Lieutenant-general Sir Bertram Richard Kirwan KCB CMG (17 May 1871 – 5 April 1960) was a senior British Army officer who became Master-General of the Ordnance in India.

== Military career ==
Educated at Felsted School, Kirwan was commissioned into the Royal Artillery on 25 July 1890.

He saw service in the First World War, becoming a brigadier general, Royal Artillery, in June 1916, and was granted the temporary rank of brigadier general while employed in this role.

He became Major-General, Royal Artillery in Bengal in May 1929 and Master-General of the Ordnance in India in April 1930 before retiring in April 1934.

He was appointed a Companion of the Order of St Michael and St George on 1 January 1916 and a Companion of the Order of the Bath on 3 June 1918. He was advanced to a Knight Commander of the Order of the Bath in the 1934 Birthday Honours.

Military offices
Preceded by Edwin Atkinson	Master-General of the Ordnance (India); 1930−1934	Succeeded by Henry ap Rhys Pryce
