= Henry ap Rhys Pryce =

British Army general (1874–1950)

General Sir Henry ap Rhys Pryce KCB CMG DSO
- General ap Rhys Pryce in 1936
- Born: Henry Edward ap Rhys Pryce; 30 November 1874; Cuttack, British India
- Died: 21 June 1950 (aged 75); Bournemouth, Dorset, England
- Military career
- Allegiance: United Kingdom
- Branch: British Indian Army
- Rank: General
- Commands: Senior Officers' School at Belgaum; Presidency and Assam District; Deccan District
- Conflicts: World War I
- Awards: Knight Commander of the Order of the Bath; Companion of the Order of St Michael and St George; Companion of the Distinguished Service Order

General Sir Henry Edward ap Rhys Pryce, KCB, CMG, DSO (30 November 1874 – 21 June 1950) was a Welsh officer in the Indian Army who served as Master-General of the Ordnance in British India.

== Early life and education ==
Pryce was born on 30 Nov 1874 in Cuttack, British India, the son of Lt.-Col. Douglas Davidson Pryce and Georgie Hunter Carter. His younger brother was soldier of fortune Carol Ap Rhys Pryce. He was educated at Trinity College, Glenalmond, and the Royal Military College, Sandhurst.

== Military career ==
Pryce began his military career on the unattached list in 1895, graduating from the Royal Military College as a Second Lieutenant. He was attached to the 1st Battalion, the Duke of Cornwall's Light Infantry in April of that year.

After a year of service in a British regiment, Pryce was transferred to the 18th Regiment of Bengal Infantry, an Indian regiment.

This was later followed by a posting to the 18th Infantry, the 10th/9th Jats, and the Supply and Transport Corps. As a master of transport, he commanded a mule corps in the British expedition to Tibet, 1903–04. He later authored Transport Training Notes, which served for many years as a valuable handbook to the corps. He then graduated from the Staff College, Quetta, and in 1912 began a distinguished career at Army Headquarters at Shimla.

He served in the First World War during which he was appointed a Companion of the Distinguished Service Order (DSO) and mentioned in dispatches seven times.

Pryce became Commandant of the Senior Officers' School, Belgaum in December 1920 and Director of Supplies and Transport in India. He was appointed a Companion of the Order of the Bath (CB) in the 1925 Birthday Honours. He went on to be General Officer Commanding Presidency and Assam District in October 1929, General Officer Commanding Deccan District in December 1930 and Master-General of the Ordnance in India in April 1934. He was promoted to full general in May 1936.

He was appointed Honorary Colonel of 99th (London Welsh) Heavy Anti-Aircraft Regiment, Royal Artillery, when that Territorial Army unit was raised in 1939, and he regularly visited it during World War II.

== Personal life ==
Pryce married Alice Louise Pughe, daughter of Robertson Francis Home Pughe, in 1900. They had two sons, Meyrick Home ap Rhys Pryce (1902–1965) and Mervyn Aleck ap Rhys Pryce (1905–1940), who was killed in action in France while serving in the Royal Air Force Volunteer Reserve.

Military offices
Preceded by New post	Commandant of the Senior Officers' School, Belgaum; 1920−1924	Succeeded by Douglas Baird
Preceded by Bertram Kirwan	Master-General of the Ordnance (India); 1934−1938	Succeeded by Clement Armitage
