= Clifton Inglis Stockwell =

British Army general (1879–1953)

Brigadier-General Clifton Inglis Stockwell CB CMG DSO
- Born: 1879
- Died: 4 December 1954 (aged 74–75)
- Relatives: Percy Thuillier Westmorland (brother-in-law)
- Military career
- Allegiance: United Kingdom
- Branch: British Army
- Service years: 1899--
- Rank: Brigadier-General
- Service number: 680
- Unit: Royal Welch Fusiliers
- Commands: 1st Battalion, Royal Welsh Fusiliers; 164th Infantry Brigade; Senior Officers' School, Belgaum; 11th Indian Infantry Brigade
- Conflicts: World War I
- Awards: Companion of the Order of the Bath; Companion of the Order of the Bath; Distinguished Service Order; Mentioned in despatches (9)

Brigadier-General Clifton Inglis Stockwell CB CMG DSO (1879 – 4 December 1953) was a British Army officer who, during the First World War, commanded the 164th Infantry Brigade between 1916 and 1919. In December 1914, he was a British officer who agreed to a Christmas truce football match with a German officer.

== Early life ==
Clifton Inglis Stockwell was born in 1879, the eldest son of the late Colonel C. de N. O. Stockwell of the Lincolnshire Regiment. He was educated at Haileybury and then trained at the Royal Military College, Sandhurst.

== Military career ==
After Sandhurst, Stockwell was commissioned into the 2nd Battalion, Royal Welsh Fusiliers (later the Royal Welch Fusiliers) in February 1899 and served with his battalion in China and India.

In September 1914, soon after the commencement of the First World War, he saw active service with the 2nd Battalion at the First Battle of the Aisne. In December 1914, he was serving on the Belgian border at Frelinghien and was the British officer who agreed a Christmas truce football match with the German officer on the other side, Baron Maximilian von Sinner. The two also had a Christmas drink together. Stockwell recorded the experience in his extant diary now held by the Royal Welsh Fusiliers. Stockwell continued to command the A Company of the 2nd Battalion until March 1915, when he transferred to command the A Company of the 1st Battalion. In command of his company, he captured Canadian Orchard at the Battle of Festubert in May 1915, and for this he was mentioned in despatches and awarded the Distinguished Service Order (DSO). The citation for the DSO reads:

For conspicuous gallantry and ability at Festubert on 16th May, 1915, when he led his Company in an attack on the German trenches. After his Company had lost heavily he re-organised it, collected men of other units and made two further successful advances. It was largely due to his gallant and capable leading that the troops succeeded in establishing the line so far forward.

In September 1915, after being promoted to major, he was made brigade major of the 59th Infantry Brigade and was once again mentioned in despatches on 1 January 1916. In February 1916 he was given command of the 1st Battalion of the Royal Welsh Fusiliers where he was responsible for several attacks: Fricourt on 1 July 1916, Triangle Trench on 4 July 1916, Bazentin-le-Petit on 14 July 1916, Delville Wood and Ale, Hop and Beer Alleys on 14 August 1916 and the attack on Guinchy on 3 September 1916. He was again mentioned in despatches in July 1916.

Stockwell was later promoted to brigadier general and appointed to command the 164th Infantry Brigade, part of the 55th (West Lancashire) Division. He led his brigade during an attack on the Gord Line and Gueudecourt on 27 September 1916. He was mentioned in despatches in January 1917 and led his brigade in the Battle of Passchendaele and the Battle of Cambrai. He was again mentioned in despatches and awarded the CMG in January 1918.

Stockwell remained in command of the 164th Infantry Brigade and successfully held Givenchy taking 700 prisoners in April 1918, and was again mentioned in despatches. He commanded a surprise attack on Givenchy in September 1918 and captured the enemy position and pursued the retreating enemy from La Bassée to Tournai and in the forcing of the Haute Dendre Canal. On 9 November 1918 he organised a mobile column known as ‘Stockwell's Force’ which reached a point a mile from Enghien on the day of the Armistice. He was made CB and again mentioned in despatches.

Stockwell was later Commandant of the Senior Officers' School, Belgaum, and Commander of the 11th Indian Infantry Brigade, Ahmednagar, between 1930 and 1931.

== Family life ==
In 1908, Clifton Stockwell married Hilda Rose Westmorland, who predeceased him. By his first wife, who was a sister of Percy Thuillier Westmorland, he had one son and two daughters. In 1944, Stockwell married secondly, Madeline, the widow of Lt-Colonel W.C. Critchley-Salmonson. Stockwell died on 4 December 1953.

Military offices
Preceded by Douglas Baird	Commandant of the Senior Officers' School, Belgaum; 1928–1930	Succeeded by John Scobell
