= Arnold Cazenove =

British Army officer (1898–1969)

Brigadier Arnold Cazenove MVO
- Born: Arnold de Lérisson Cazenove; 18 September 1898
- Died: 2 April 1969 (aged 70)
- Relatives: Christopher Cazenove (son); Arthur Cazenove (grandfather)
- Military career
- Allegiance: United Kingdom
- Branch: British Army
- Service years: 1916–1950
- Rank: Brigadier
- Service number: 1414
- Unit: Coldstream Guards
- Commands: 1st Battalion, Coldstream Guards; 7th Guards Brigade; Guards Support Group; 73rd Independent Infantry Brigade; 140th (4th London) Brigade
- Conflicts: World War I World War II
- Awards: Legion of Merit (United States); Order of Orange-Nassau

Brigadier Arnold de Lérisson Cazenove MVO (18 September 1898 – 2 April 1969) was a British Army officer in World War I and World War II.

== Early life ==
Arnold Cazenove was born on 18 September 1898, the third son of Arthur Philip Cazenove of Cadogan Place, London, of a junior branch of the Cazenoves of Cottesbrooke. He was educated at Eton College and the Royal Military College, Sandhurst.

== Military career ==
In 1916, during World War I, Cazenove passed out of Sandhurst and was commissioned as a second lieutenant into the Coldstream Guards, in which he served on the Western Front in 1917–18. He was mentioned in despatches.

Cazenove served as the adjutant of the 2nd Battalion, Coldstream Guards, in 1922–25, and was on the staff of London District 1926–29. He was promoted to major in 1933 and held the appointments of brigade major to the Brigade of Guards (1933–36) and Officer Commanding Guards Depot (1937). In 1939 he was promoted to brevet lieutenant colonel and took command of the 1st Battalion, Coldstream Guards.

In September 1939, during World War II, the battalion, part of the 7th Guards Brigade of the 3rd Infantry Division, under Major-General Bernard Montgomery, was sent to France to join the British Expeditionary Force (BEF). During the German invasion of France and Belgium in May 1940, the battalion fought in the delaying actions along the Ypres-Comines Canal and was then evacuated from Dunkirk.

The 3rd Infantry Division was the first formation of the BEF to be re-equipped to man the defences of Southeast England. Later that summer (18 August), Cazenove was appointed to command of the 7th Guards Brigade with the rank of temporary brigadier. On 15 September 1941, his headquarters was redesignated Headquarters Guards Support Group (a mainly artillery formation supporting the Guards Armoured Division) and the 7th Guards Brigade ceased to exist. Cazenove continued in command until 10 October when he could be replaced by an artillery officer.

Cazenove was next appointed commander of the 73rd Independent Infantry Brigade from 10 October, and commander of Cornwall Coastal Area in addition from 30 November 1941. He thus had the dual role of commanding field force units for a mobile role and static units for defence of vulnerable points. In December 1942 the 73rd Brigade lost its infantry battalions and was simply designated Cornwall Coastal Area. Next, Cazenove commanded 140th (4th London) Brigade in 47th (London) Infantry Division, a reserve formation, from 13 April 1943 until 31 August 1944 when it was disbanded.

For his war service, Cazenove had been mentioned in despatches, awarded the American Legion of Merit, and made a Commander of the Order of Orange-Nassau. He was Deputy Commander of Aldershot District from 1947 to 1950, was promoted to substantive brigadier in 1948, and retired in 1950.

== Family ==
In 1939 Arnold de Lérisson Cazenove married Elizabeth Laura, daughter of Sir Eustace Gurney, part of the Gurney family of Norwich, long connected with banking and social reform. They had four children:

- Christopher de Lérisson Cazenove (17 December 1943 – 7 April 2010), a film, television and stage actor
- Robert de Lérisson Cazenove (born 1946)
- Isabel de Lérisson Cazenove
- Cecilia Anne de Lérisson Cazenove

Brigadier Cazenove died on 2 April 1969. His grandfather was the cricketer and clergyman Arthur Cazenove.
