= Guards Support Group (United Kingdom) =

- Guards Armoured Division's formation sign
- Active: 15 September 1941–1 June 1942
- Allegiance: United Kingdom
- Branch: British Army
- Type: Armoured Support
- Size: Brigade
- Part of: Guards Armoured Division

The Guards Support Group was a brigade size formation within the British Guards Armoured Division. The Support Group (or "pivot group") provided whatever support the division's armoured brigades needed for the operation in hand. It was able to provide motorised infantry, field artillery, anti-tank artillery or light anti-aircraft artillery as needed. It was formed in 1941 by the conversion of the 7th Infantry Brigade (Guards) which had served in the Battle of France, and disbanded in 1942 (prior to seeing any active service) when it was converted into Headquarters, Royal Artillery, for Guards Armoured Division.

== Commanders ==
The following officers commanded the support group during its existence:

- 15 September 1941 – 10 October 1941 Brigadier A. de L. Cazenove
- 10 October 1941 – 31 May 1942 Brigadier L. C. Manners-Smith

== Order of Battle ==
- 1st Battalion, Welsh Guards
- 153rd (Leicestershire Yeomanry) Field Regiment, Royal Artillery – from 10 October 1941
- 21st Anti-Tank Regiment, Royal Artillery – from 10 October 1941
- 94th Light Anti-Aircraft Regiment, Royal Artillery – from 27 January 1942

== See also ==
- List of British brigades of the Second World War
