= John Scobell =

British Army general (1879–1955)

Major-General Sir John Scobell KBE CB CMG DSO
- Scobell photographed on or before his marriage in 1910 by H. W. Watson
- Born: 26 September 1879; Worcestershire, England
- Died: 2 March 1955 (aged 75); Camberley, Surrey
- Military career
- Allegiance: United Kingdom
- Branch: British Army
- Service years: 1899–1942
- Rank: Major-General
- Service number: 12329
- Unit: Norfolk Regiment
- Commands: Malta Command (1939–42); Quetta Infantry Brigade (1934); Senior Officers' School, Belgaum (1930–32); 1st Battalion, [Norfolk Regiment (1926–28)
- Conflicts: Dervish War; First World War; Russian Civil War; Second World War
- Awards: Knight Commander of the Order of the British Empire; Companion of the Order of the Bath; Companion of the Order of St Michael and St George; Distinguished Service Order; Mentioned in Despatches (8)

Major-General Sir Sanford John Palairet Scobell, KBE, CB, CMG, DSO (26 September 1879 – 2 March 1955) was a senior officer in the British Army.

== Early life ==
Sanford John Palairet Scobell was born on 26 September 1879, the son of Sanford George Treweeke Scobell, of Down House in Redmarley and of Osborne House, The Park, Cheltenham, by his wife Edith, fourth daughter of Septimus Henry Palairet, of the Grange in Bradford-upon-Avon, who was of Huguenot descent. His father was a major in the Queen's Own Worcestershire Hussars and the regiment's Honorary Lieutenant Colonel in 1896; he was the son of Rev. John Scobell, rector of Southover and All Saints in Lewes, who was part of the Scobell family of Nancealverne.

In 1910, Scobell married Cecily Maude, daughter of Charles C. Hopkinson, of Belgrave Lodge in Cheltenham; they had two daughters and two sons. His elder sister, Mary Hamilton Scobell, was the mother of the best-selling author Barbara Cartland.

== Military career ==
Following school at Winchester College, Scobell studied at the Royal Military College, Sandhurst, and was commissioned a second lieutenant in the Norfolk Regiment (later the Royal Norfolk Regiment) on 12 August 1899. He was promoted to the rank of lieutenant on 29 August the following year and served in the Dervish War in 1904. On 24 January 1906, he became a captain and served as an adjutant between November 1907 and November 1910.

When the First World War broke out in August 1914, Scobell was studying at the Staff College, Camberley, and was hurried through schooling. He was a staff officer at Southampton between August and November 1914, before becoming a brigade major in the newly formed 35th Brigade of the 12th (Eastern) Division; he went to France with the unit and remained in the post until February 1916. Over the course of the war, Scobell served in France and Belgium, where he was mentioned in despatches eight times. In February 1916, he was appointed a General Staff Officer (GSO) with the 2nd Division, in France and the following May he was moved up to the 1st Division, where he remained until September 1919, by which time the war was over. He was part of the X Corps' staff when the Somme Offensive began in 1916 and later served with the 49th Division during the Battle of Passchendaele in 1917. In the meantime, he was promoted to the rank of major in September 1915 and brevet lieutenant colonel on New Year's Day 1918.

From 23 October 1919 to 23 March 1920, Scobell was a GSO with the Military Mission to Russia during the Russian Civil War; he was then transferred to the Black Sea and Turkey, where he remained until August 1923. On 10 January 1926, after returning to England, he was made a substantive lieutenant colonel and was commanding officer of the 1st Battalion, Norfolk Regiment. On 1 December 1928 he was made an assistant adjutant general at the War Office and promoted to colonel with seniority from New Year's Day 1922. In August 1930, he was posted to be commandant at the Senior Officers' School, Belgaum in India with the temporary rank of brigadier. He was there until 1 April 1932, when he took command of the Quetta Infantry Brigade in India. He was promoted to major general on 16 June 1934, but relinquished his post and went on the half-pay list on 15 September. He returned to the full pay list as a district commander in India on 25 November 1935. He retired in 1939, but was recalled that October with the outbreak of the Second World War. He commanded troops in Malta between 1939 and 1942, but went on the retired list again in 1942. He took up the ceremonial position of Lieutenant of the Tower of London, which he vacated in 1945.

Scobell was awarded the Distinguished Service Order in 1916 and was appointed a Companion of the Order of St Michael and St George in 1919, a Companion of the Order of the Bath in 1935, and a Knight Commander of the Order of the British Empire in 1942. He died on 2 March 1955, at a nursing home in Camberley, Surrey.

== Bibliography ==
- Smart, Nick (2005). Biographical Dictionary of British Generals of the Second World War. Barnesley: Pen & Sword. ISBN 1844150496.

Military offices
Preceded by Douglas Baird	Commandant of the Senior Officers' School, Belgaum; 1930–1932	Succeeded by Martin Kemp-Welch
New command	GOC Malta Command; 1939–1942	Succeeded by Daniel Beak
