= 73rd Brigade (United Kingdom) =

Military unit

The 73rd Brigade was an infantry brigade formation of the British Army that served in both the First and the Second World Wars.

== First World War ==
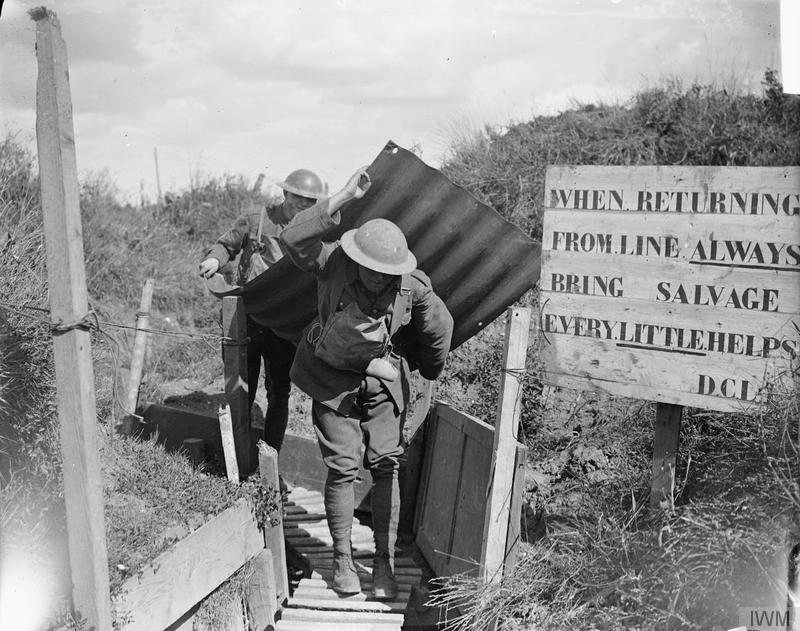
Two men of the 9th (Service) Battalion, Royal Sussex Regiment, bringing in a piece of elephant back iron as salvage, near Lens, 3 September 1918.

The 73rd Brigade was originally raised during the First World War in September 1914 from men volunteering for Lord Kitchener's New Armies, and was assigned to the 24th Division. The brigade consisted of battalions from the East of England and spent the early months of its existence training. The brigade, with the division, departed for the Western Front in August 1915, fighting in many of the major battles of the war, such as the Battle of Loos, the Battle of the Somme, the Battle of Vimy Ridge, Battle of Passchendaele and in the German spring offensive and the Hundred Days Offensive, which saw the war come to an end on 11 November 1918 . The brigade had suffered extremely heavy casualties during the war and was disbanded in late March 1919.

=== Order of battle ===
The brigade was constituted as follows during the war:

- 12th (Service) Battalion, Royal Fusiliers (City of London Regiment) (left October 1915)
- 9th (Service) Battalion, Royal Sussex Regiment
- 7th (Service) Battalion, Northamptonshire Regiment
- 13th (Service) Battalion, Duke of Cambridge's Own (Middlesex Regiment)
- 2nd Battalion, Prince of Wales's Leinster Regiment (Royal Canadians) (from October 1915, left February 1918)
- 73rd Machine Gun Company, Machine Gun Corps (formed 14 March 1916, moved to 24th Battalion, Machine Gun Corps 5 March 1918)
- 73rd Trench Mortar Battery (formed 15 June 1916)

== Second World War ==
The brigade number was reactivated again during the Second World War, in late March 1941, this time as the 73rd Independent Infantry Brigade. The brigade initially consisted of infantry battalions raised for hostilities-only and, aside from a few Regular and Territorial soldiers, was composed almost entirely of conscripts and wartime volunteers. In December 1942 the battalions were posted elsewhere and the brigade ceased to be an operational formation, although the headquarters remained in existence until 19 July 1943, when it was finally disbanded.

The brigade served under various commands throughout its short existence: GHQ Home Forces from 19 June and 2 July 1941, the Devon and Cornwall County Division between 3 July and 30 November 1941, VIII Corps between 1 December 1941 and 12 December 1942, and Southern Command from 13 December 1942 and 18 July 1943.

=== Order of battle ===
The 73rd Brigade was constituted as follows during the war:

- 18th Battalion, Royal Fusiliers (from 27 March 1941, left 17 May 1941)
- 9th Battalion, King's Own Scottish Borderers (from 3 April 1941, left 17 May 1941)
- 6th Battalion, Royal Irish Fusiliers (from 3 April 1941, left 17 May 1941)
- 7th Battalion, East Yorkshire Regiment (from 19 July 1941, left 21 September 1942)
- 6th Battalion, Duke of Cornwall's Light Infantry (from 19 July 1941, left 9 December 1942)
- 8th Battalion, Bedfordshire and Hertfordshire Regiment (from 19 July 1941, left 11 December 1942)
- 2nd Battalion, Hertfordshire Regiment (from 22 September 1942, left 8 December 1942)

=== Commanders ===
The following officers commanded the brigade during the war:

- Brigadier W. Robb (from 24 March 1941 until 18 June 1941)
- Brigadier J.A. Campbell (from 18 June 1941 until 10 October 1941)
- Brigadier A.de L. Cazenove (from 10 October 1941)

== Bibliography ==
- Joslen, H. F. (2003) [1960]. Orders of Battle: Second World War, 1939–1945. Uckfield, East Sussex: Naval and Military Press. ISBN 978-1-84342-474-1.
