= Sir John Whitaker, 2nd Baronet =

British Army officer

Major-General Sir John Whitaker Bt CB CBE DL
- Born: 5 March 1897
- Died: 5 October 1957 (aged 60)
- Military career
- Allegiance: United Kingdom
- Branch: British Army
- Service years: 1915–1946
- Rank: Major-General
- Nickname: "Jack"
- Service number: 11783
- Unit: Coldstream Guards
- Commands: 7th Infantry Brigade (Guards); 3rd Battalion, Coldstream Guards
- Conflicts: First World War; Second World War
- Awards: Companion of the Order of the Bath; Commander of the Order of the British Empire; Mentioned in Despatches (2)

Major-General Sir John Albert Charles Whitaker, 2nd Baronet, CB, CBE, DL (5 March 1897 – 5 October 1957 was a senior British Army officer who served in the First World War and the Second World War.

== Military career ==
Born the son of Sir Albert Edward Whitaker, 1st Baronet and educated at Eton College and the Royal Military College, Sandhurst, Whitaker was commissioned into the Coldstream Guards of the British Army on 12 May 1915 during the First World War. His service during the war was on the Western Front with the third battalion, where he was wounded in April 1918 during the German spring offensive and taken prisoner by the enemy.

After being repatriated, he was married in 1923 to Pamela Lucy Mary Snowden, the daughter of Herbert Guy Snowden and Florence Mary Hankey. He served as a staff officer from 1923 to 1926 at the Small Arms School at Hythe in Kent before attending the Staff College, Camberley from 1926 to 1927. He was then made Deputy Assistant Adjutant and Quartermaster-General with London District from 1932 to 1933, later serving as a staff officer with Eastern Command in 1933 to 1936. Following this, he was made commanding officer (CO) of the 3rd Battalion, Coldstream Guards, with which he had served in the First World War, and, after briefly commanding the regimental district, he was promoted to command of the 7th Infantry Brigade (Guards) in late 1938, receiving a promotion to brigadier at the relatively young age (in peacetime, where promotion was slow) of 41.

He was deployed to France with his brigade as part of the 3rd Infantry Division in the British Expeditionary Force (BEF) at the start of the Second World War in late 1939.

Following the Battle of France and the subsequent Dunkirk evacuation, the 3rd Division was placed on Home Defence duties and Whitaker briefly served as General Officer Commanding (GOC) of the 3rd Division from 22 to 25 July 1940. After serving as a Brigadier General Staff (BGS) with Western Command from August 1940, he went on to be Director of Military Training at the War Office in London in March 1942. His new appointment was followed by a promotion, to the acting rank of major-general, on 9 March 1942. This was made temporary a year later. He left his post at the War Office at the end of the war and retired from the army in 1946, after over thirty years of service. He became a Deputy lieutenant of Nottinghamshire in October 1946 and High Sheriff of Nottinghamshire in 1950.

Whitaker was appointed a Companion of the Order of the Bath in the 1944 Birthday Honours.

== Bibliography ==
- Smart, Nick (2005). Biographical Dictionary of British Generals of the Second World War. Barnesley: Pen & Sword. ISBN 1844150496.

Baronetage of the United Kingdom
Preceded by Albert Edward Whitaker	Baronet (of Babworth); 1945–1957	Succeeded by James Herbert Ingham Whitaker
