= Douglas Baird (Indian Army officer) =

British Indian Army general (1877–1963)

General Sir Douglas Baird KCB CMG CIE DSO
- General Baird in 1932
- Born: 4 April 1877; Kensington, London
- Died: 2 July 1963 (aged 86); Elgin, Moray, Scotland
- Military career
- Allegiance: United Kingdom
- Branch: British Indian Army
- Service years: 1897–1940
- Rank: General
- Commands: 1/8th Battalion, Argyll and Sutherland Highlanders; 75th Brigade; 28th Punjabis; Zhob Brigade; Senior Officers' School, Belgaum; Kohat District; Deccan District; Eastern Command, India
- Conflicts: World War I World War II
- Awards: Knight Commander of the Order of the Bath; Companion of the Order of St Michael and St George; Companion of the Order of the Star of India; Companion of the Distinguished Service Order

General Sir Harry Beauchamp Douglas Baird KCB CMG CIE DSO (4 April 1877 – 2 July 1963) was a British officer in the British Indian Army.

== Early life and education ==
Baird was born in Kensington, London, the son of Scottish Colonel Andrew Wilson Baird and Margaret Elizabeth Davidson. He was educated at Clifton College and the Royal Military College, Sandhurst.

== Military career ==
Baird was commissioned on the unattached list of the Indian Army on 20 January 1897.

In March 1912 he was appointed as an aide-de-camp to Lieutenant General Sir Douglas Haig.

He served on the Western Front in World War I becoming commanding officer of the 1st/8th Battalion the Argyll and Sutherland Highlanders in 1916 and then, after a promotion to brevet lieutenant colonel in January 1917, as a general staff officer, grade 2 (GSO2) first with 51st (Highland) Division and then with the Cavalry Corps before becoming commander of the 75th Infantry Brigade in 1916.

After the war Baird became a General Staff Officer at 4th Indian Infantry Division in India, Brigadier-General on the General Staff with the Baluchistan Force and then commanding officer of the 28th Punjabis. He then became commander of the Zhob Brigade in November 1920, and on 21 November 1923 was appointed as a colonel on the staff at Army Headquarters, India, and relinquished his temporary colonel commandant's rank. He was commandant of the Senior Officers' School, Belgaum, in 1924.

Baird, promoted on 5 June 1928 to major general, went on to be Deputy Adjutant and Quartermaster-General in India in July 1929 and General Officer Commanding the Kohat District in December 1930. Then he became General Officer Commanding the Deccan District in 1932 and General Officer Commanding-in-Chief Eastern Command in April 1936 before retiring in April 1940.

== Bibliography ==
- Smart, Nick (2005). Biographical Dictionary of British Generals of the Second World War. Barnesley: Pen & Sword. ISBN 1844150496.

Military offices
| Preceded by Henry ap Rhys Pryce | Commandant of the Senior Officers' School, Belgaum; 1924–1928 | Succeeded by Clifton Stockwell |
| Preceded by Sir Norman MacMullen | GOC-in-C Eastern Command, India; 1936–1940 | Succeeded by Sir Charles Broad |
