= Clement Armitage =

British Army general (1881–1973)

General Sir Clement Armitage KCB CMG DSO & Bar DL
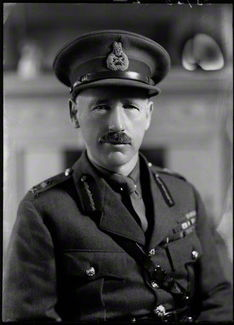
- Armitage in 1937
- Born: 12 December 1881; Honley, West Riding of Yorkshire, England
- Died: 15 December 1973 (aged 92); Lechlade, Gloucestershire, England
- Children: Charles Armitage (son)
- Military career
- Allegiance: United Kingdom
- Branch: British Army
- Service years: 1900–1942
- Rank: General
- Service number: 1446
- Unit: Royal Artillery
- Commands: 1st Infantry Division (1936–1938); Staff College, Camberley (1934–1936); 7th Infantry Brigade (1929–1932); Royal School of Artillery (1926–1929)
- Conflicts: Second Boer War; First World War; Arab revolt in Palestine; Second World War
- Awards: Knight Commander of the Order of the Bath; Companion of the Order of St Michael and St George; Companion of the Distinguished Service Order; Mentioned in Despatches

General Sir Charles Clement Armitage, KCB, CMG, DSO, DL (12 December 1881 – 15 December 1973) was a British Army officer who commanded 1st Division during the 1930s.

== Early life ==
The son of Charles Ingram Armitage, Armitage was born in Honley, West Riding of Yorkshire. His family were historically mill-owners who lived at Milnsbridge House, Huddersfield.

== Military career ==
Armitage was commissioned into the Royal Artillery as a second lieutenant on 6 January 1900, as the army expanded due to the ongoing Second Boer War in South Africa, where he was sent. He was promoted to lieutenant on 3 April 1901, while still in South Africa.

After the end of this war in May 1902, Armitage was attached to the 74th Battalion, Royal Field Artillery, which left Durban for British India in October 1902, and was stationed at Lucknow, Bengal Presidency.

On 27 July 1910 he was made an assistant director of Army Signals.

He later fought in the First World War, serving in France and Belgium.

He was promoted in July 1922 to brevet colonel and, after being seconded from his regiment, was appointed chief instructor in gunnery at the School of Artillery on 18 May 1925, He was promoted to colonel (with seniority dated back to 1 January 1921), on 17 June and on 6 November 1926 became commandant of the School of Artillery, receiving a temporary promotion to colonel commandant whilst employed in this role. He was commander of the 7th Infantry Brigade in 1929.

On 9 November 1930 he was appointed personal aide-de-camp to King George V, succeeding Colonel Robert Gordon-Finlayson in the role. He was promoted on 6 June 1932 to major general and went on to be commandant of the Staff College, Camberley, in 1934, and later was general officer commanding (GOC) of the 1st Infantry Division. The division was sent to Palestine during the 1936–1939 Arab revolt. He was aided throughout this difficult period by his General Staff Officer Grade 1 (GSO1), Thomas Hutton and in December 1937 was promoted to lieutenant general. After handing over command of the division to Major General The Hon. Sir Harold Alexander, later a field marshal, Armitage was appointed master general of the Ordnance in India on 1 April 1938, in which role he served in the Second World War before retiring in 1942. In June 1938 he was granted the prestigious position of colonel commandant of the Royal Artillery.

Armitage lived at Downington House in Lechlade, and served as deputy lieutenant for the county of Gloucestershire.

== Family ==
In 1915, Armitage married Hilda Hirst of Meltham Hall, and they had three sons, Charles, Robert and Johnny, and a daughter Mary.

== Bibliography ==
- Smart, Nick (2005). Biographical Dictionary of British Generals of the Second World War. Barnesley: Pen & Sword. ISBN 1844150496.

Military offices
Preceded by William Stirling	Commandant of the School of Artillery, Larkhill; 1926–1929	Succeeded by Alan Brooke
Preceded by John Dill	Commandant of the Staff College, Camberley; 1934–1936	Succeeded by Viscount Gort
Preceded by John Kennedy	GOC 1st Infantry Division; 1936–1938	Succeeded by The Hon. Harold Alexander
Preceded by Henry ap Rhys Pryce	Master-General of the Ordnance (India); 1938−1942	Succeeded by Clarence Bird
