= St. Andrew's, Malta =

St. Andrew's is an area, formerly part of Għargħur, at the borders of Swieqi and Pembroke local councils in Malta. It takes its name from St Andrews Barracks which were part of the Pembroke Army Garrison in the 1900s.

== History ==
During the early 1900s, St Andrew's had its own adult school for British soldiers called Moynihan House, the birthplace of Berkeley G.A. Moynihan, an internationally acclaimed British abdominal surgeon who served as president of the Royal College of Surgeons of England for many years. Plans to demolish this historic building raised public disdain with the President of the Malta Association of Surgeons, Prof. Joseph Galea, asking for it to be saved. Various organisations and personalities raised their concerns about the plans to demolish the building.

January 22, 1916 saw the inauguration of Australia Hall and the adjoining St Andrew's Hospital. A primary school for army children opened at St Andrew's in 1908, which remained in use until 1978.

== Location ==
St. Andrews as a locality forms part of the much larger town of St. Julian's. The development within the area increased drastically after the year 2000 with many houses being pulled down and converted into apartment blocks.

This location sits on the main road leading to the north of the island.

== Sport ==
St. Andrews is home to St. Andrews F.C. of the Maltese Premier League, whose home stadium is the UEFA approved Luxol Stadium It is also the home of Luxol St. Andrews Futsal Club.
