= Pembroke Army Garrison =

Former British Army barracks near Fort Pembroke, Malta

Pembroke Garrison
- Pembroke, Malta

Site information
- Type: Fortifications, Barracks, military families' quarters and Wartime Military Hospitals in WW1 and WW2
- Owner: Government of Malta
- Controlled by: Pembroke Town Council
- Condition: Largely intact with some derelict buildings

Location
- Coordinates: 35°55′30″N 14°28′30″E
- Height: Low rise

Site history
- Built: 1862 with several development phases up til 1941
- Built by: British Empire
- In use: 1869–1977
- Materials: Limestone
- Battles/wars: Logistic and medical support to World War I and the Siege of Malta (World War II)

Pembroke Garrison is a dispersed collection of former British Army barracks built in the vicinity of Fort Pembroke, northern Malta.

== History ==
Pembroke Garrison developed around a Victorian fortification (Fort Pembroke), a gun emplacement, a barracks, a tented musketry camp, rifle ranges and training areas. St George's Barracks was built first, followed by Fort Pembroke, then St Andrew's Barracks and finally St Patrick's Barracks; built by the British in four main building phases 19th and 20th centuries. Part of the garrison (St Andrew's Barracks) was used as a military hospital during the First World War; during the war Malta's military hospitals and convalescent camps, particularly those at Pembroke, dealt with over 135,000 sick and wounded, most of whom were casualties of the Gallipoli and Salonika campaigns. It remained in use by the British military until 1977. St Patrick's Barracks was not constructed until World War Two.

Today the former British garrison sits inside the Pembroke Local Council administrative area (shown in red).

Army units based at Pembroke Garrison between 1954 and 1967 would have been subordinate to Headquarters Malta and Libya.

At the height of its occupancy the British garrison at Pembroke included St George's, St Patrick's and St Andrew's Barracks, places of worship, firing ranges and Fort Pembroke itself; as well as a military repair base, a medical centre, a military cemetery, a garrison school and other soldier and family welfare facilities (i.e. a NAAFI shop, military post office and beach club (the 'Robb Lido' along the northern edge of St George's Bay) and regimental messes).

In May 1940 naval and army families living on the island were moved to Pembroke Garrison (into St George's and St Andrew's Barracks). Once St Patrick's barracks were constructed in 1941 Pembroke Garrison would be a critical medical support base for the island.

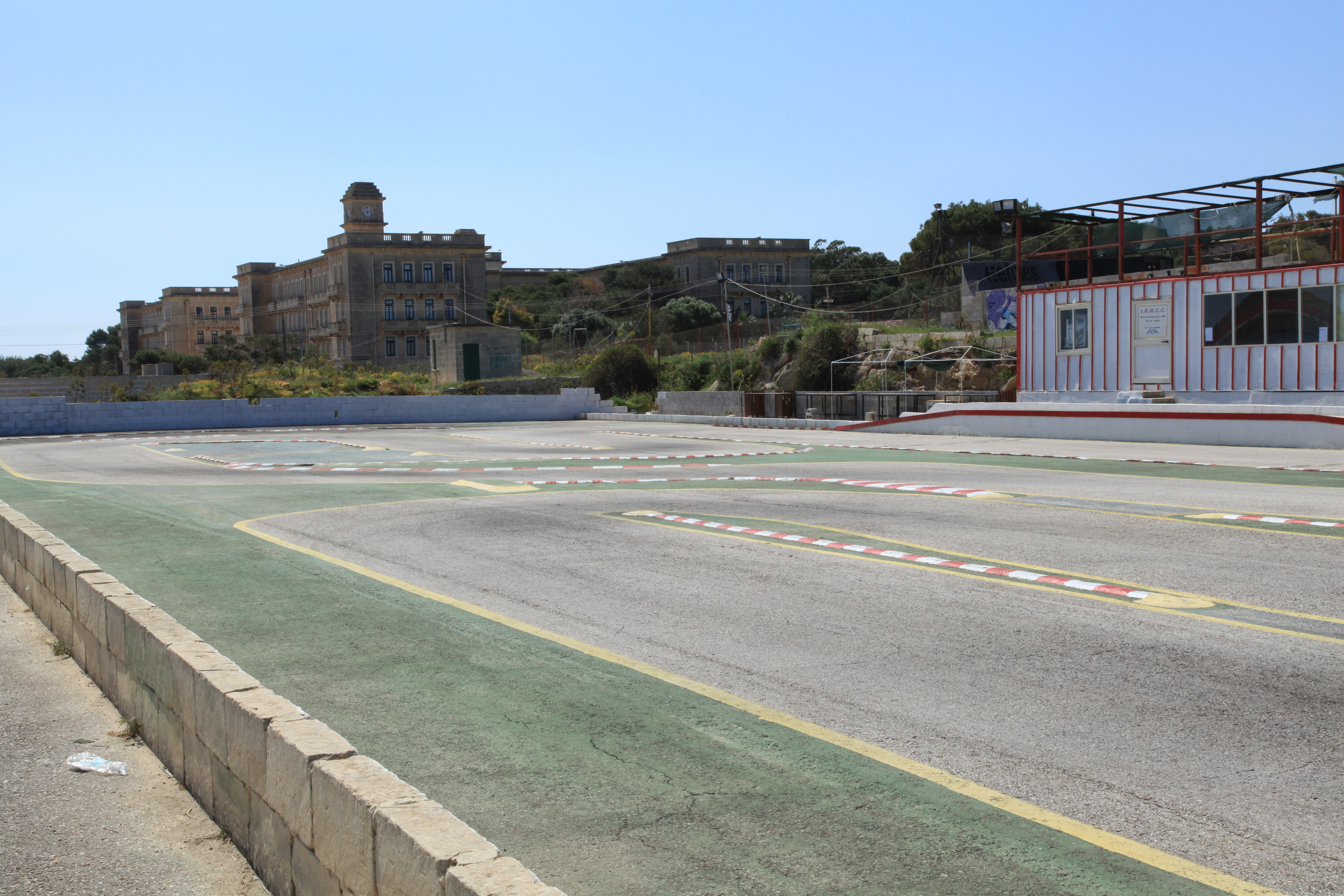
St Patrick's Barracks in the background, it is now a girls secondary school.

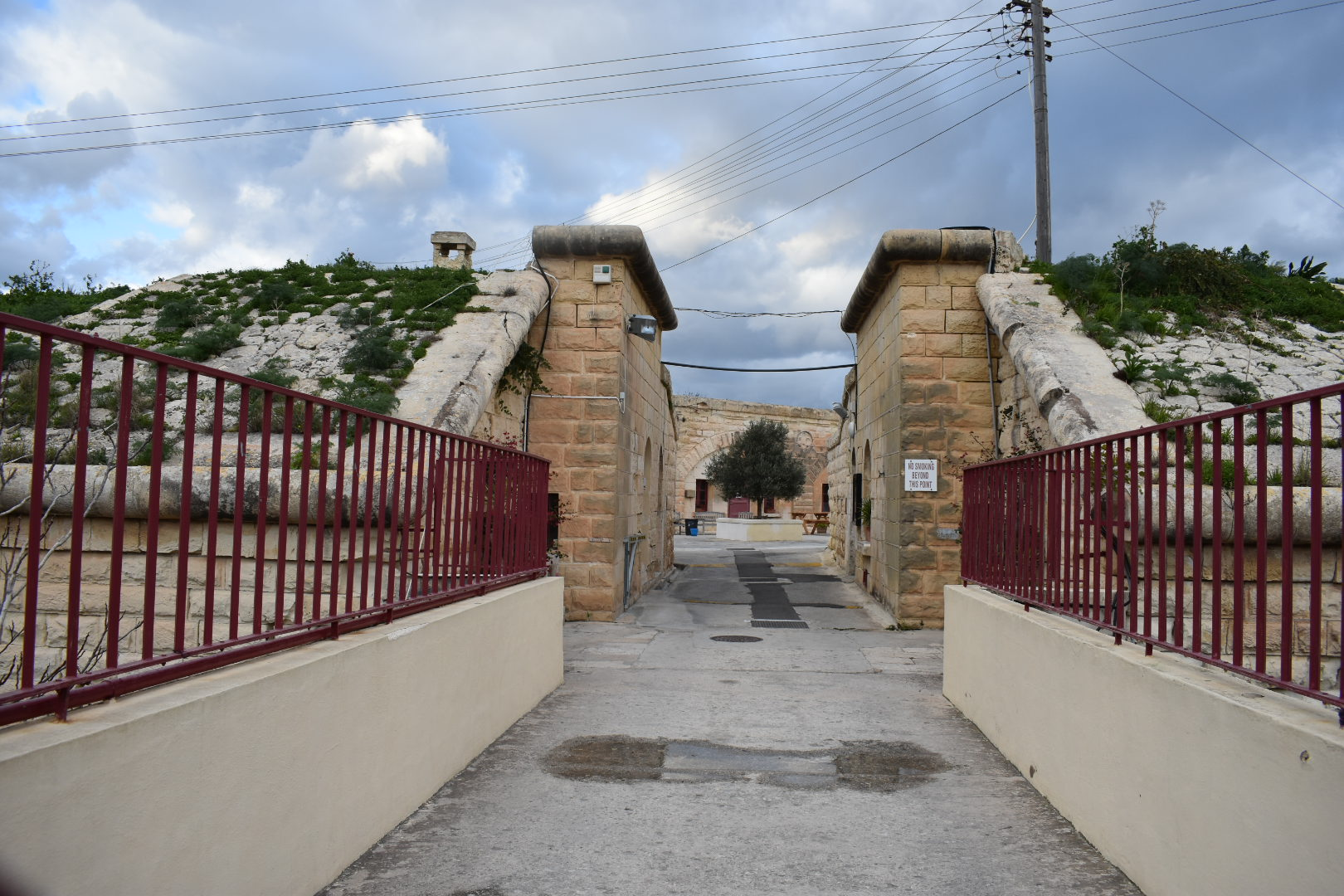
The entrance to Fort Pembroke, now housing the Verdala International School.

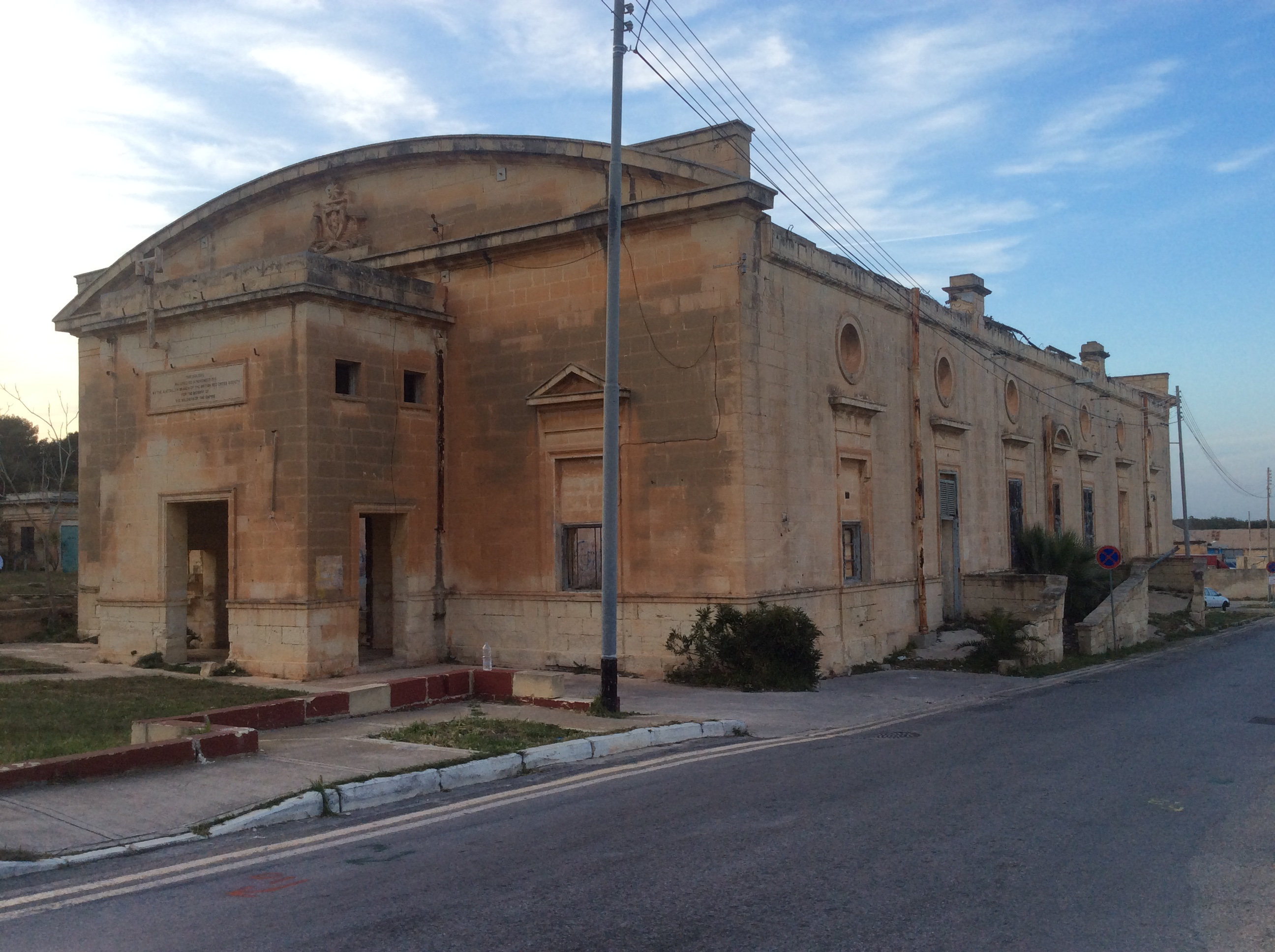
The now derelict Australia Hall at St Andrew's Barracks, built as a theatre and cinema after World War I.

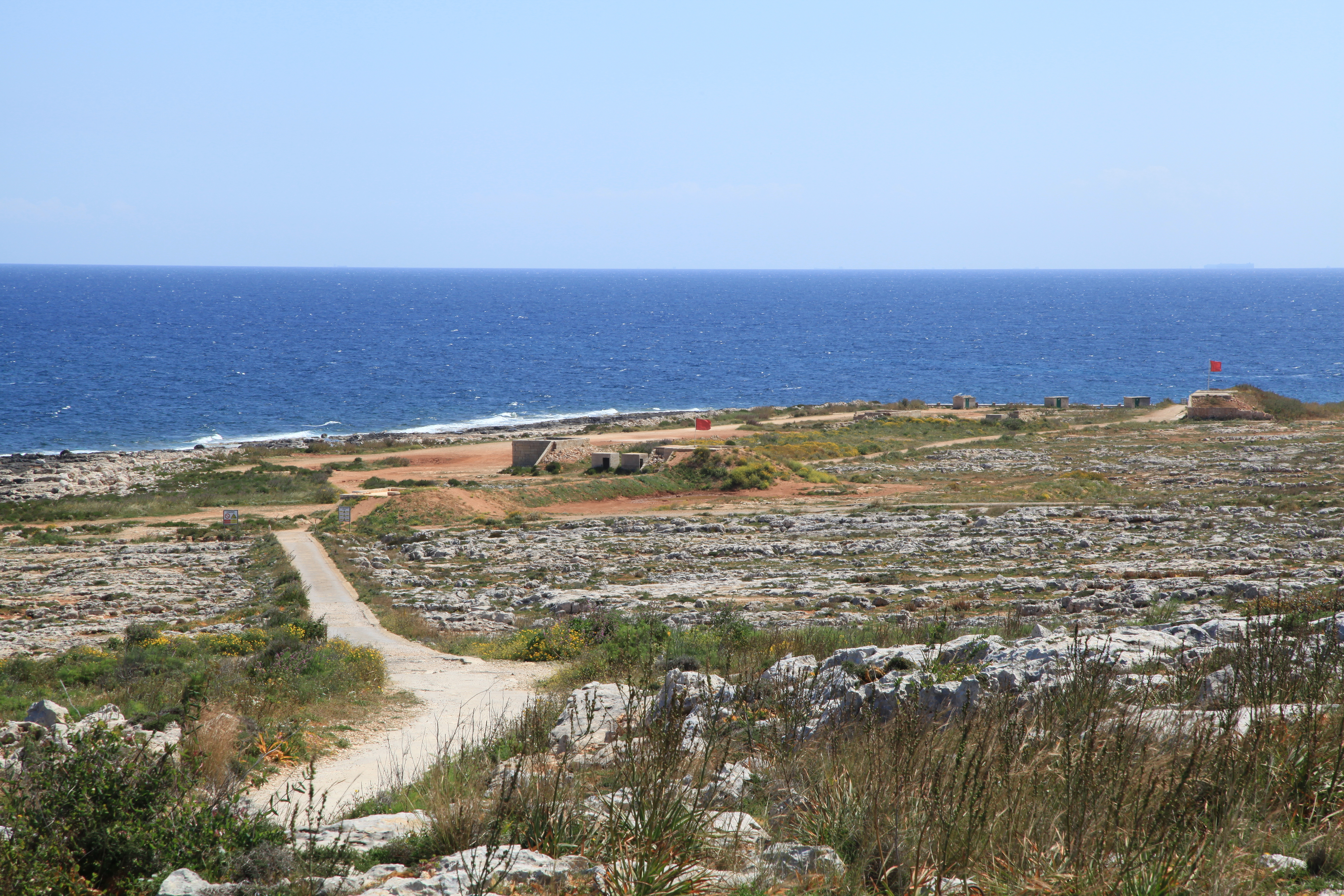
The Pembroke Ranges looking out to sea; the ranges are still being used by the Maltese Government, but this is already ear-marked as a unique conservation area.

== British Army and Royal Marines units based at Pembroke Garrison ==
This is not an exhaustive list of the British Army and Royal Marines (RM) units that occupied the Pembroke Garrison, but it represents those that are recorded:

St Georges Barracks - constructed between 1859 and 1862

- 2nd Battalion the Loyal Regiment (North Lancashire) - 1899–1901
- 4th Battalion the Rifle Brigade - 1906
- 2nd Battalion the Devonshire Regiment - 1911
- The Gloucestershire Regiment - 1913
- Barracks converted to a hospital to take casualties from Dardanelles Campaign - 1915
- The South Staffordshire Regiment - 1928
- 1st Battalion the Queen's Royal Regiment (West Surrey) - 1930
- The Cheshire Regiment - 1932
- 1st Battalion the Suffolk Regiment - 1937 to 1939
- 40 Commando Royal Marines (RM) - 1949
- 73 Heavy Air Defence Regiment Regiment - 1951
- 8 Commando Light Battery RA - 1976
- A flight of three RM Aérospatiale Gazelle AH-1 Helicopters - 1977

St Andrew's Barracks - not occupied until April 1905

- 4th Battalion the Rifle Brigade - 1908
- 39 General Hospital RAMC - arrived from UK in 1941
- 2nd Battalion The King's Own Malta Regiment, acting as a POW guard force at No1 (Malta) Prisoner of War Camp at Pembroke
- 45 Commando RM - 1952 Arrived from Malaya
- 40 Commando RM - 1957
- 1st Battalion the Royal Sussex Regiment - 1963–1965
- 1st Battalion the Loyal Regiment (North Lancashire) - 1965–1967
- 41 Commando RM - 1977

St Paul's Hutments

- Sick Soldiers' Hospital and Convalescent Camp
- 53 Command Workshops REME - present during WW2 and up to the 1970s

St Patrick's Barracks - constructed in 1941

- 45 General Hospital RAMC - arrived from UK in 1941
- 45 Commando RM - May 1947 and December 1948
- 37 Heavy Anti-Aircraft Regiment RA - 1956
- 4th (Leicestershire) Battalion the Royal Anglian Regiment c1965-1967.

Although the Pembroke Garrison was nominally an Army facility able to house three infantry battalions, it is clear that the Royal Marines had a long post-war association with Pembroke.

== Transfer of ownership to the Maltese Government ==
The bulk of the garrison's sites were decommissioned and handed to the Government of Malta in 1977. The barracks and their environs are now divided into a thriving community of Pembroke made up public and private housing; and a number of notable colleges and schools, many of them located in re-purposed original British Army barrack blocks.

The limestone karst countryside around promotes a unique ecology called garigue which the local authorities are keen to promote as a visitor attraction, along with the military heritage.

Legacy Pembroke site reuse noted

- St George's Barracks (part of) - Institute of Tourism Studies.
- Fort Pembroke and St Andrew's Barracks (part of) - the Verdala International School Malta.
- Pembroke Battery site - all but one emplacement redeveloped as housing.
- St Andrews Barracks (part of) - Pembroke Local Council
- St Andrew's Barracks (part of i.e. Block A, Alamein Road) - Middlesex University Malta
- St Andrew's Barracks (part of i.e. Block D, Giorgio Mitrovich Street) - STC training college.
- St Andrew's Barracks (part of) - St Michael's School.
- St Andrew's Barracks (part of) - Sprachcaffe residential language school
- St Andrew's Garrison School and the barrack's sports pitches - The National Sports School
- St Patrick's Barracks (part of) - St Clare College.

St George's Barracks (the oldest of Pembroke Garrison's unit location) has not survived intact (as did St Andrew's and St Patrick's) and this probably reflects the fact that after British withdrawal from Malta there was not the imperative and funds that there is now to preserve and use heritage imperial building stock. Australia Hall, the former REME workshops and the White Rocks Officers' Quarters areas are still in need of development and restoration.

== See also ==
- Fort Madalena
- Siege of Malta (World War II)
- Mediterranean Fleet
- Malta at War Museum
- Armed Forces of Malta
- Fortifications of Malta
- Paceville
