= Malta Fortress Squadron, Royal Engineers =

British Royal Engineer unit

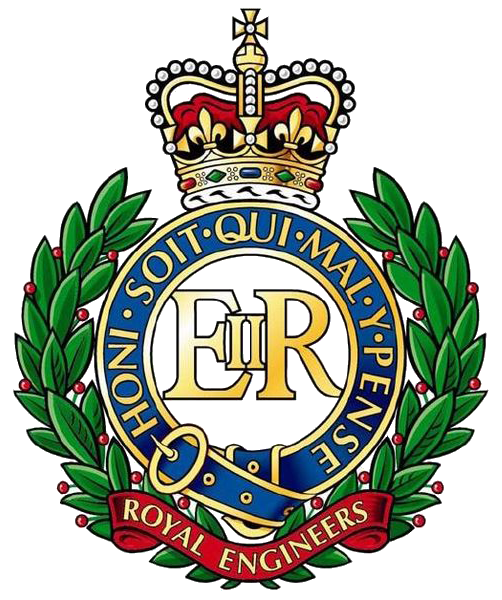
- The Cap badge of the Corps of Royal Engineers worn by the Malta Fortress Squadron.
- Founded: 1892
- Disbanded: 1970
- Headquarters: Valletta

Personnel
- Conscription: Volunteer and Territorial Force

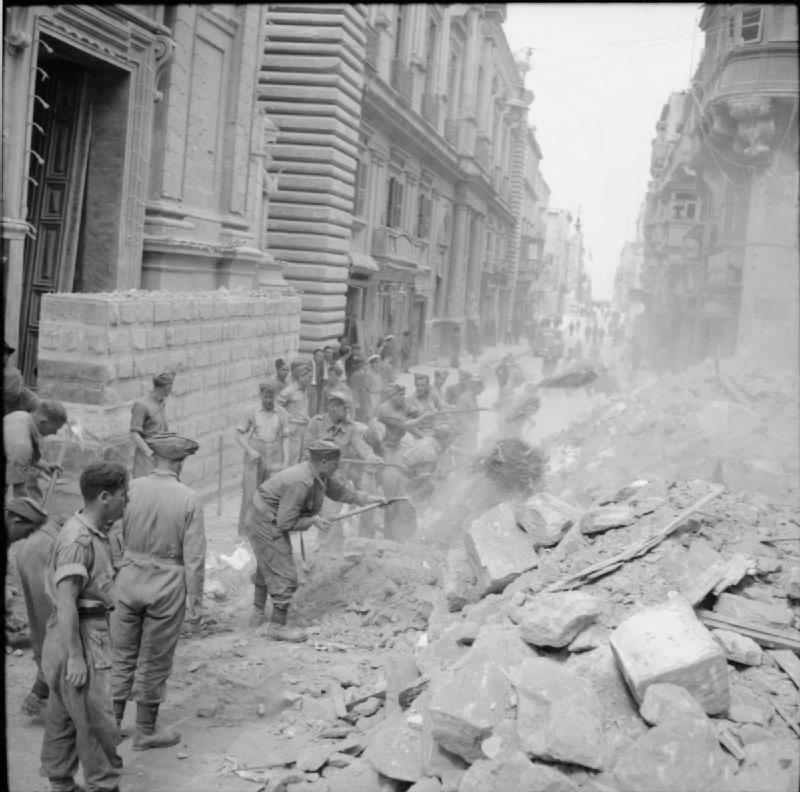
Bomb damage to the streets of Valletta in 1942, illustrating the intensity of bombardment the Island suffered and the scale of the engineering tasks the RE faced.

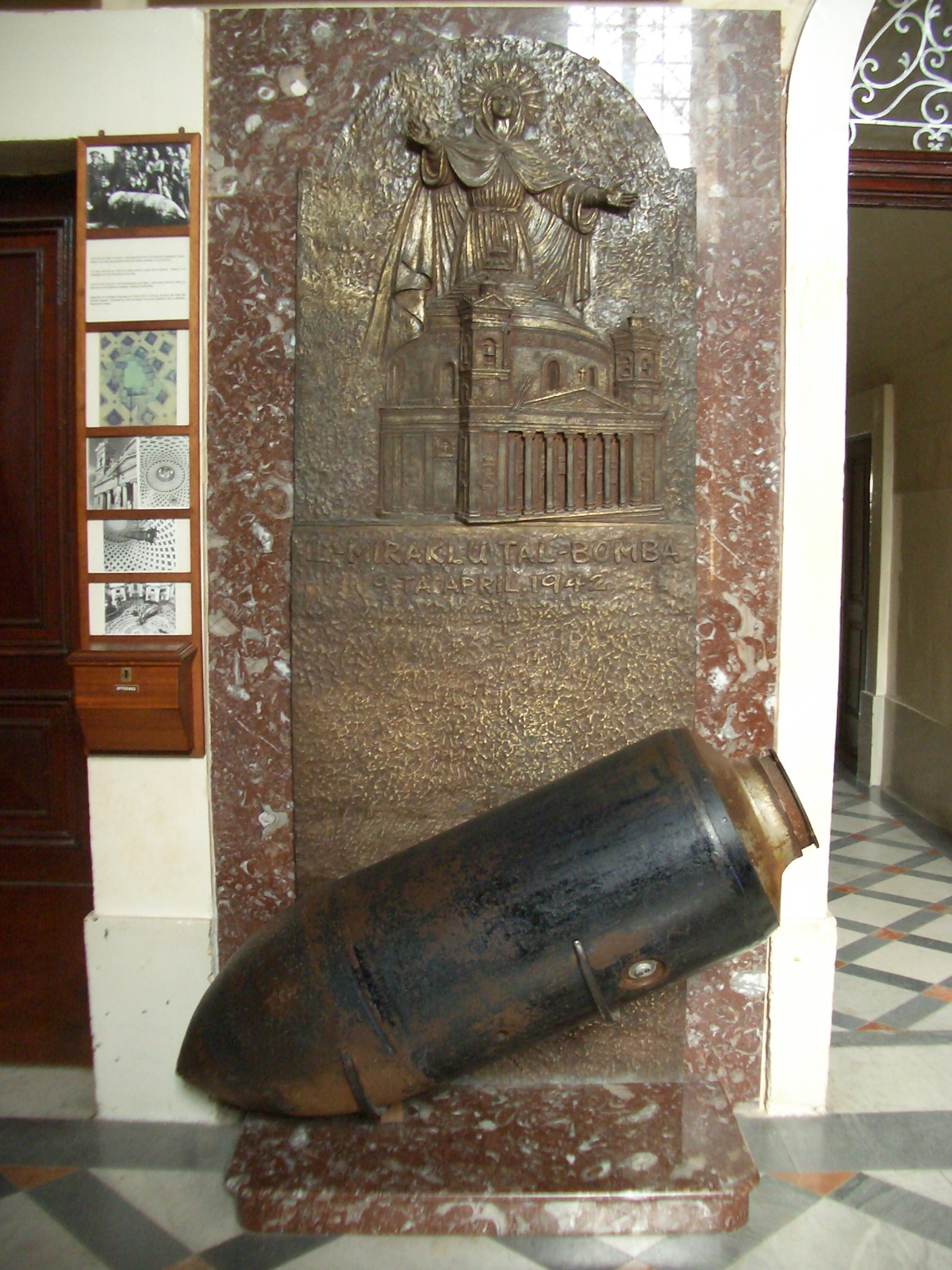
A replica of the Axis bomb that penetrated the dome of Mosta's church without exploding.

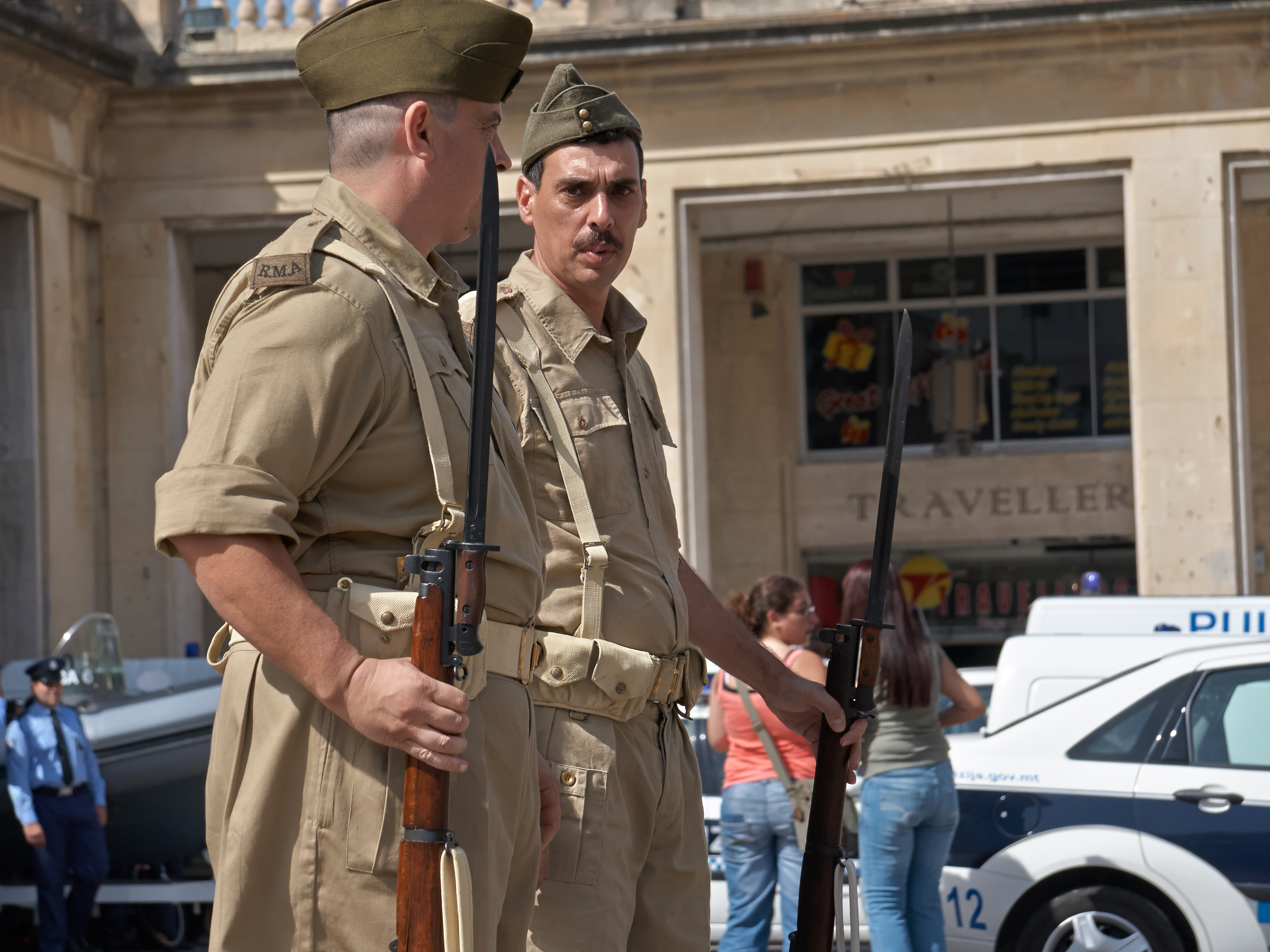
Soldiers from a living history group wearing WW2-era Khaki drill uniforms and carrying .303 SMLE rifles on a parade in Valletta in 2008

The Malta Fortress Squadron was a locally recruited Royal Engineers unit based on Malta and on the British Army colonial list prior to Malta's independence. Its history is intimately tied to the succession of engineer and sapper units that were formed and reformed to support the extensive fortifications on the island of Malta.

Initially on the British Establishment, in 1951 it was transferred to the Malta Territorial Force before becoming part of the Malta Land Force on Malta's independence in 1964. The regiment was disbanded in 1970 with its personnel and equipment being handed over to the Maltese Government.

== History ==
Victorian and Edwardian Era

In 1892 the Maltese Militia Division Submarine Miners Royal Engineers was raised on a territorial (part-time) basis, utilising the skills and knowledge of the harbour boatmen. This small part-time volunteer force was commanded by a small permanent staff of a Lieutenant, a Company Sergeant Major, three Sergeants and a clerk. Volunteers agreed to performing a 120 days of paid duty annually for five years.

In 1907 the London Gazette recorded the following:

"War Office, 26th March, 1907.

His Majesty the King has been graciously pleased to approve of the Royal Engineers '(Militia) Submarine Miners, Malta Division,' being in future designated 'Royal Engineers (Militia) Malta Division'."

World War 1

The Royal Engineers (Militia) Malta Division title would survive as an entity throughout the Great War and until 1921.

At the beginning of the war the strength of the RE on the island (including Maltese servicemen) was 21 officers and 394 other ranks.

The Inter-war Years

In the period between the two World Wars there were British and Maltese Fortress Companies based on the Island (16 and 24 (Fortress) Companies). Their role was to provide searchlight support to anti-aircraft and anti-shipping artillery batteries and engineer works in and around the harbour areas of Malta.

In 1923 Royal Engineers (Militia) Malta Division was noted as having a strength of 7 officers and 70 other ranks, most of whom were in 24 (Fortress) Company RE.

In 1935 the RE units were commanded by Headquarters Fortress RE Malta and it and 24 Company were located in Floriana barracks. 16 Company was based at Marsamxett Barracks.

World War 2

During World War 2 the Fortress RE Malta units would have performed a range of engineer tasks. They included Bomb Disposal - a vital task given the intensity of bombing Malta and the Valletta and Sliema areas suffered. One to two officers and a maximum of 30 men dealt with 7300 unexploded bombs in two years (1940-42).

Post War Service

After the war the unit would suffer a tragedy when a Handley Page Hastings C-2 (WD498) carrying one of the unit crashed on take off at RAF El Adem in Libya on 10 October 1961. Fifteen soldiers from the Squadron would lose their lives they are commemorated and some buried at the Pembroke Military Cemetery.

On 30 September 1970 HQ RE Malta, the Fortress Squadron and 72 (Malta) Support Squadron RE on 30 September 1970, the Maltese Sappers ceased to serve alongside the British Royal Engineers and joined the Malta Land Force. Forming a 50-strong Engineer Troop within the MLF's Logistic Unit. The MLF would go on to be part of the Armed Forces of Malta.

== WW2 Uniforms and Equipment ==
During World War 2 the Fortress Squadron RE wore the same uniform as the British Army.

Make	Origin	Type
Khaki drill	United Kingdom	Summer uniform
Battle dress	United Kingdom	Winter uniform
Side cap	United Kingdom	Headgear
Brodie helmet	United Kingdom	Helmet
1937 pattern web equipment	United Kingdom	Webbing

== WW2 small arms ==
During World War 2 the RE used the same personal and crew-served weapons in service with the British Army.

Make	Origin	Type
Lee–Enfield (Mk III)	United Kingdom	Bolt-action rifle
Webley revolver	Britain	Service revolver
Bren light machine gun	United Kingdom	Light machine gun
Thompson submachine gun	United States	Submachine gun
Sten	United Kingdom	Submachine gun

The RE units on Malta used a range of UK/US manufactured support vehicles as general duties and logistics support.

== See also ==
- The King's Own Malta Regiment
- Royal Malta Artillery
- Siege of Malta (World War II)
- Fortifications of Malta
- Malta Dockyard
- Sliema Point Battery
- Fort Ricasoli
- Fort Campbell (Malta)
- Pembroke Battery
- Fort Pembroke
