= Pietà Military Cemetery =

Cemetery in Pietà, Malta

Pieta Military Cemetery
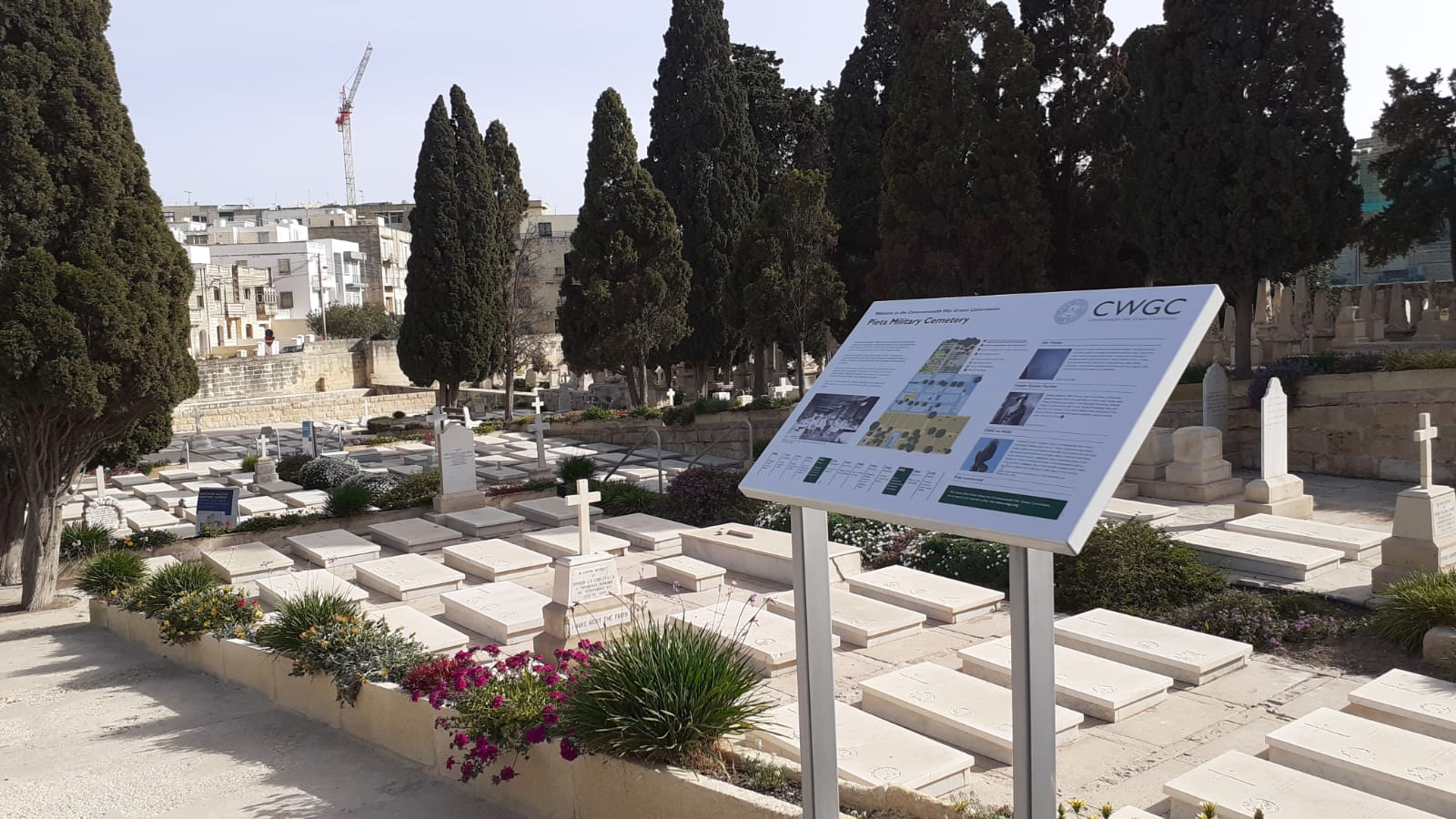
- The CWGC Seal
- Interactive map of Pieta Military Cemetery

Details
- Established: 1866
- Location: Pietà (near Valletta)
- Country: Malta GC
- Coordinates: 35°53′24″N 14°29′45″E
- Type: Military Cemetery and War Memorial
- Style: Single and group burials
- Owned by: Commonwealth War Graves Commission
- No. of graves: 1469
- No. of interments: 1469

Pietà Military Cemetery in Pietà, Malta, is a burial ground for military personnel and their dependants. It is located in the south western suburbs of Valletta, on a minor road (Triq id-Duluri). The following are cared for by the Commonwealth War Graves Commission (CWGC):

- 1303 First World War commonwealth casualties buried or commemorated at the Cemetery (including 20 Indian servicemen and labourers of the Indian Army who were cremated at Lazaretto Cemetery)
- 166 Second World War burials
- 772 non-war graves in the cemetery
- 15 war graves of other non-Commonwealth nationalities.

A large number of Australian and New Zealand service personnel are buried in the cemetery, the highest concentration on Malta.

The first British serviceman buried at the cemetery was a group of British soldiers buried in 1866. The majority of those interred and remembered at the cemetery are casualties of the two World Wars (but mainly the First World War), many in communal graves. The last identifiable servicemen or dependant buried at the site is hard to ascertain as this is a mixed civilian and military cemetery.

The cemetery did not escape the aerial bombardment that Valletta and its environs experienced in WW2, and in April 1941 a Bomb Disposal team was called to deal with eight UXBs that had impacted in the graveyard. The team successfully defused the bombs without incident.

Malta's CWGC Cemeteries became the centre of a controversy when the then Prime Minister of Malta Dom Mintoff was recorded as considering doing away with the island's war cemeteries in 1978; the threat was never carried out.

There are a number of CWGC graveyards and sites that are cared for by the British Government through the auspices of the CWGC and some of the larger collections of war graves can be found at the following locations:

- Pembroke Military Cemetery
- Capucinni Naval Cemetery (also known as Kalkara Naval Cemetery)
- Imtarfa Military Cemetery
- Malta Memorial – Valletta (not graves but commemorating those with no known grave)

== See also ==
- Siege of Malta (World War II)
