= Pembroke, Malta =

Pembroke
- Local council
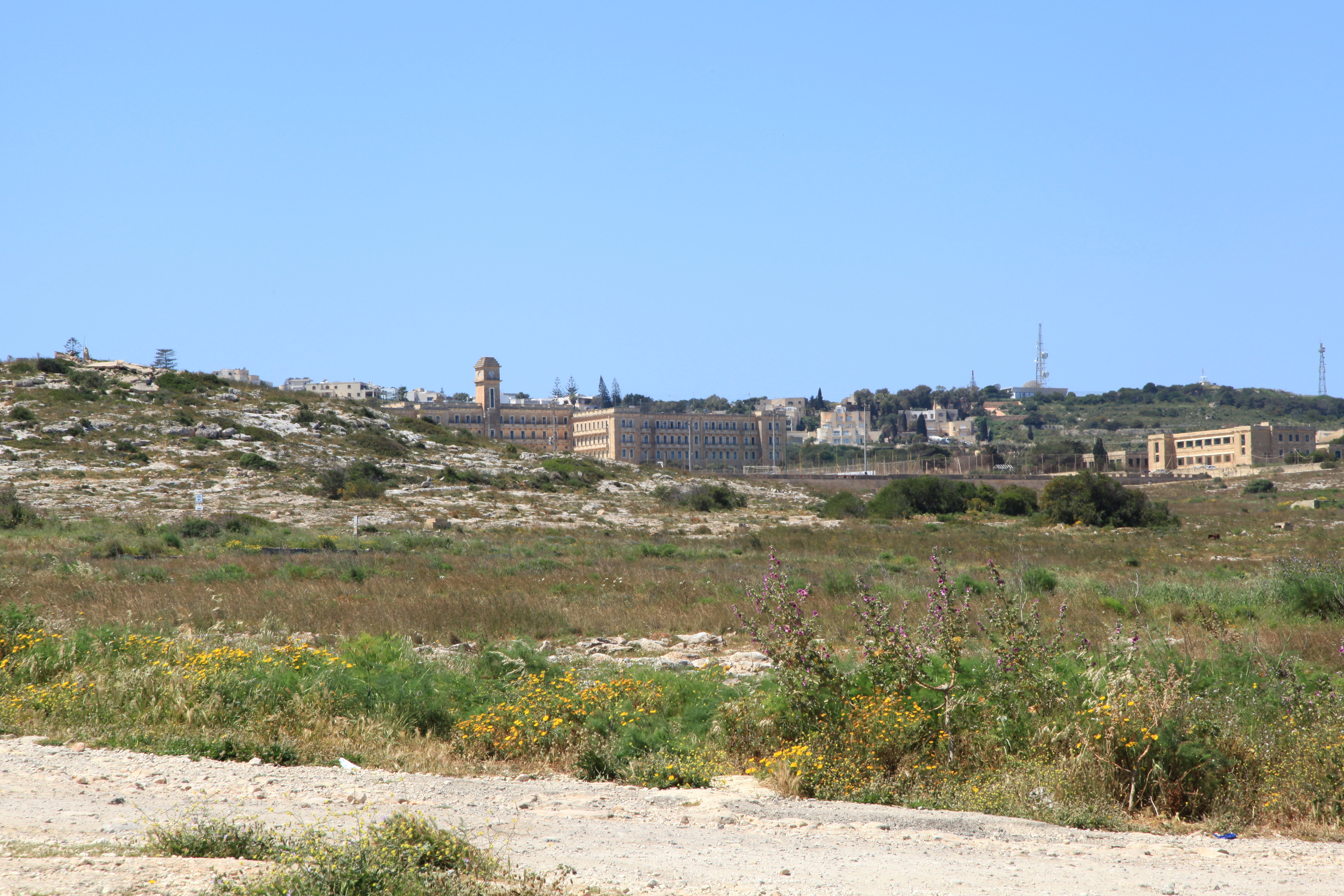
- Garrigue with Pembroke in the distance

- Flag Coat of arms

- Coordinates: 35°55′35″N 14°28′51″E
- Country: Malta
- Region: Eastern Region
- District: Northern Harbour District
- Borders: Naxxar, St. Julian's, Swieqi

Government
  - Mayor: Kaylon Zammit (PL)

Area
  - Total: 2.3 km^{2} (0.89 sq mi)
- Elevation: 64 m (210 ft)

Population (Jul 2024)
  - Total: 3,910
  - Density: 1,700/km^{2} (4,400/sq mi)
- Demonym(s): Pembrokjan (m), Pembrokjana (f), Pembrokjani (pl)
- Time zone: UTC+1 (CET)
  - Summer (DST): UTC+2 (CEST)
- Postal code: PBK
- Dialing code: 356
- ISO 3166 code: MT-40
- Patron saint: Resurrection of Christ
- Website: Official website

Pembroke is a town in the Eastern Region of Malta, and it is considered to be the country's newest locality. To the east is Paceville, the nightlife district of Malta. The coastal town and tourist hub of St. Julian's lies to the southeast, and the residential area of Swieqi lies to the south. The hilltop village of Madliena is to its west, and Baħar iċ-Ċagħaq lies to the northwest.

Pembroke covers an area of 2.3 km^{2} (0.89 sq mi). The area hugs a coastal zone with a rocky beach. The highest point lies at 64 meters (210 feet) above sea level (at Suffolk Road, exit to St. Andrew's Rd). Pembroke was formerly a British military base from the 1850s to 1979.

Pembroke is named after Robert Henry Herbert, the 12th Earl of Pembroke, and was authorised by Sidney Herbert, younger half-brother of Robert and the Secretary of State for War in 1859.

Pembroke was formerly part of St. Julian's. Pembroke officially became a town by virtue of the Local Councils Act (1993). This act recognised Pembroke as one of the 68 localities in Malta, with its own local council.

== Population ==
The town's population stood at 3,910 in July 2024. This included 1980 males and 1930 females; 3117 Maltese nationals and 793 foreign nationals.

By comparison, the town's population stood at 2,630 in 2001 of which 2,555 were Maltese nationals. As of 2013, Pembroke ranked as the 38th most populated locality. The population is quite young compared to the national average. Only 91 persons were over 70 years from a population of 3,488 in 2011. This represents 2% of the town's population compared to the national average of 10% for this age category. The average age of the Pembroke population is 33.5 years compared to the national average of 40.5 years.

The town's population has grown as follows;(NSO Demographic reviews)

1985: Nil
1995: 2,213
2001: 2,630 (inc. 2,555 Nationals)
2005: 2,806 (inc. 2,697 Nationals)
2010: 3,038 (inc. 2,925 Nationals)
2011: 3,488 (inc. 3,346 Nationals)
2014: 3,599 (inc. 3,428 Nationals)
2021: 3,545

(source NSO census 2021. Final Report published 16 February 2023)

The five most common surnames in Pembroke are Vella, Borg, Zammit, Camilleri and Galea. These five surnames alone account for 15% of the town's population.{NSO}

== History ==
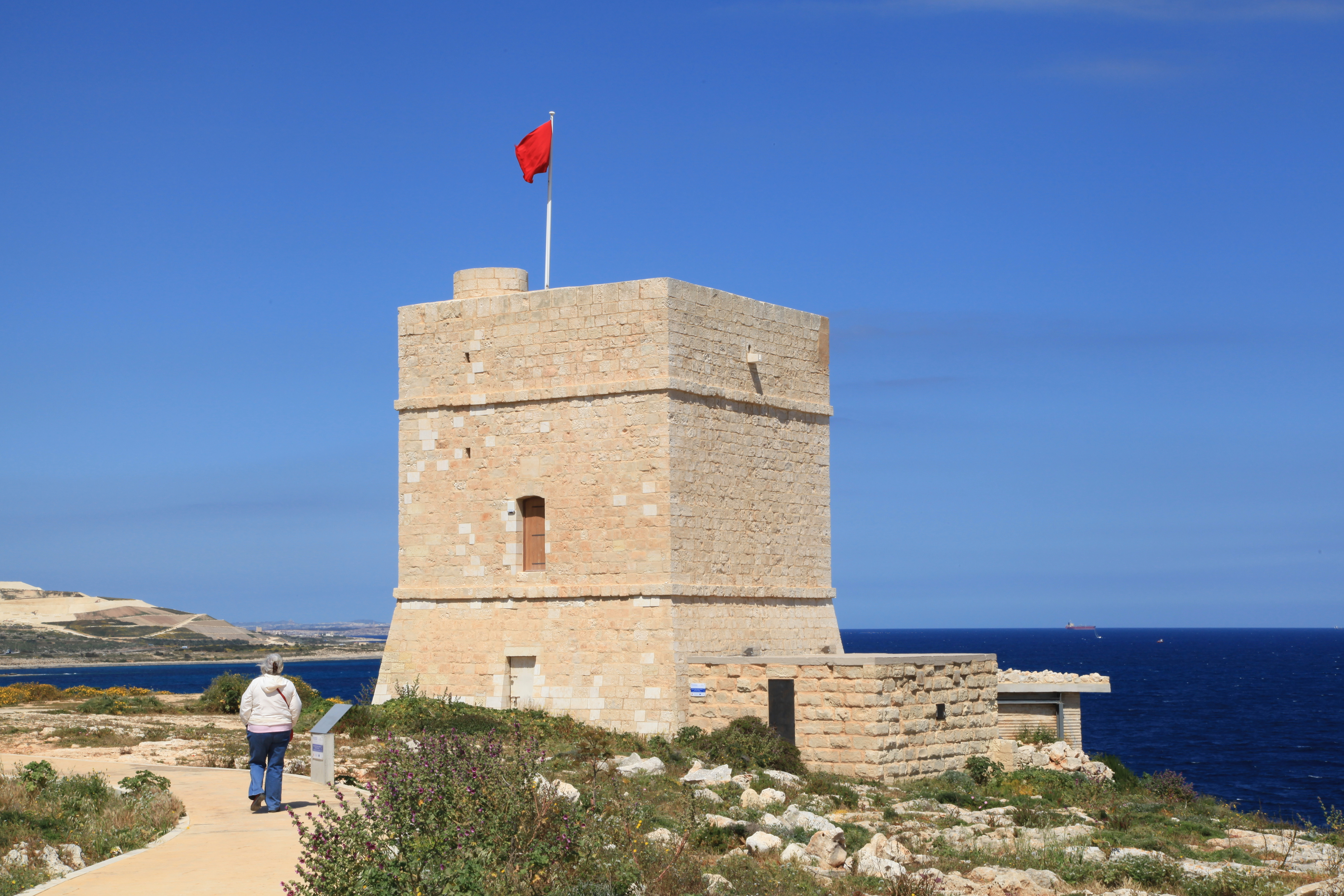
Madliena Tower

The first known buildings in the area of the town date back to the time of the Order of Saint John. The Knights built two watch towers on the extreme ends of the current Pembroke coast. The first of these is Saint George's Tower, which was built in 1638 as part of a series of coastal watch towers financed by Grandmaster Giovanni Paolo Lascaris. The second tower, Madliena Tower, forms part of a network of 13 coastal watch towers, collectively known as the De Redin towers, which were built between 1658 and 1659 during the reign of Grandmaster Martin de Redin to protect the then uninhabited northern coast of Malta. These 13 towers adorn the official coat of arms and flag of Pembroke, reflecting the town's military heritage.

However, it was the British who were instrumental in the development and fortification of Pembroke by building a military base complete with a hospital, cemetery, school, parade grounds, training grounds and shooting ranges. At this time, Pembroke formed part of Għargħur. Initially, troops were billeted in tents and the area was known as the Pembroke Cantonment. The first barracks were constructed between 1859 and 1862 overlooking St. George's Bay and were named after England's patron saint, St. George. Later, other barracks were built and were named after the patron saints of Ireland and Scotland, St. Patrick and St. Andrew. Fort Pembroke was built between 1875 and 1878 to safeguard the seaward approach towards the Grand Harbour situated approximately 6 km to the east, as well as to defend the right flank of the Victoria Lines. Its main armament comprised three 11-inch R.M.L. guns and one 64pr R.M.L. gun on a Moncrieff Mounting. The fort is surrounded by a ditch and glacis and contains underground magazines and casemated quarters for the garrison. The site now houses the Verdala International School. Between 1897 and 1899, Pembroke Battery was built nearby to serve the same purposes but housing newer guns with a longer range, protected by reinforced concrete emplacements. Pembroke Battery was armed with two 9.2-inch breech-loading MK X guns. Only one gun emplacement survives today, located between Burma Road and Dun Luigi Rigord Street.

The military heritage of Pembroke Army Garrison is still evident as several buildings from the British era survive to this day preserved as heritage structures. The Pembroke Military Cemetery marks the repose of 593 casualties, including 315 from World War II. The cemetery also houses the Pembroke Memorial which commemorates 52 servicemen of the Second World War whose graves are in other parts of Malta not falling under the care of the Commonwealth War Graves. Their names appear on marble plaques let into the plinth of the Cross of Sacrifice. The cemetery is open between Monday to Friday.

In 1915, during World War I, when Malta was an important hospital base for the British and Commonwealth troops in the Mediterranean Sea, the army built what was then called St. Andrew's Church Room. In 1932, plans for an extension to the Church Room were drawn up and funds were raised from civilians and supplemented by generous contributions from soldiers of both battalions quartered in Pembroke barracks. The church was known as the Christ Church Garrison Church. The service of dedication took place on 12 November 1933. The extension permitted over two hundred people to be seated comfortably. The building today houses the Athleta Sports Club at Burma Road.

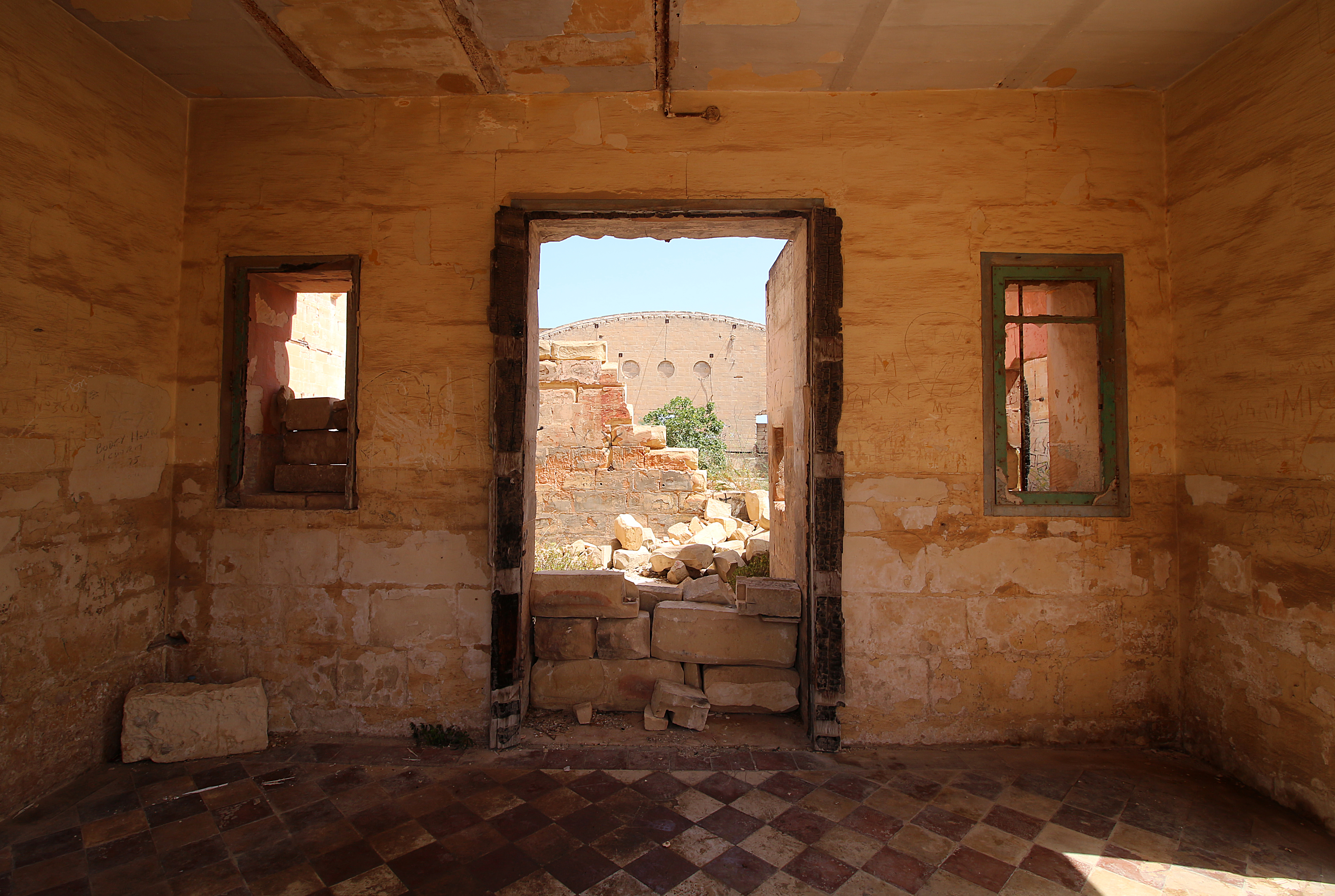
Australia Hall in Pembroke

In 1915, the Australian Branch of the British Red Cross Society collected funds for the building of Australia Hall, a recreation centre and theatre, to stand as a monument to the wounded ANZAC troops that were nursed in Malta. Unfortunately, the ceiling of trusses and sheeting was gutted by fire in December 1998 but its sturdy four walls still remain standing and are pending a restoration project.

During the Siege of Malta, in World War II, Pembroke did not escape unscathed and has borne the scars from its share of the bombardment. From June 1940, St. George's Barracks was used to house the families of naval staff in the hope that it was far enough away from the RN Dockyards to avoid bombing. In the later stages of the war, German prisoners of war were held in Pembroke's POW camp. By 1945 they reached 2500 prisoners and several of them were of Roman Catholic denomination. They built a small chapel which served the religious needs of the Catholic POWs. The chapel was formally blessed by the Archbishop of Malta Mikiel Gonzi in May 1946. During 1947, several prisoners were repatriated to Germany and on 9 February 1948, the last contingent of 787 Germans were embarked from Malta heading home to Germany. On 17 February 1948, No.1 (Malta) Prisoner of War Camp was officially disbanded.

In April 1960, the Italian Navy Rescue and Salvage ship Proteo came to Malta and collected the remains of 121 German and 79 Italian dead who had been buried in the Pembroke Military Cemetery. The ship sailed for Sardinia where the coffins were re-interred in the St. Michele Communal Cemetery, situated just outside the main town of Cagliari.

After the war, Pembroke hosted various regiments that formed the backbone of the Malta garrison and other regiments were posted here for training camps. Some of the barracks also hosted the families of those soldiers on longer postings. The British military base at Pembroke was run down in 1977 and the last British soldiers left Pembroke in 1979. On 16 March 1977, Earl Mountbatten of Burma, Admiral of the Fleet, took the salute as 41 Commando Royal Marines trooped the Regimental Colour at the parade ground by St Andrew's Barracks. This ceremony marked the beginning of the withdrawal of British Forces from Malta. Since then, all the land which had been acquired by the British during their period in Malta has been relinquished to the Maltese Government.

== Recent times ==
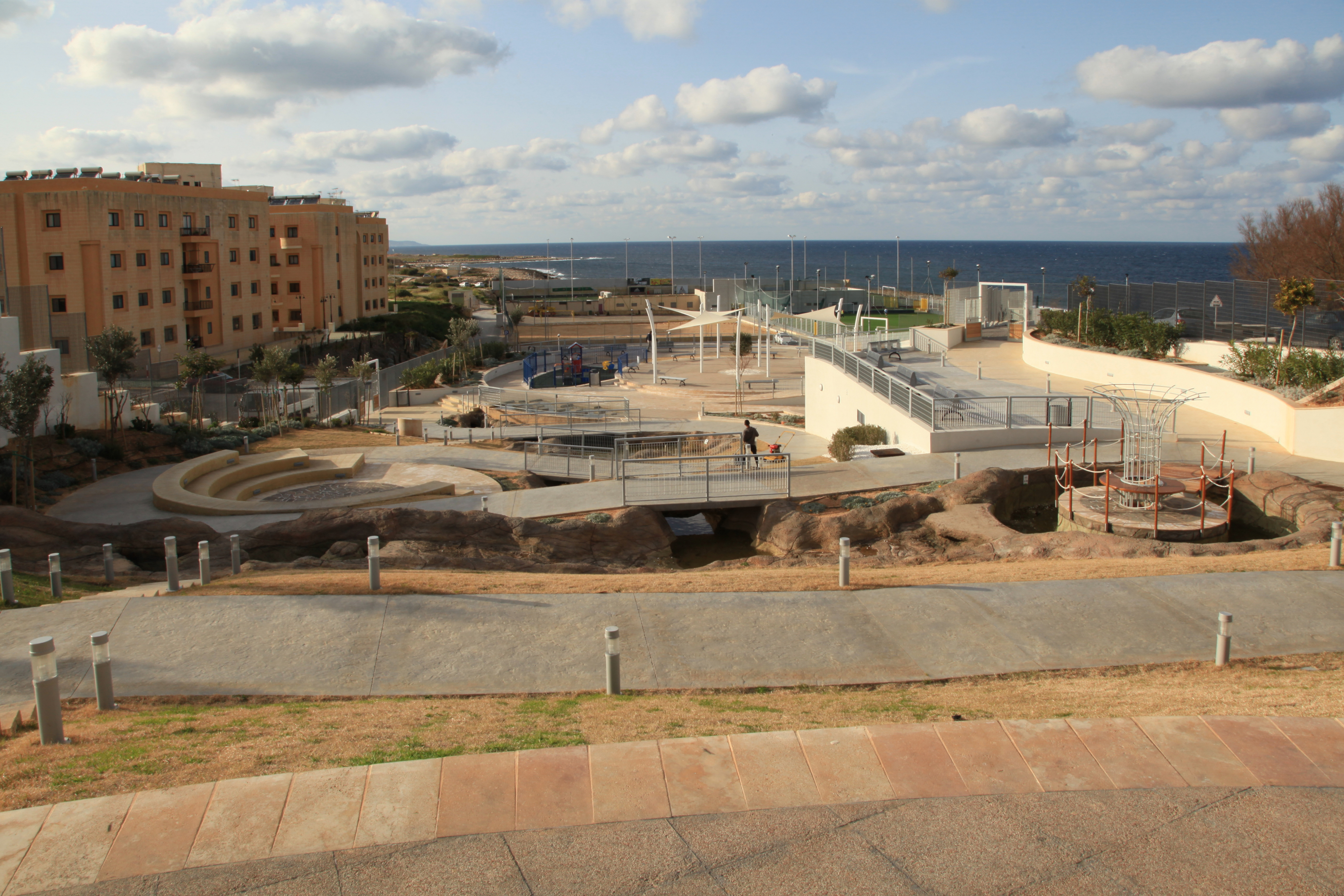
Pembroke Gardens, inaugurated in 2012

Pembroke remained neglected between 1979 and 1984. By the mid-1980s some of the former barracks were converted into housing projects. There was also a short-lived, large holiday complex which only lasted a few years (Medisle Village complex, including the Raffles discothèque and the Victoria Pub). On 4 July 1983, the Maltese Parliament approved a motion to commence issuing plots of land for sale/lease for the purpose of building residential houses. The first residents settled in 1986. In 1993, Pembroke was separated from St. Julian's and formally became a new town. Pembroke has since developed into a pleasant residential town and a rather green town by Maltese standards. It is popular with visiting language students particularly during the summer months.

The Archbishop of Malta declared Pembroke as a parish on 8 December 2004. Formerly, Pembroke fell within the parish of St. Julian's and later as an autonomous zone under Ibraġ. The parish is dedicated to the Resurrection of Christ. Unlike most towns and villages in Malta, Pembroke does not hold a village festa. The new church is built on the same site of the former small chapel erected in 1945 by German POWs.

The town is well known for hosting a high concentration of schools and educational institutions. The main schools are the following: St. Clare Primary and Secondary State Schools; St. Clare College Girls' Junior Lyceum (formerly Sir Adrian Dingli Junior Lyceum); St Patrick's Craft Centre; Verdala International School; Framingham State College; Sprachcaffe Languages Plus; St. Catherine's High School; Institute of Tourism Studies; St. Michael's Foundation; STC Training; San Miguel School and Middlesex University (Malta Campus).

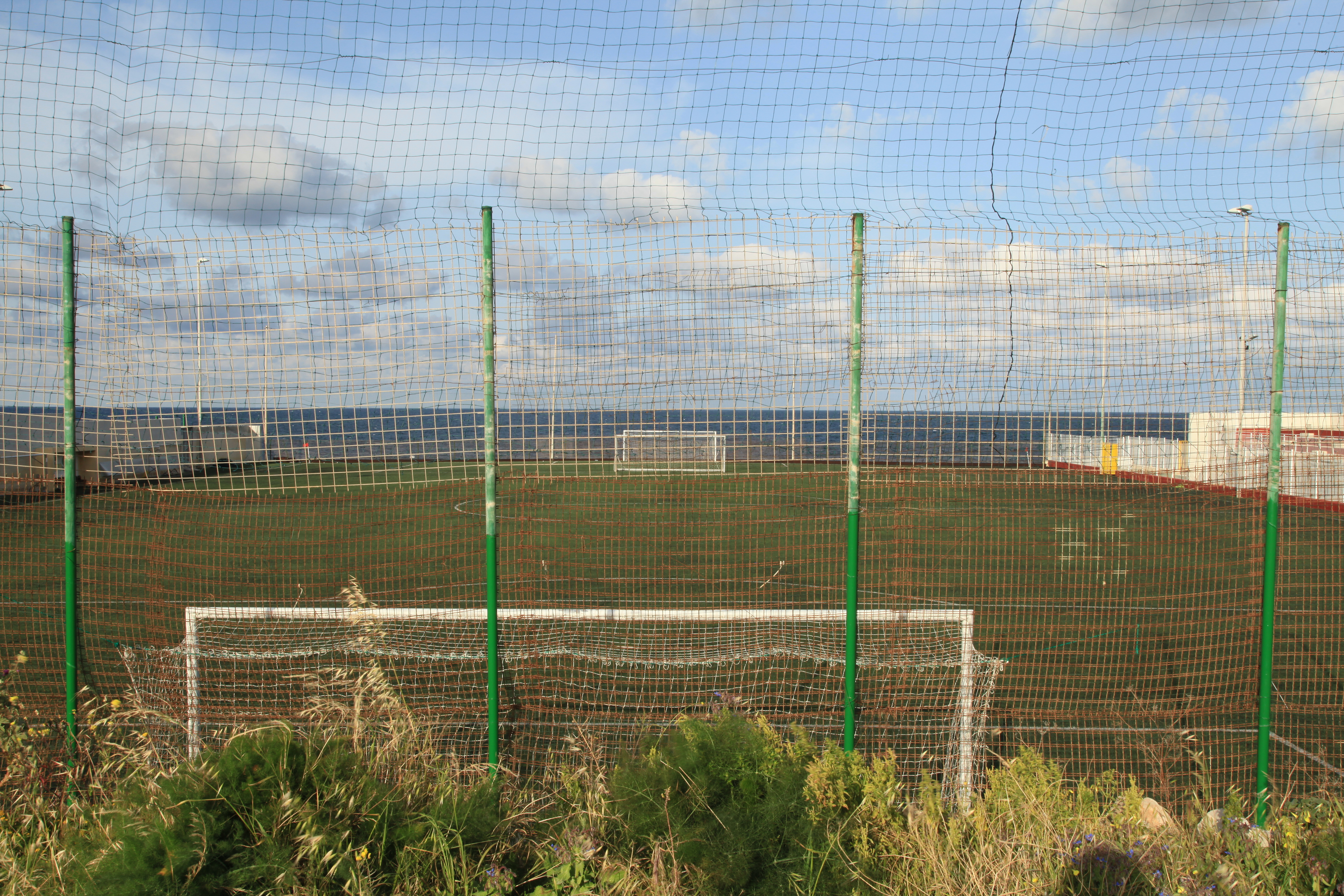
Pembroke Athleta Football Ground

Pembroke is also associated with sports. The Pembroke Athleta Football Club represents the town in the national league. Other clubs established in Pembroke include Pembroke Athleta Sports Club; Luxol Sports Club; Melita F.C.; Pembroke Rackets Tennis Club; Assoċjazzjoni tal-BMX; Judo Federation; Spinach Fitness Club and the Malta Archery Club.

The headquarters of the Malta Red Cross Society is located in Pembroke.

== Geology ==
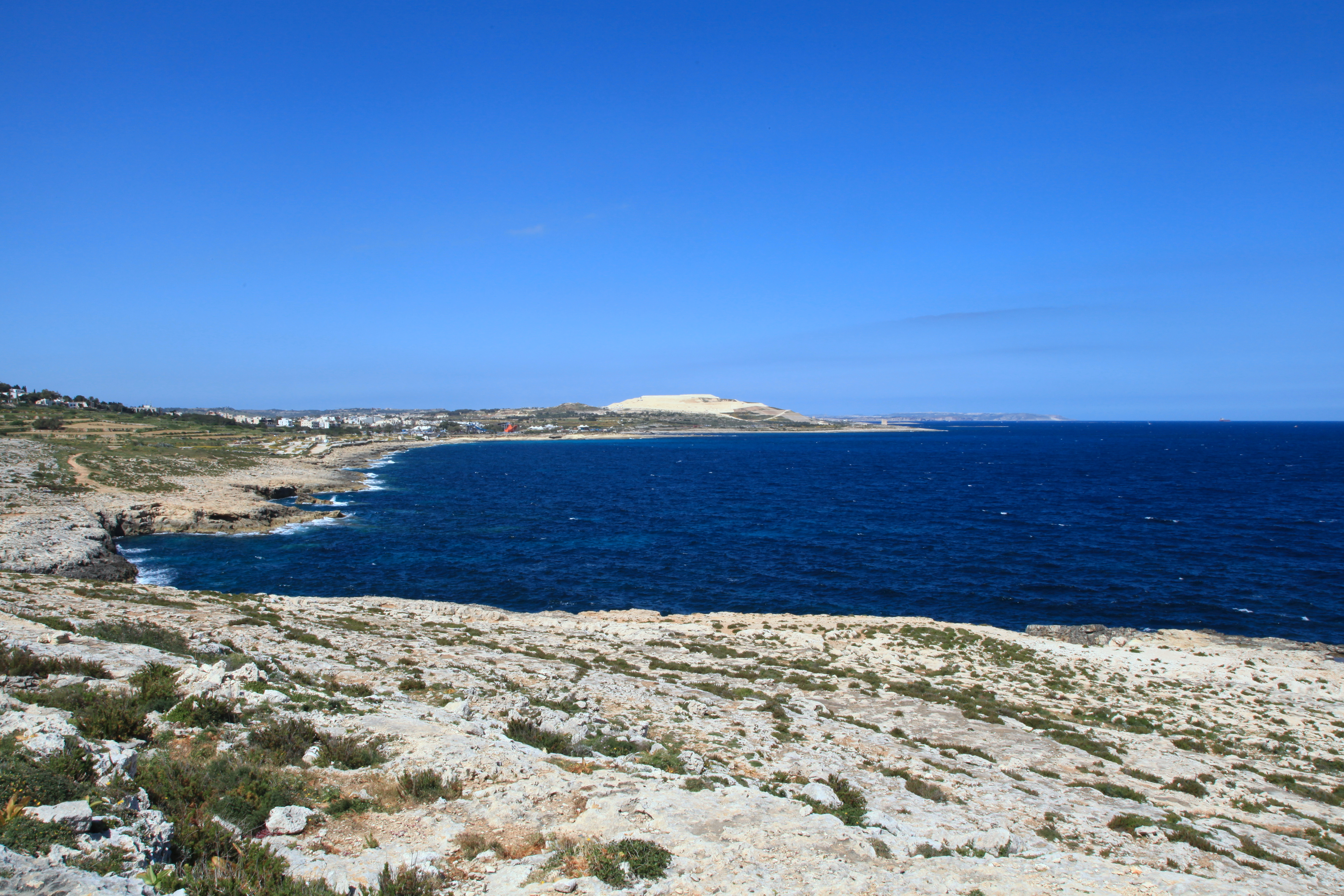
Pembroke's coastline, looking towards Baħar iċ-Ċagħaq and Magħtab

Pembroke has the last large expanse of karstland left in Malta, covering over 60 hectares of garigue. Endangered plants are still found in the area, the most important of these is the thorny salad-burnet (Maltese: Tursin il-għawl xewwieki). Aleppo pines (Maltese: Żnuber) dominate the forested areas. The coastal zone is designated a Special Area of Conservation (SAC). The rocky coast, watercourse and karstland surrounding and including the Pembroke rifle ranges are scheduled locally as 'Areas of Ecological Importance' and 'Sites of Scientific Importance', whereas the rifle ranges themselves are protected as historic structures. This garigue zone hugs the coast and is interrupted by the reverse osmosis plant, the largest such plant in Malta. The plant was purposely placed on the Pembroke coast due to the cleanliness of the pristine sea water in the area, free from any effluent or any agricultural run-off.

A geological feature unique in the Maltese archipelago is the large natural cavern at the Ħarq Ħammiem valley which separates Pembroke from St. Julian's. The large cavern tops a closed lake having a surface area of 300 square meters and is very deep. An underwater survey commissioned by the Maltese government in 2001 discovered the lake's depths were even deeper than previously assumed. The underwater formation consists of two large chambers interconnected by a corridor. The lower chamber is fully submerged. This unique feature is not well known as access to the cavern is blocked by a private enterprise and this irregular claim does not seem to be challenged by the authorities. In 2008, the Malta Environment and Planning Authority (MEPA) declared Ħarq Ħammiem cave and the valley system as an Area of Ecological Importance and Site of Scientific Importance.

== Twin towns – sister cities ==
Pembroke is twinned with:

- Pembroke Dock, Wales, United Kingdom (since 2002)
- Pembroke, Wales, United Kingdom (since 2002)
- Roccalumera, Sicily, Italy (since 2002)
- Auragne, Occitanie, France

== Zones in Pembroke ==
- Fort Pembroke (currently Verdala International School)
- Medisle Village (concentration of converted Barracks around Alamein Road)
- St. George Barracks (converted to housing)
- San Patrizju (St. Patrick's - converted to housing)
- St. Andrew's (converted to housing)
- White Rocks (abandoned building complex, pending re-development)
- Pembroke Parade Ground (now the Pembroke Park and Ride, formerly a heliport)
- The Ranges (part of which still in use by the Armed Forces of Malta)

== Pembroke main roads ==
- Triq Camillo Sceberras (C. Sceberras Street)
- Triq Cassino (Cassino Street)
- Triq Falaise (Falaise Road)
- Triq G. Scibberas (G. Scibberas Street)
- Triq il-Fortizza (Fort Street)
- Triq Alamein (Alamein Road)
- Triq il-Mediterran (Mediterranean Street)
- Triq in-Normandija (Normandy Road)
- Triq Sant' Andrija (St Andrew's Road)
