= Pembroke Military Cemetery =

Cemetery in former Pembroke Army Garrison, Malta

- Interactive map of Pembroke Military Cemetery

Details
- Established: 1908
- Location: Former Pembroke Army Garrison
- Country: Malta
- Coordinates: 35°55′45″N 14°28′13″E
- Type: Military Cemetery and War Memorial
- Style: Single and group burials
- Owned by: Commonwealth War Graves Commission
- No. of graves: 697
- No. of interments: 697

Pembroke Military Cemetery Malta is a burial ground for military personnel and their dependants. It is located close by the former St Patrick's Barracks (now St Clare's College) in the Pembroke Council area, on a minor road (Triq Adrian Dingli).

The majority of those interred and remembered at the cemetery are casualties of the two World Wars (but mainly the Second World War), many in communal graves. There are a total of 324 war graves associated with First and Second World Wars; the CWGC also maintains 273 non-war graves. One group of graves and a memorial was erected to remember the Maltese servicemen of the Malta Fortress Squadron, Royal Engineers who died instantly and later of their injuries when their RAF Hastings airplane crashed at El Adem Airfield in Libya on 10 October 1961. Many other Maltese servicemen are buried in the cemetery. Malta's CWGC Cemeteries became the centre of a controversy when the then Prime Minister of Malta Dom Mintoff was recorded as considering doing away with the island's war cemeteries in 1978; the threat was never carried out.

There are a number of CWGC graveyards and sites that are cared for by the British Government through the auspices of the CWGC and some of the larger collections of war graves can be found at the following locations:

- Pieta Military Cemetery
- Capucinni Naval Cemetery (also known as Kalkara Naval Cemetery)
- Imtarfa Military Cemetery
- Malta Memorial - Valletta (not graves but commemorating those with no known grave)

== See also ==
- Pembroke Army Garrison
- Siege of Malta (World War II)
