= Australia Hall =

Former theatre and cinema in Pembroke, Malta

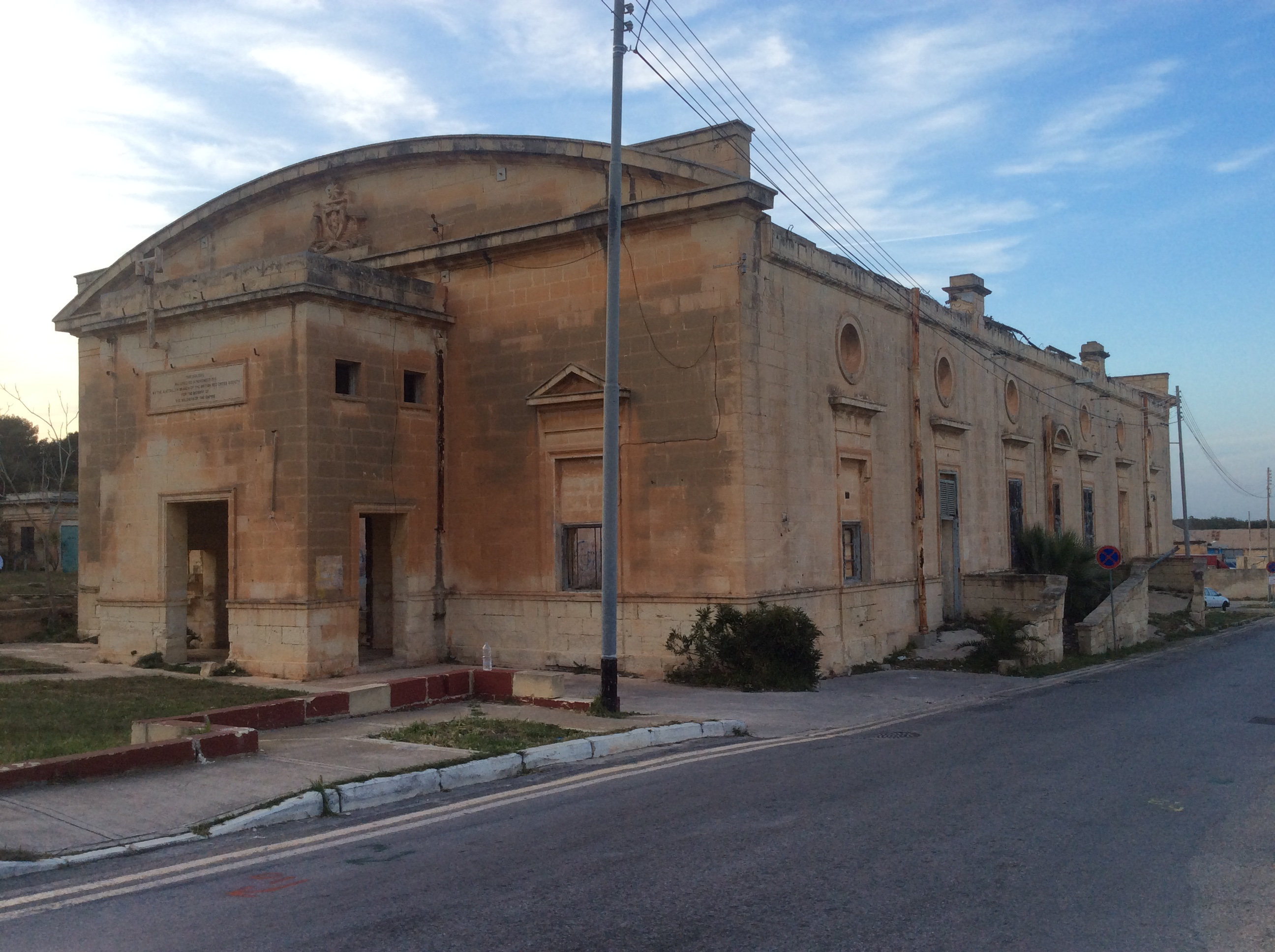
- View of Australia Hall

General information
- Status: Ruins (façade is intact)
- Type: Entertainment hall (including a theatre and cinema), with 6,000 sq m gardens
- Location: Pembroke, Malta
- Coordinates: 35°55′32.4″N 14°28′29.1″E
- Completed: November 1915
- Opened: 22 January 1916
- Destroyed: December 1998
- Client: Australian Branch of the British Red Cross Society
- Owner: A. H. Development Ltd

Technical details
- Material: Limestone

Australia Hall is a former entertainment hall in Pembroke, Malta, which was built by the Australian Branch of the British Red Cross Society in 1915. The building burnt down in 1998, and only its roofless shell remains today, awaiting redevelopment.

== History ==
Australia Hall was built by the Australian Branch of the British Red Cross Society as an entertainment venue for wounded soldiers of the Australian and New Zealand Army Corps who were being treated in Malta during World War I. The hall was built in November 1915, and was officially opened on 22 January 1916 by Governor Paul Methuen. The hall could accommodate up to 2000 people, and it was used as a theatre, and also included a library. The building was subsequently used by the Navy, Army and Air Force Institutes, and it also served as a cinema after 1921.

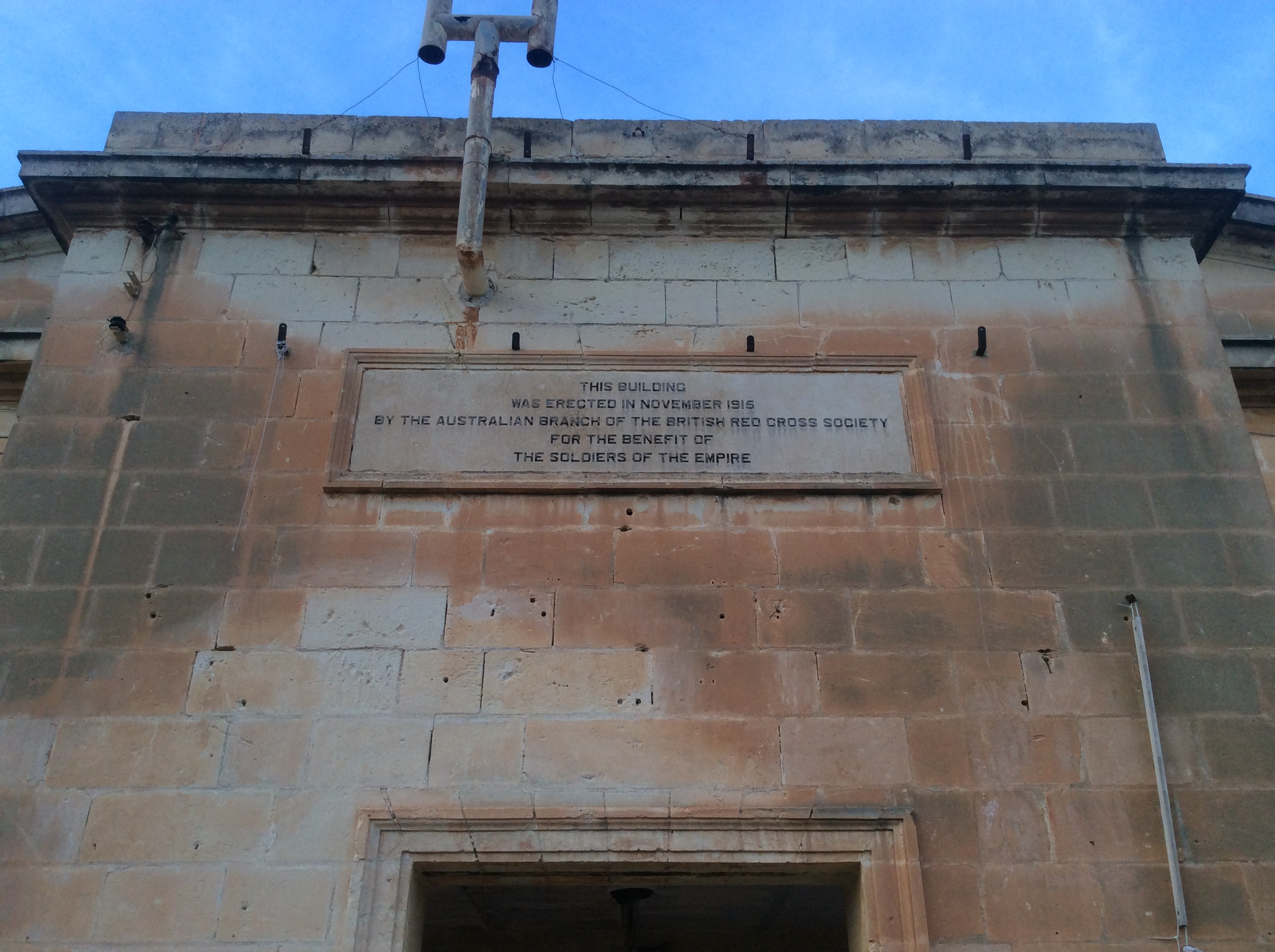
Plaque on front façade

In 1978, the British military vacated Pembroke, and the hall became property of the Government of Malta. A year later, the building was transferred to the Malta Labour Party in exchange for some property in Marsa.

In 1996, the hall was listed as a Grade 2 National Monument by the Malta Environment and Planning Authority. The building burnt down in December 1998, possibly in an arson attack. The fire destroyed the hall's roof and interior, but its roofless masonry shell is still intact, although it has been vandalized and its walls are covered in graffiti.

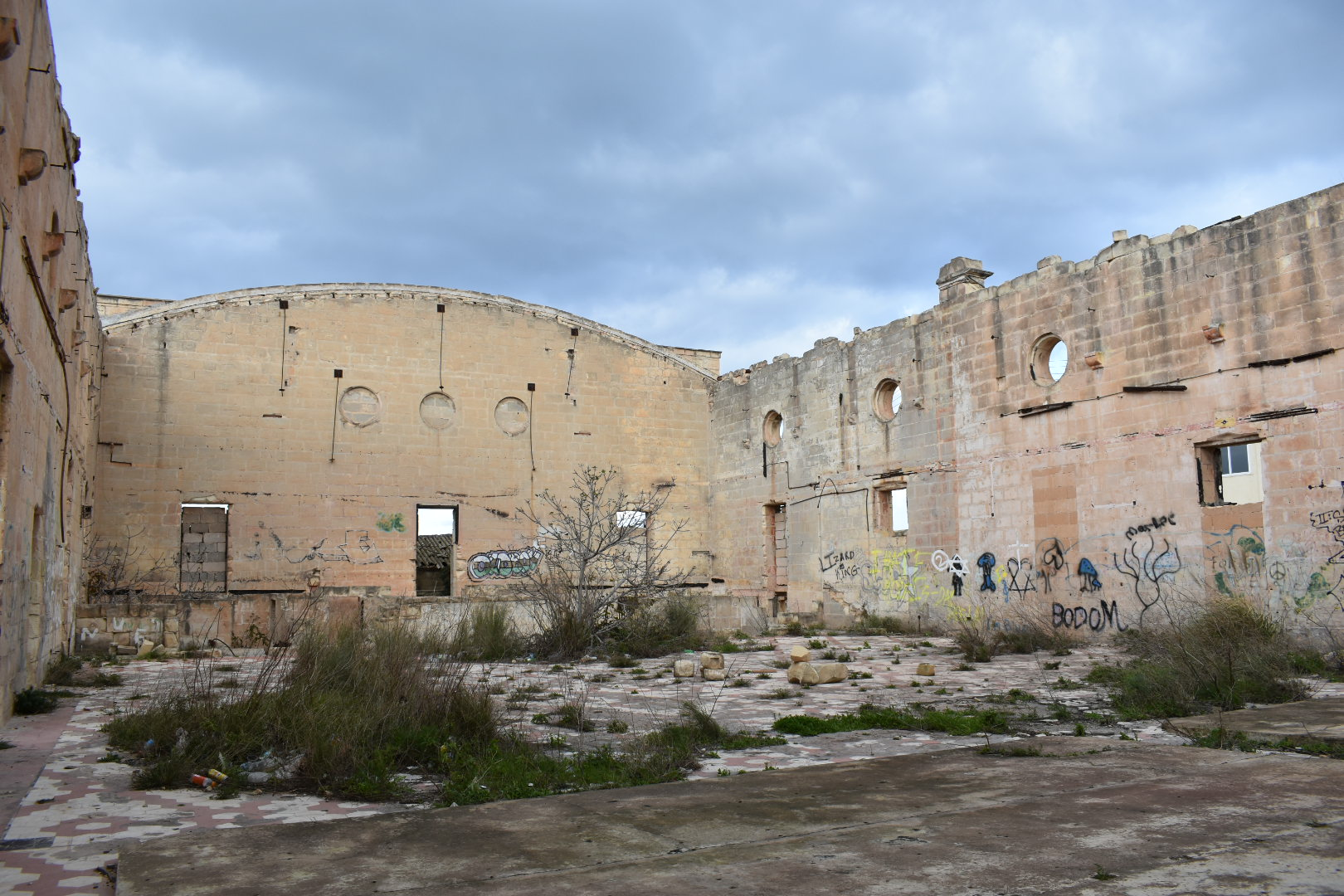
The roofless Australia Hall and its ruins in 2017

In 2010, the Labour Party was taken to court since it did not keep the hall in good condition, as was agreed upon in the 1979 contract. The charges were dropped in October 2013, when the Labour Party was in government. In 2014, the Labour Party sold the hall and some surrounding land to A. H. Development Ltd for a sum of €582,343. This amount was described as "grossly far off the current market price" by property agents, and the sale of the building has been described as controversial. This has resulted in a court case, with the Labour Party appealing that it is exempt from paying the tax on the sale. It is estimated that the Australia Hall together with the surrounding gardens are actually worth €5.5 million.

In 2016, Australian High Commissioner Jane Lambert called for Australia Hall's restoration, and she is in contact with the building's owners, discussing possibilities for how to develop the site.

There are plans to destroy the flora and fauna around the Australia Hall to build a massive embassy for China. The move promoted criticism amongst residents and the general public for the take over of the open space which is owned by China. 19,000 sq metres will be developed and closed to public access. The mega project will be out of context of the historic environment of the Australia Hall.

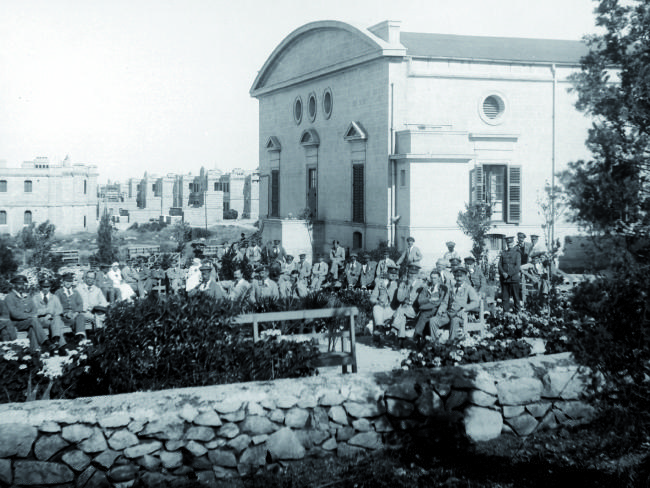

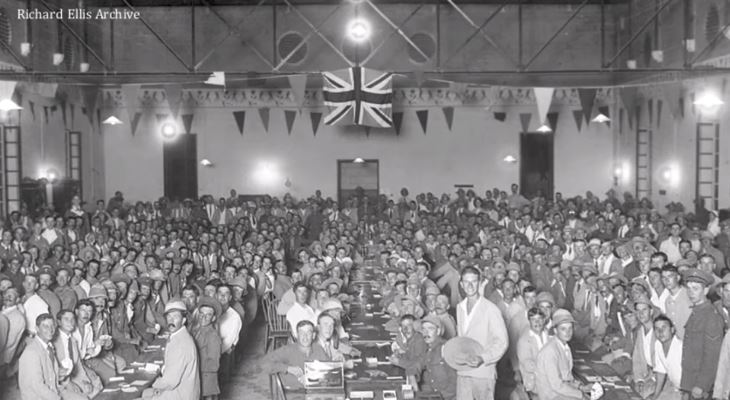

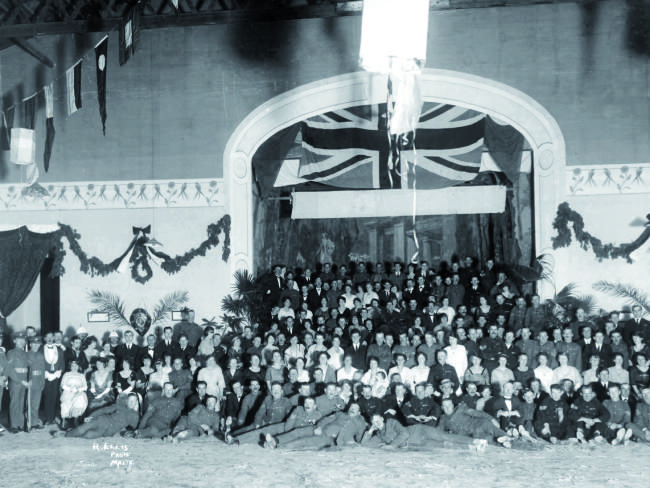

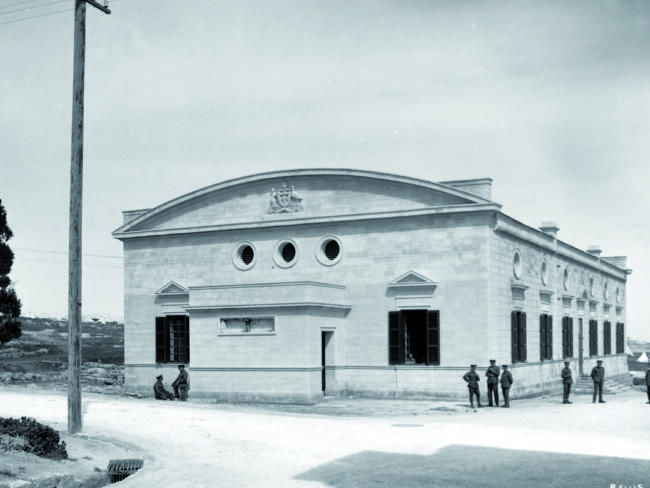
