= Fort Pembroke =

Polygonal fort in Malta

- Il-Fortizza ta' Pembroke
- Part of the Victoria Lines
- Pembroke, Malta
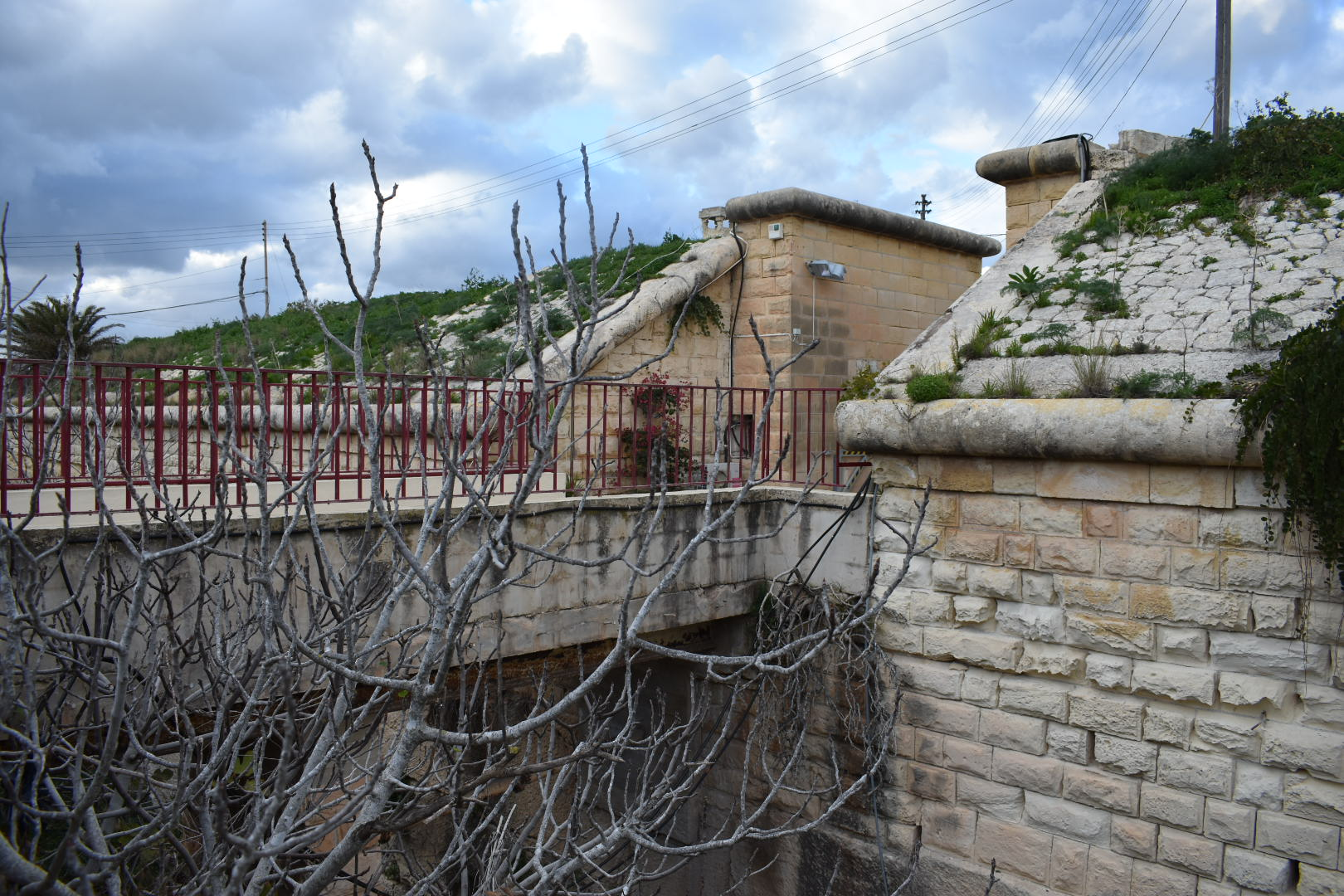
- Entrance to Fort Pembroke

Site information
- Type: Polygonal fort
- Owner: Government of Malta
- Controlled by: Verdala International School
- Condition: Intact

Location
- Coordinates: 35°55′37.0″N 14°28′51.8″E

Site history
- Built: 1875–1878
- Built by: British Empire
- In use: 1878–1978
- Materials: Limestone and concrete

Fort Pembroke (Maltese: Il-Fortizza ta' Pembroke) is a polygonal fort in Pembroke, Malta. It was built between 1875 and 1878 by the British to defend part of the Victoria Lines. The fort now houses the Verdala International School.

== History ==
Fort Pembroke was built by the British to defend the Grand Harbour as well as part of the Victoria Lines. The building of the fort was proposed in a defence committee recommendation in 1873, and construction took four years, starting on 24 January 1875 and finishing in December 1878. The fort has an elongated hexagonal shape, surrounded by a ditch and glacis. It contained underground magazines and casemated garrison quarters. It was armed with three RML 11 inch 25 ton guns and one 64-pounder gun, which were mounted en barbette.

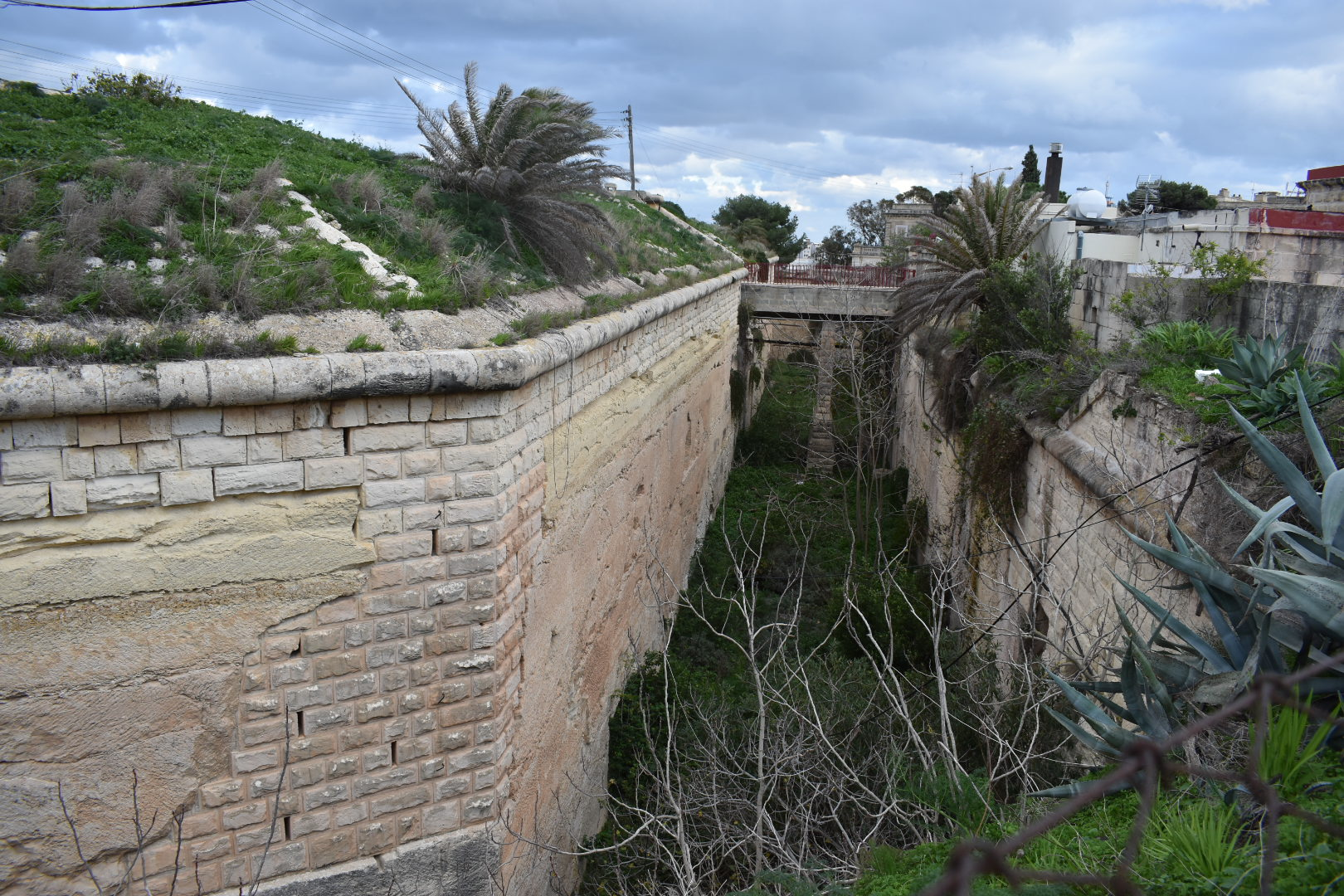
Fort Pembroke ditch

By the mid-1890s, the fort's armament became obsolete, and instead of upgrading, the nearby Pembroke Battery was built. The fort became an ammunition depot and storage area for small arms ammunition. Its gate was widened and a fixed metal bridge replaced the original rolling bridge.

In World War II, the fort was used as a prisoner-of-war camp, housing German prisoners.

The British military establishments in Pembroke were closed in 1978 and the limestone-and-concrete fort remained unused for nine years until 1987.

=== Present day ===
Verdala International School moved to the fort from Fort Verdala in 1987. Since then, the school has grown from 110 students to over 500 in 2024. Due to this increase, the school has expanded to include some barrack blocks close to the fort. The campus is leased by the government to the school until 2072.

The fort was scheduled by the Malta Environment and Planning Authority (MEPA) as a Grade 1 national monument in 1996. The protection status was revised to include the surviving glacis of the fort in 2009.
