= Pembroke Battery =

- Batterija ta' Pembroke
- Pembroke, Malta
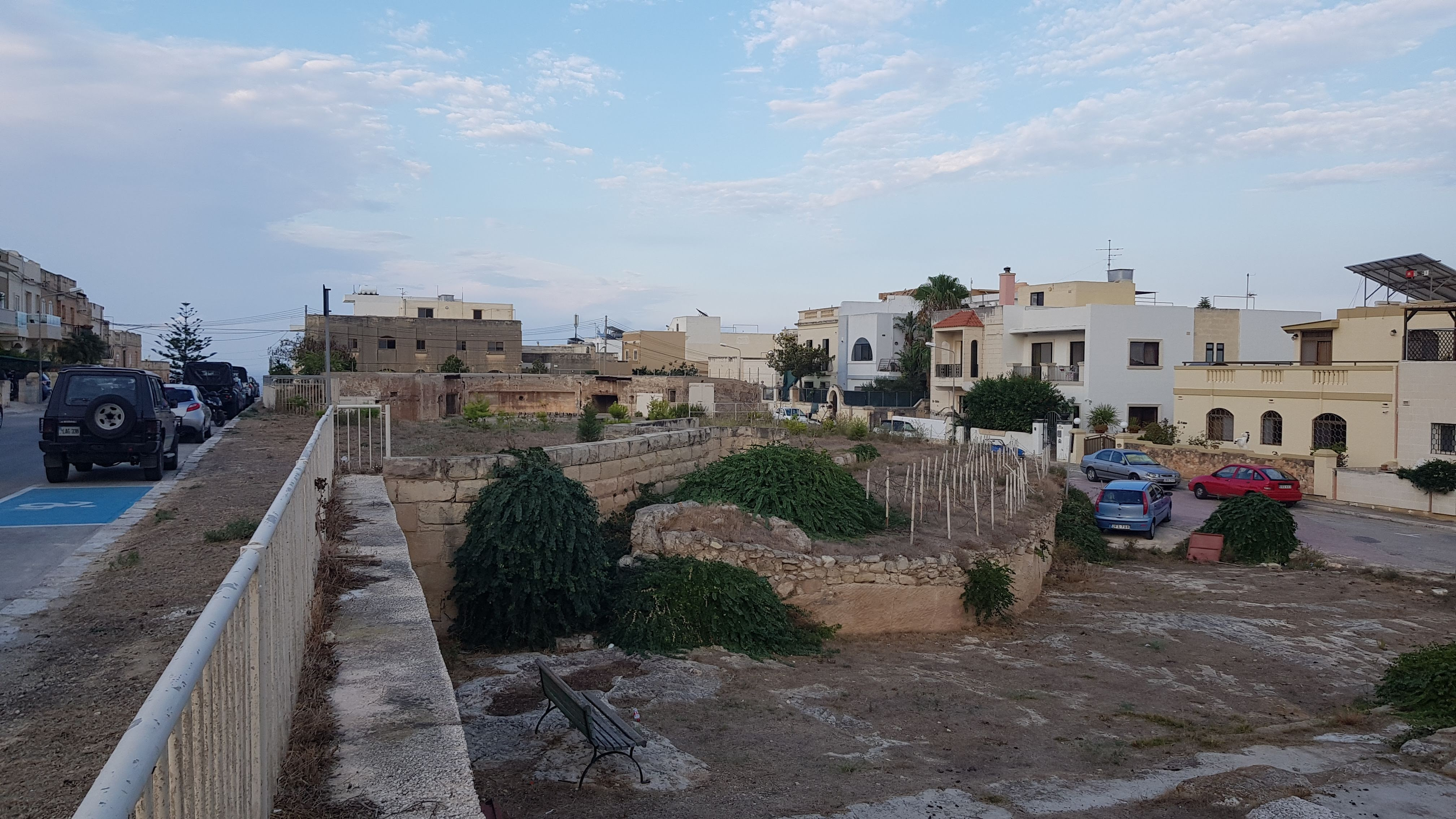
- The remains of Pembroke Battery in 2019

Site information
- Type: Artillery battery

Location
- Coordinates: 35°55′38.2″N 14°29′02.1″E

Site history
- Built: 1897–1899
- Built by: British Empire
- In use: 1899–1919
- Materials: Concrete
- Fate: Partially demolished in the mid-1980s

Pembroke Battery (Maltese: Batterija ta' Pembroke) was an artillery battery in Pembroke, Malta. It was built by the British between 1897 and 1899, and most of it was demolished in the 1980s.

== History ==
By the mid-1890s, the RML armament of the nearby Fort Pembroke had become obsolete, and that fort was turned into an ammunition depot. The British decided that it would be cheaper to construct a new battery rather than upgrade the fort's guns. Pembroke Battery was built between 1897 and 1899, and it formed part of a new series of fortifications meant to house breech-loading (BL) guns.

The battery was oval in shape, and its magazines and other features were located underground. It was surrounded by a ditch and a glacis, which was defended by barbed wire. It was armed with two 9.2 inch Mk X guns, which were mounted en barbette. These were dismantled in 1919 and the battery was struck off the armaments list. The battery remained unused until the 1980s.

== Present day ==
The western gun emplacement and part of the battery's underground complex were demolished in the 1980s during a housing expansion project. All that remains of Pembroke Battery today is a single reinforced concrete semi-circular gun emplacement, and remains of some of the other structures at the rear.

The Pembroke Local Council and the Malta Environment and Planning Authority (MEPA) are currently restoring the remains of the battery to transform it into a museum.
