= Villa di Mondeggi =

Villa in Bagno a Ripoli, Italy

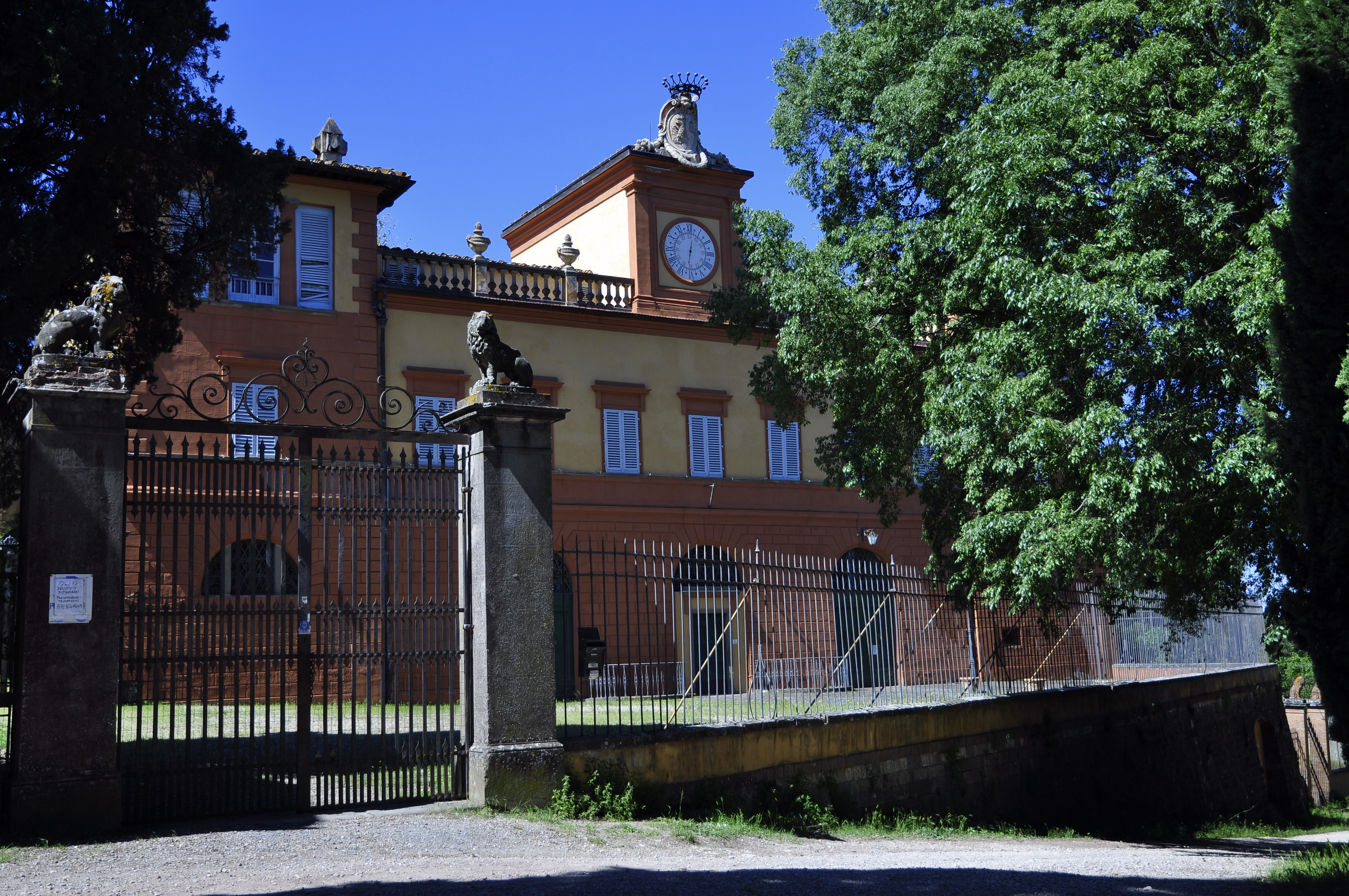
- Villa di Mondeggi, facade
- Interactive map of the Villa di Mondeggi area

General information
- Status: Completed
- Type: Villa
- Location: Mondeggi Street, Bagno a Ripoli
- Coordinates: 43°42′16″N 11°19′04″E
- Year built: 14th century
- Owner: Province of Florence

The Villa di Mondeggi is a villa located south to Florence (Italy), on the territories of the cities of Bagno a Ripoli, Impruneta and Greve in Chianti. Since 2014, the arable land, olive groves and some of the buildings are occupied by a group reclaiming the land to be managed in accordance with the principles of the commons.

== History ==
First written traces about the villa came from the monks of Vallombrosa Abbey and indicate a probable construction during the 14th century. The first known owners were the Bardi family from Florence who, in 1427, sold the villa to the Portinai family, who, in turn, offered the villa to the hospital of Santa Maria Nuova in 1488. The villa was bought by the della Gherardesca family in 1538. In 1610, a private chapel was built but the cult practice was authorised only 45 years later, by Pope Alexander VII. A public chapel was built in 1710. In 1862, the count Ugolino delle Gherardesca ordered works of enlargement and embellishment by the architects Angelo Foggi and Vincenzo Buffi. Internal decoration was made by Olimpio Bandinelli. In 1938, the della Gherardesca family sold the villa, which, after passing through two other private owners, was bought by the province of Florence in 1964. The arable land, vineyards and olive groves were, from this time, exploited by a public agricultural company.

=== Mondeggi Bene Comune ===
Until the 2000s, the villa and the 200 ha of land surrounding it were managed by a public company, owned by the province of Florence. In 2009, the company was put into liquidation and the land and trees were left abandoned. In 2012, the province announced that both the villa and the land would be sold the following year.

At the same time, the Italian debt crisis led the Monti cabinet to authorise the sale of 320,000 ha of public agricultural land. To oppose this measure, the peasant movement Genuino Clandestino launched the Terra Bene Comune campaign. One of the campaign's proposals is to occupy abandoned public land to develop peasant, agro-ecological and self-managed agriculture. In 2013, the Florentine committee of Terra Bene Comune identify the Mondeggi villa as one of the possible places to carry out this project. At the beginning of November 2013, during a meeting of Genuino Clandestino, the campaign "Mondeggi Bene Bene Comune Fattoria Senza Padroni" was launched, which aims to recover the entire farm and convert it to peasant agriculture. A few days later, the committee "Verso Mondeggi Bene Comune - Fattoria senza Padroni" was created, composed of inhabitants of the surrounding municipalities.

In the same month, the committee carried out its first action. The olives were harvested from the abandoned olive trees on the farm, and the olive oil was distributed free of charge. In January 2014, a Charter of Principles and Intentions was drafted. The occupants declared their intention to undertake a process of conversion from the status of abandoned public property to the status of common.

In spring 2014, a collective garden was created. In June 2014, three days of celebration were organised. On this occasion, one of the six houses (a "casa colonica") located on the farm's territory was open and occupied. In November 2014, the MoTA (Mondeggi Terreni Autogestiti) project began, which aims to allocate olive groves to those who wish to take care of them.

Discussions were initiated at the beginning of the year with the local authorities, but in May 2014, the province and the municipality of Bagno a Ripoli, in whose territory the majority of the land is located, confirmed their desire to sell the farm. In October 2014, the auction failed, due to a lack of buyers.

In 2017, the villa's furniture and agricultural equipment were put up for sale by the Metropolis of Florence (heir to the province), as a prelude to the sale of the villa and the land in a single lot.

Still in 2017, a Civic Declaration of Use was drafted by the occupants, to serve as a basis for dialogue with the administrations (province and municipality). According to the occupants' legal interpretation, this declaration makes them a "community", a legal personality recognizable by the authorities. This interpretation is inspired by the example of the former Asilo Filangieri of Naples.

The entire villa and land was put up for sale in 2019 but, again, did not find a buyer. In 2019, Mondeggi was removed from the list of properties for sale by the metropolis. The metropolis says it is open to the discussion of opportunities other than sales and declare to be waiting for the drafting of a regulation of common goods by its services.

== Description ==
The park is about 200 ha of vineyards, olive groves, woods, grassland and arable land. It includes 6 case coloniche (sharecropper's homes). Two hiking trails have been implemented by the province in 2011.
