= Cosimo Nannini =

Italian footballer (born 1999)

Personal information
- Date of birth: 4 January 1999 (age 27)
- Place of birth: Bagno a Ripoli, Italy
- Height: 1.83 m (6 ft 0 in)
- Position: Left-back

Team information
- Current team: Montevarchi
- Number: 6

Youth career
- –2016: Fiorentina
- 2016–2017: Prato

Senior career*
| Years | Team | Apps | (Gls) |
| 2017–2018 | Prato | 0 | (0) |
| 2017–2018 | → Sangiovannese (loan) | 37 | (4) |
| 2018–2021 | Bari | 25 | (1) |
| 2019–2020 | → Piacenza (loan) | 13 | (1) |
| 2020–2021 | → Lecco (loan) | 13 | (0) |
| 2021–2022 | Lucchese | 30 | (0) |
| 2022–2023 | Arzignano | 2 | (0) |
| 2023– | Montevarchi | 0 | (0) |
- * Club domestic league appearances and goals as of 22 April 2023

Cosimo Nannini (born 4 January 1999) is an Italian professional footballer who plays as a left-back for Serie D club Montevarchi.

== Club career ==
Born in Bagno a Ripoli, Nannini was formed in the Fiorentina and Prato youth systems. He made his debut in 2017–18 Serie D for Sangiovannese, and later signed for Bari. Nannini was loaned to Lecco for the 2020–21 season.

On 11 August 2021, he signed a two-year contract with Lucchese.

On 29 August 2022, Nannini moved to Arzignano.
