= 91st Light Anti-Aircraft Regiment, Royal Artillery =

12th Battalion, South Staffordshire Regiment 91st Light Anti-Aircraft Regiment, RA
- Cap badge of the Royal Artillery
- Active: 22 April 1940 – 18 December 1944
- Country: United Kingdom
- Branch: British Army
- Role: Infantry; Air defence
- Size: Battalion; Regiment
- Part of: 4th Division
- Engagements: Operation Vulcan; Operation Diadem; Trasimene Line; Operation Olive

The 91st Light Anti-Aircraft Regiment, Royal Artillery, (91st LAA Rgt) was an air defence unit of the British Army during World War II. Initially raised as an infantry battalion of the South Staffordshire Regiment in 1940, it transferred to the Royal Artillery in late 1941. It served with 4th Infantry Division in Tunisia and Italy until it was disbanded at the end of 1944.

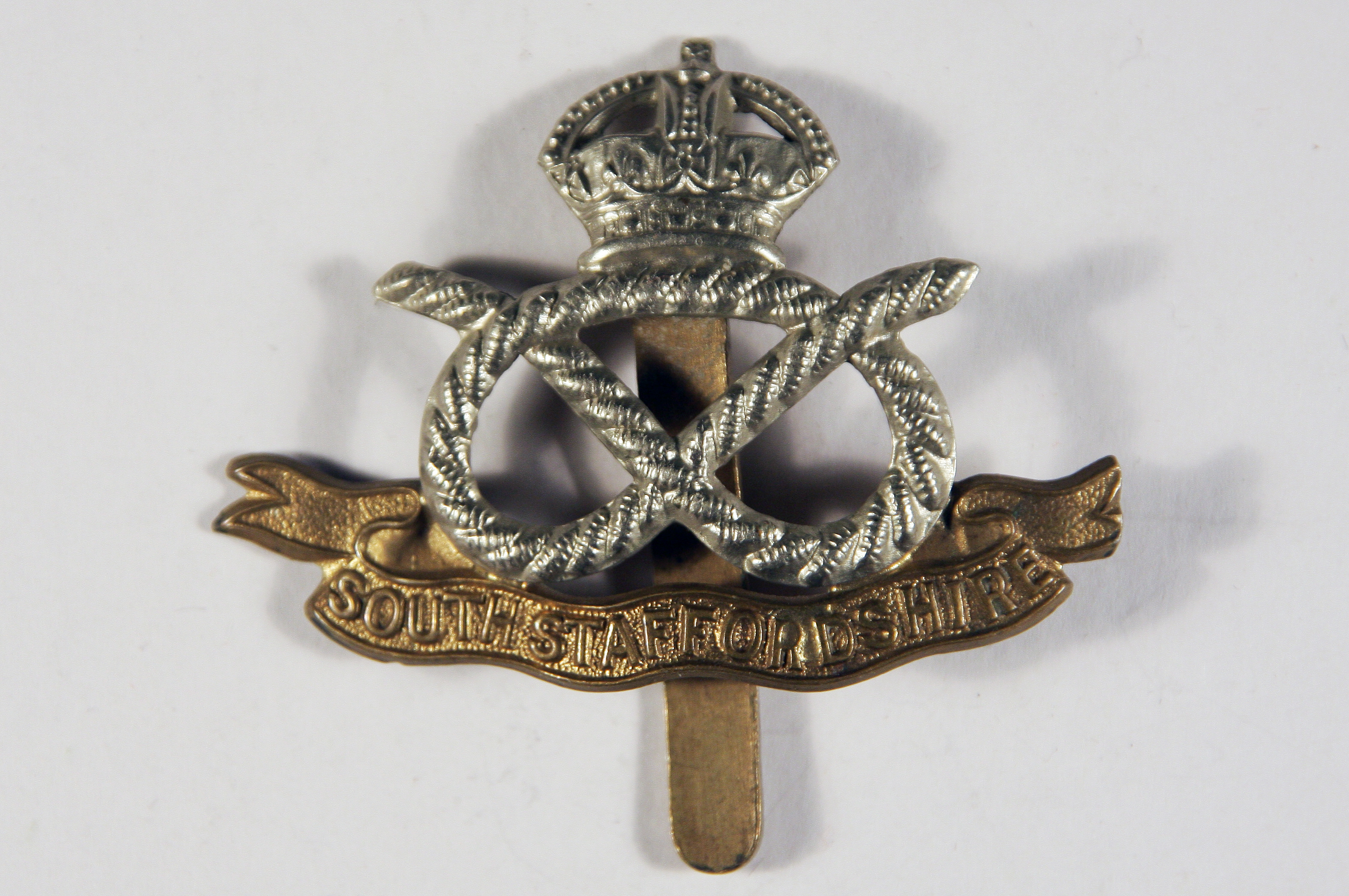
The South Staffordshires' cap badge.

== 12th (Pioneer) Battalion, South Staffordshire Regiment ==
The unit was originally formed on 22 April 1940 at Blandford Camp, Dorset, as 12th (Pioneer) Battalion, South Staffordshire Regiment. As a pioneer battalion, the 12th does not appear to have been assigned to any field force or home defence formation. However it was converted into a normal infantry battalion on 24 October 1940 and on 11 December it joined 25th Brigade in 47th (London) Infantry Division. At the time this division was training in Wales as part of Western Command. In February 1941 it became part of IV Corps and deployed to West Sussex, defending the South Coast of England against possible invasion.

47th (London) Division's 'Bow Bells' formation sign.

At the end of 1941 the battalion was selected to be retrained in the light anti-aircraft (LAA) role equipped with Bofors 40 mm guns: on 15 November 1941 it transferred to the Royal Artillery (RA) as 91st LAA Regiment, comprising Regimental Headquarters (RHQ) and 314, 315 and 316 LAA Batteries. Surplus men were drafted on 26 November to 211th Heavy Anti-Aircraft Training Regiment at Oswestry where they joined a new 494 (Mixed) Heavy AA Bty that was being formed for 143rd (Mixed) HAA Rgt ('Mixed' indicating that women from the Auxiliary Territorial Service were integrated into the unit's personnel).

== 91st Light Anti-Aircraft Regiment ==
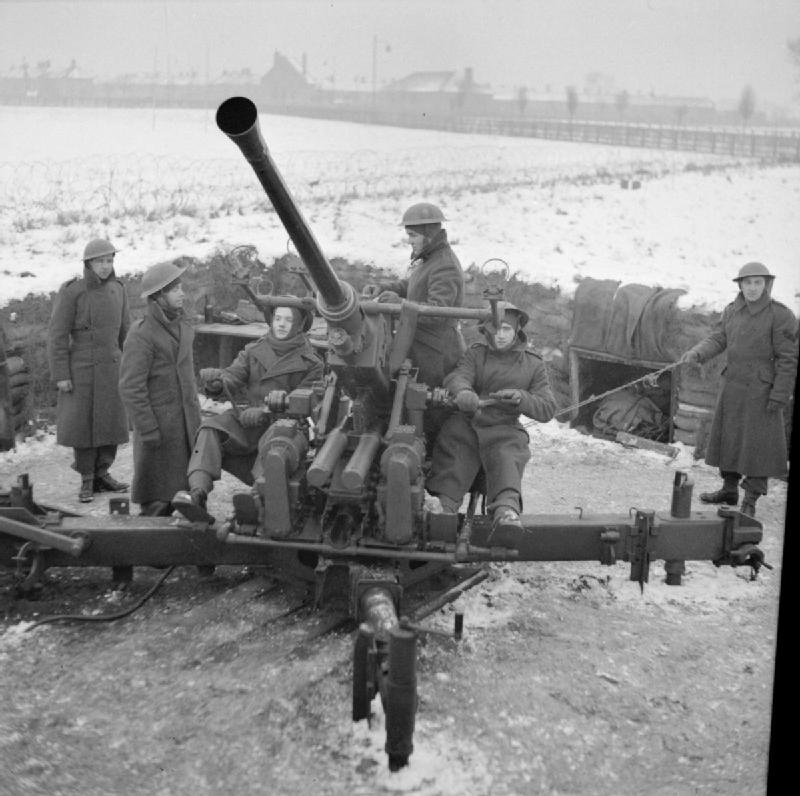
A Bofors 40 mm LAA gun crew under training, January 1942.

4th Division's 'one-fourth' formation sign.

The new regiment was originally part of Anti-Aircraft Command, but left before it was allocated to a brigade, and instead it joined 4th Infantry Division on 26 January 1942; it would stay with this formation for the rest of its service.

4th Division was a field army formation under GHQ Home Forces, training in Southern Scotland in early 1942. In June it was converted into a 'mixed' division, consisting of two infantry brigades and one tank brigade trained to fight together. On 15 July it was assigned to V Corps, one of the formations earmarked for the planned landings in North Africa (Operation Torch). under First Army.

=== Tunisia ===
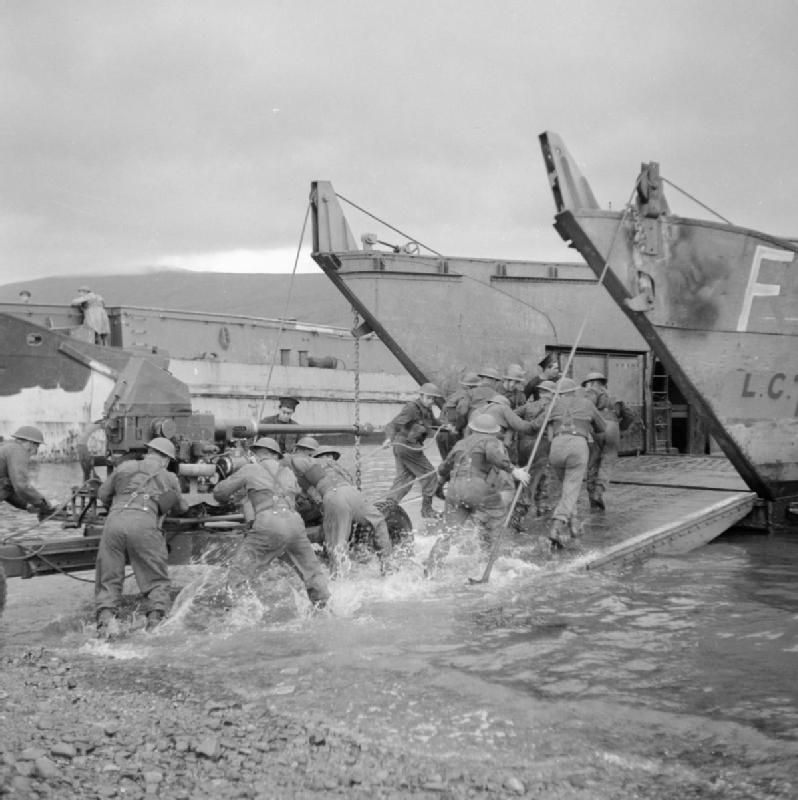
A Bofors gun of 91st LAA Rgt being loaded onto a landing craft in a combined operations training exercise in Scotland on 17 November 1942.

The Torch landings began on 8 November 1942, and First Army's units and formations were progressively fed into the fighting. V Corps' Advanced HQ and some of its divisions arrived on 22 November, but 4th Division was still in the UK: 91st LAA Rgt was photographed undergoing a combined operations training exercise in Scotland on 17 November. 4th Division did not sail from the UK until 12 March 1943, landing on 23 March and reaching the front between 3 and 6 April in time for the final phases of the fighting in the Tunisian Campaign.

Typically, a divisional LAA regiment in this campaign allocated one battery to each of the division's field artillery regiments, the three LAA Troops being spread across the field gun area in whatever pattern suited the ground, the individual gun sites being chosen by the troop commanders and gun Numbers 1. Moving and deploying AA guns in the rough country with underpowered gun tractors was difficult but necessary as units in the forward areas were subjected to regular dive-bombing and ground attacks. Ammunition expenditure by the LAA batteries was high, often wasted by the newly-arrived and inexperienced regiments engaging unsuitable targets at long range, and supply was sometimes erratic. With greater experience of 'snap' actions against fast low-flying aircraft, Bofors gun units increasingly abandoned using the Kerrison Predictor in favour of the simple 'Stiffkey Stick' deflection sight.

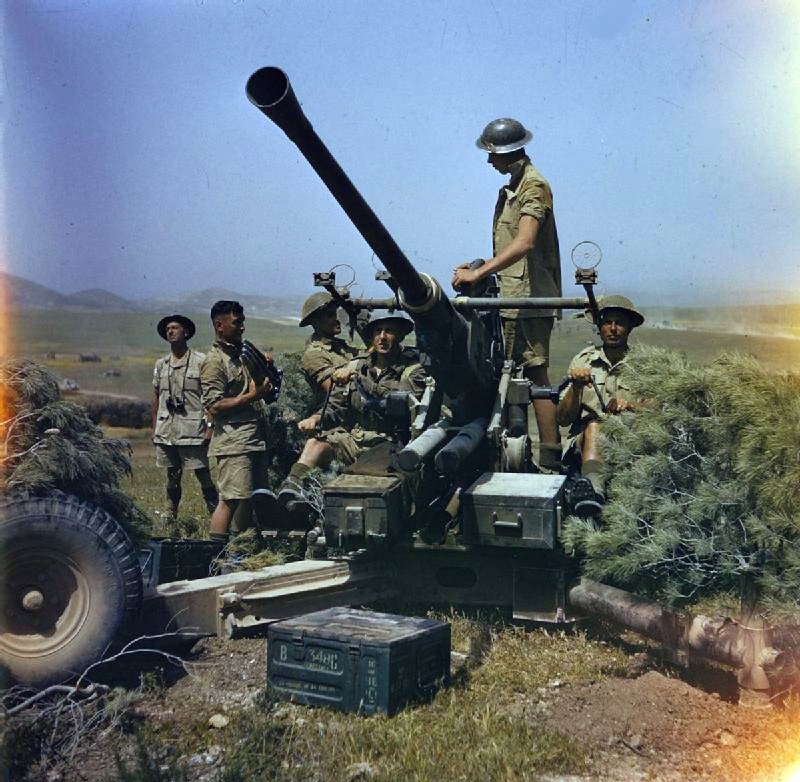
Bofors gun and crew in action near Tunis, May 1943.

V Corps was given the task of securing the ground necessary to open the Oued Zarga– Medjez el Bab road, and then moving on to capture Longstop Hill, which had defied the Allies since December. Two weeks of hard slogging followed for 4th Division, during which Junkers Ju 87s and Messerschmitt Bf 109s were active in low-level Strafing and tank-busting missions. During the Oued Zarga battle (7–15 April) 15 were shot down in V Corps' deployment area.

After V Corps had broken the back of the defence, First Army began its final offensive on Tunis (Operation Vulcan) on 22 April, which involved five days' hard fighting across the Medjez Plain before the armour could break through. 4th Division entered the battle on 24 April. Axis air attacks were maintained until 25 April, doing considerable damage, but tailed off thereafter. By early May the Axis forces were crumbling, and a final thrust (Operation Strike) took the First Army into Tunis on 7 May; the Axis forces surrendered on 13 May.

=== Italy ===
After the Axis defeat in North Africa, 4th Division remained there for the next nine months while the Allies invaded first Sicily and then mainland Italy. At the end of 1943 4th Division was converted back into a standard infantry division, exchanging its armoured brigade for an infantry brigade drawn from the garrison of Gibraltar. It then went on a five-day sea voyage from Tunisia to the British base area in Egypt, arriving on 23 December. It was then shipped to the Italian Front on 15 February 1944 in exchange for an exhausted British division.

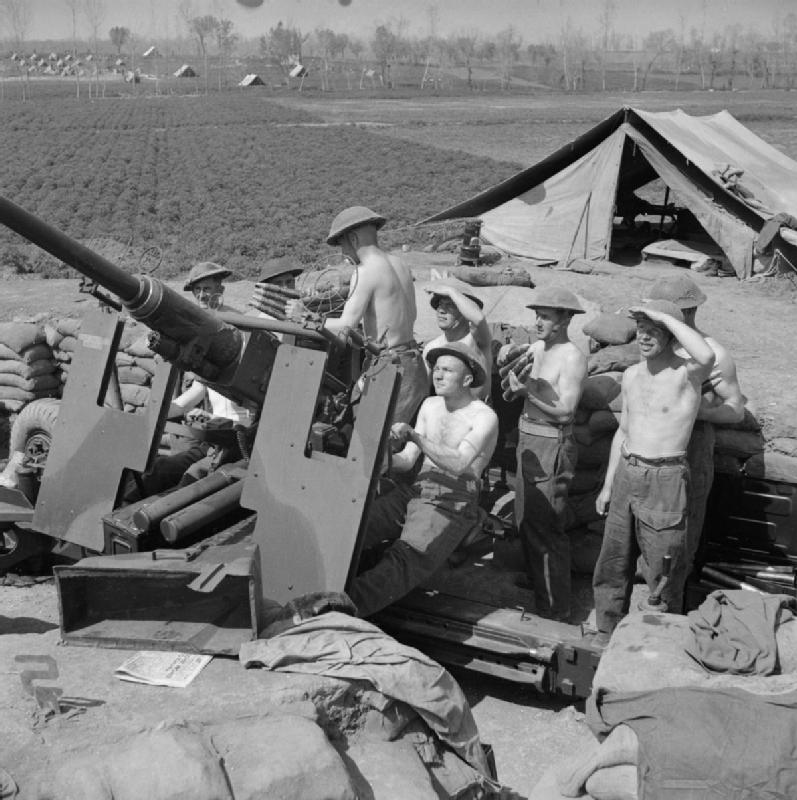
Bofors gun and crew in Italy, April 1944.

The division's first operation was an assault crossing of the River Rapido during the night of 11/12 May to launch Operation Diadem (the fourth and final Battle of Monte Cassino). By early on 13 May the river had been bridged and the division was pushing westwards along the Liri Valley, turning the flank of the German defenders on Monte Cassino.

After its exertions, 4th Division went into Army Reserve, returning to the front between 1 and 6 June. Eighth Army was pursuing the German forces towards Lake Trasimeno after the fall of Rome, and on 21 and 22 June 4th Division deployed to attack the Trasimene Line. After hard fighting the defences were breached on 28 June. By 4 July the division was heading for Arezzo, though it was held up for a while by counter-attacks, then on to Florence. To clear the River Arno loop east of Florence, the division had to lay on a fullscale assault on the hilltop Incontro Monastery.

The gravely weakened Luftwaffe was unable to influence any of these operations. Meanwhile British forces in Italy were suffering an acute manpower shortage. In June 1944 the Chiefs of Staff decided that the number of AA regiments in Italy must be reduced – corps LAA regiments were disbanded and divisional LAA regiments such as 91st LAA Rgt were reduced from 54 to 36 guns – their surplus personnel being converted to other roles, particularly infantry. At the same time the AA guns were finding other uses. LAA troops were included in fireplans for defended localities and Bofors guns were often employed to harass known enemy machine gun and mortar positions out to a range of 1,000 yards (910 m) or more. A concentrated burst of fire at 120 rounds per minute when a machine gun opened fire was usually effective at suppression. Some infantry commanders were keen for Bofors to 'brown' any area from which an attack was anticipated.

The next Allied offensive was Operation Olive to breach the Gothic Line defences. 4th Division was in reserve in the Foligno area, but its artillery was sent forward to support I Canadian Corps. The rest of the division was called up for the assault on the Rimini Line beginning on 12 September after a heavy artillery programme. On the night of 17/18 September 4th Division crossed the River Ausa, supported 'by neutralising fire from all weapons' and it cleared San Aquilina on the opposite ridge by the afternoon of 19 September. It returned to the line in early October, crossing the River Savio on 20 October, but failed to 'bounce' a crossing at the River Ronco on 25/26 October. The increasingly bad weather effectively ended the campaign for the time being.

=== Disbandment ===
By late 1944, the Luftwaffe was suffering from such shortages of pilots, aircraft and fuel that serious air attacks could be discounted. As a result further cuts could be made in AA units to address the British reinforcement crisis. 91st Light Anti-Aircraft Regiment left 4th Division on 6 November, and while the rest of the division sailed for service against the uprising in Greece (the Dekemvriana) on 12 December, 91st LAA Rgt was disbanded on 18 December 1944.
