= 143rd (Mixed) Heavy Anti-Aircraft Regiment, Royal Artillery =

143rd (Mixed) HAA Regiment, RA 75 HAA Regiment, RA
- Royal Artillery cap badge
- Active: 19 January 1942 – 16 June 1955
- Country: United Kingdom
- Branch: British Army
- Role: Air defence
- Size: Regiment (3–5 batteries)
- Part of: Anti-Aircraft Command
- Garrison/HQ: Gloucester; Milton Barracks
- Engagements: World War II

143rd Heavy Anti-Aircraft Regiment was an air defence unit of Britain's Royal Artillery formed during World War II. It started out as a 'Mixed' regiment with around two-thirds of its personnel being women from the Auxiliary Territorial Service (ATS). The regiment defended the West of England from 1942 to the end of the war when it moved to South East England. The regiment continued (as an all-male unit) in the postwar British Army.

== Organisation ==
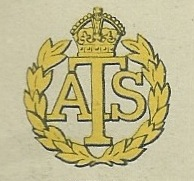
Cap Badge of the Auxiliary Territorial Service

By 1941, after two years of war Anti-Aircraft Command, tasked with defending the UK against air attack, was suffering a manpower shortage. In April its commander-in-chief, Lieutenant-General Sir Frederick 'Tim' Pile, proposed to overcome this by utilising the women of the Auxiliary Territorial Service (ATS). The ATS was by law a non-combatant service, but it was decided that Defence Regulations permitted the employment of women in anti-aircraft (AA) roles other than actually firing the guns. They worked the radar and plotting instruments, range-finders and predictors, ran command posts and communications, and carried out many other duties. With the increasing automation of heavy AA (HAA) guns, including gun-laying, fuze-setting and ammunition loading under remote control from the predictor, the question of who actually fired the gun became blurred as the war progressed. The ATS rank and file, if not always their officers, took to the new role with enthusiasm and 'Mixed' batteries and regiments with the ATS supplying two-thirds of their personnel quickly proved a success.

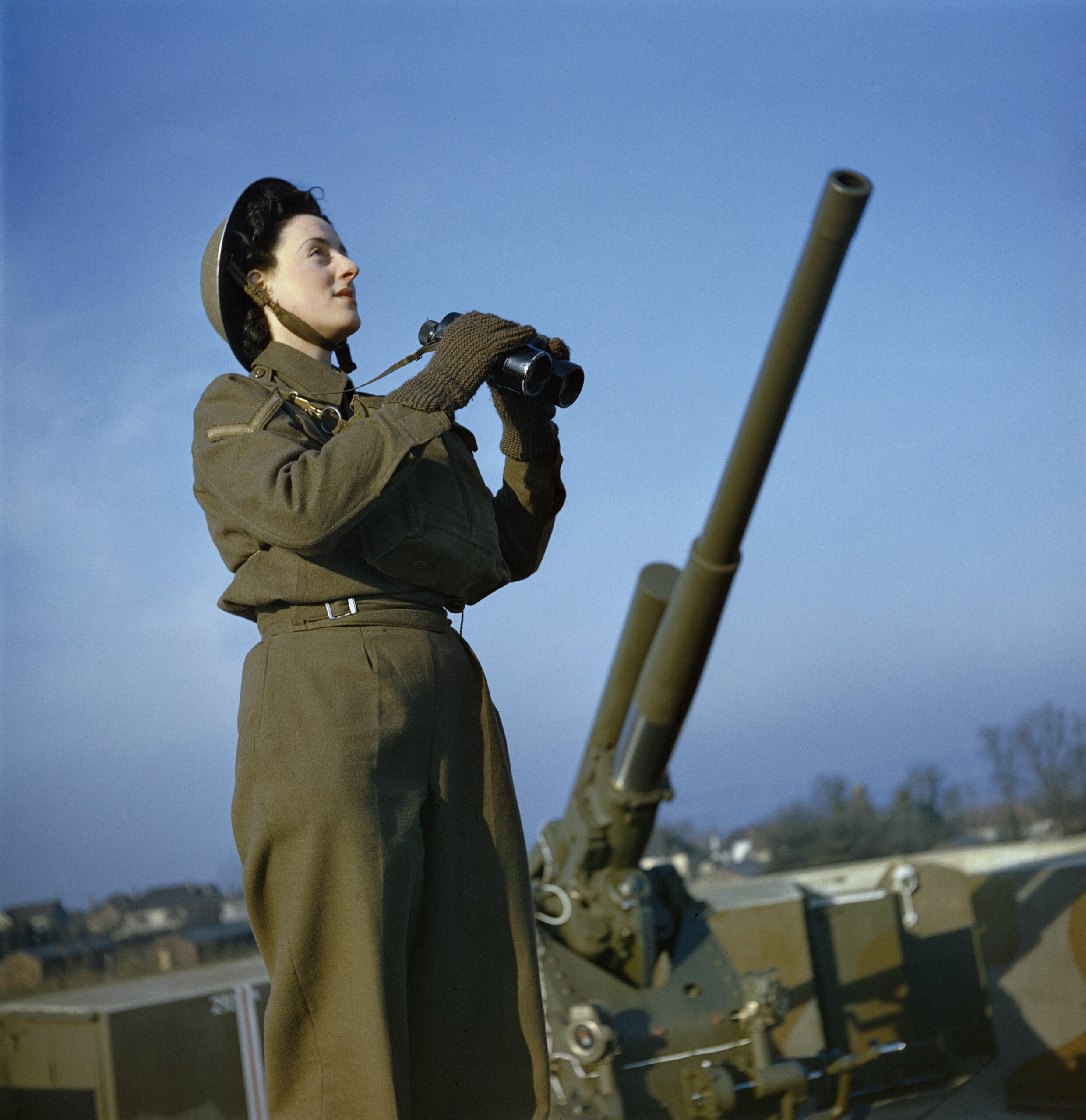
An ATS member of a mixed 3.7-inch HAA gun battery, December 1942.

By late 1941 the training regiments were turning out a regular stream of Mixed HAA batteries, which AA Command formed into regiments to take the place of the all-male units being sent to overseas theatres of war. One such new unit was 143rd (Mixed) HAA Regiment. Regimental Headquarters (RHQ) was formed on 19 January 1942 at Quedgeley Court, near Gloucester, and on 2 February three batteries were regimented with it. These had each been formed with a cadre of experienced officers and other ranks provided by an existing unit: in the case of 496 HAA Battery this comprised a battery commander-designate, 2 other officers and 9 other ranks who were pre-war members of 79th (Hertfordshire Yeomanry) HAA Regiment in the Territorial Army (TA). The male soldier intake of these batteries were men transferred from recently formed Light AA (LAA) units, the majority of the personnel were women from the ATS. The regiment was composed as follows:

- 494 (Mixed) HAA Bty, formed on 26 November 1941 at 211th HAA Training Rgt, Oswestry, cadre from 90th HAA Rgt, soldier intake from 89th LAA Rgt (11th Battalion, Buffs (Royal East Kent Regiment)), 91st LAA Rgt (12th Bn South Staffordshire Regiment), 92nd (Loyals) LAA Rgt (7th Battalion, Loyal Regiment (North Lancashire)) and 94th LAA Rgt (8th Battalion, King's Own Yorkshire Light Infantry)
- 495 (Mixed) HAA Bty, formed on 3 December 1941 at 205th HAA Training Rgt, Arborfield, cadre from 116th HAA Rgt, soldier intake from LAA Troops
- 496 (Mixed) HAA Bty, formed on 3 December 1941 at 206th HAA Training Rgt, Arborfield, cadre from 79th (Hertfordshire Yeomanry) HAA Rgt, soldier intake from 224 LAA Trp, 85 LAA Bty, 47th LAA Rgt

== Deployment ==
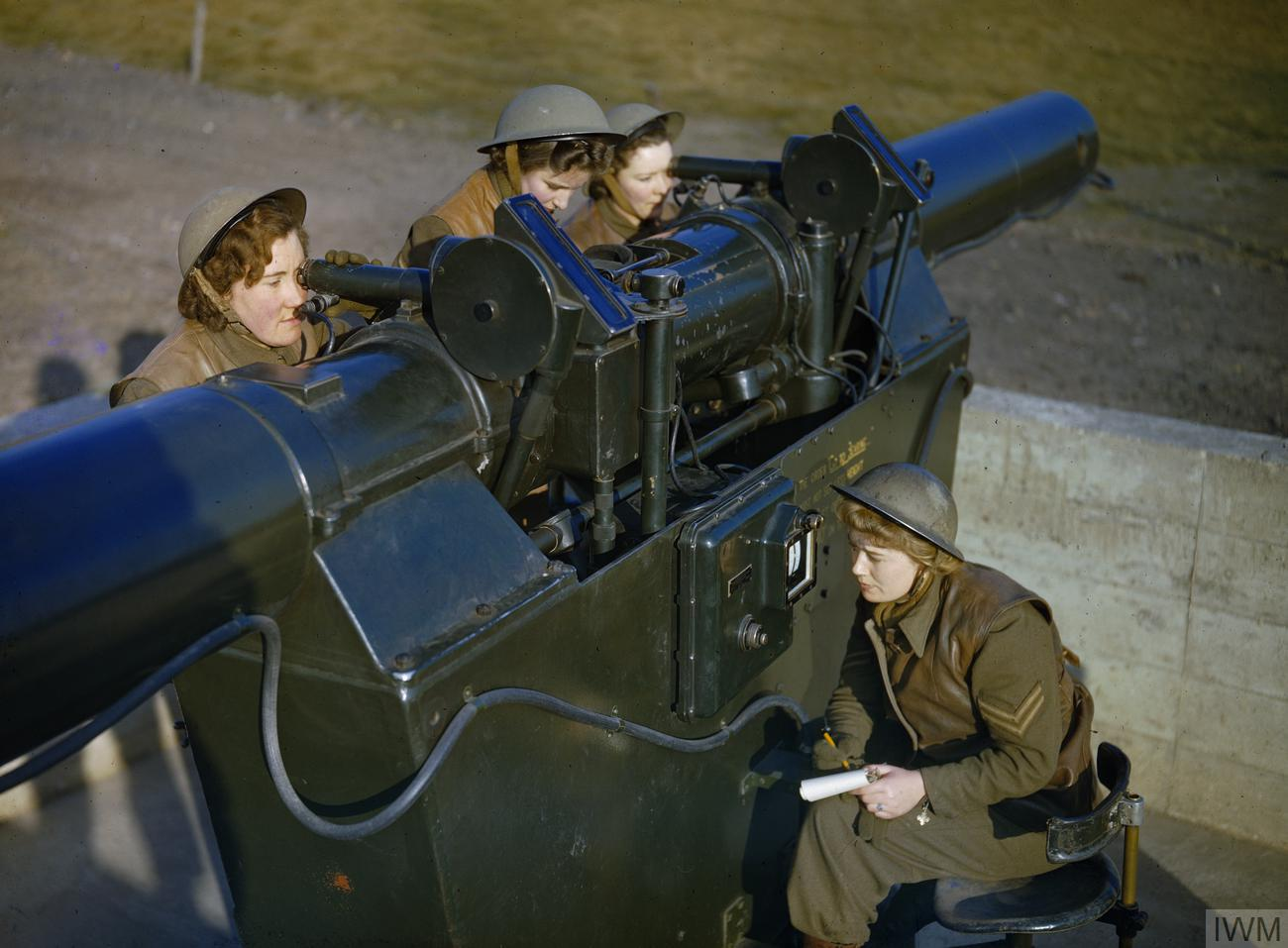
ATS women operating a height and range finder on an HAA gun site, December 1942.

By the beginning of March 1942 143rd (M) HAA Rgt had been assigned to 5th AA Brigade in 9th AA Division, responsible for defending the area around Gloucester and Hereford. By now the regiment had been joined by 489 (M) HAA Bty, transferred from 141st (M) HAA Rgt. However, this battery was attached to the neighbouring 8th AA Division and was transferred again to 150th (M) HAA Rgt almost immediately. Similarly, 496 (M) HAA Battery was temporarily attached to 45 AA Bde covering Cardiff and Newport within 9th AA Division.

Although there were a number of Luftwaffe air raids on cities in the West of England during the so-called Baedeker Blitz of 1942, none directly affected the Gloucester area. In June there was a reorganisation of AA divisional and brigade boundaries in the West of England, and 143rd (M) HAA Rgt transferred to the command of 67 AA Bde. 474 HAA Battery joined the regiment on 29 June 1942 having left the all-male 138th HAA Rgt as a cadre and been converted into a mixed battery. 474 and 496 (M) HAA Btys then transferred to 171st (Mixed) HAA Rgt on 29 August 1942.

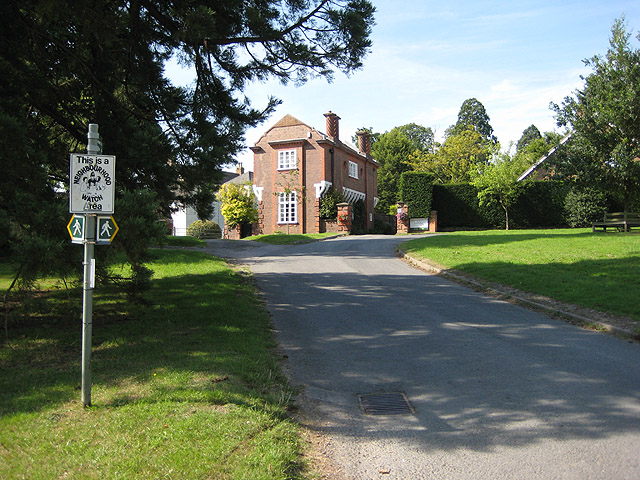
Badgeworth Court: Regimental HQ.

During the autumn of 1942, 143rd (M) HAA Rgt and its two remaining batteries (494 and 495) were the only units in 67 AA Bde. The South Coast was under attack from 'hit-and-run' raids by fighter-bombers and brigade HQ was transferred on 8 November command LAA reinforcements being sent to the area. 143rd (M) HAA Regiment and the Gloucester–Cheltenham Gun Defence Area (GDA) then came under the command of 46 AA Bde at Bristol. The commanding officer (CO) of 143rd undertook the duties of AA Defence Commander (AADC) for the GDA from his RHQ at Badgeworth Court between Gloucester and Cheltenham, with a Gun Operations Room (GOR) at Gloucester. The regiment was joined by 589 (M) HAA Bty, formed at 205th HAA Training Rgt, Arborfield, on 19 August and regimented on 9 November; this battery took over gunsites at Swindon. Two more batteries formed on 21 October 620 (M) at 206th HAA Training Rgt, Arborfield, and 621 (M) at 211th HAA Training Rgt, Oswestry, joined in January, but 621 was immediately transferred on to a new 181st (M) HAA Rgt forming at Cardiff.

Apart from a raid on 17 February 1943, when about 20 enemy aircraft made a surprise attack having followed RAF bombers returning to base, there was virtually no enemy activity over 46 AA Bde's area for the whole year. The rest of the time the gunners spent waiting or training, including training detachments of the Home Guard as relief HAA gun crews. In early 1944, however, the Luftwaffe began a new campaign, the so-called 'Baby Blitz', that brought several raids over the West Country from February onwards.

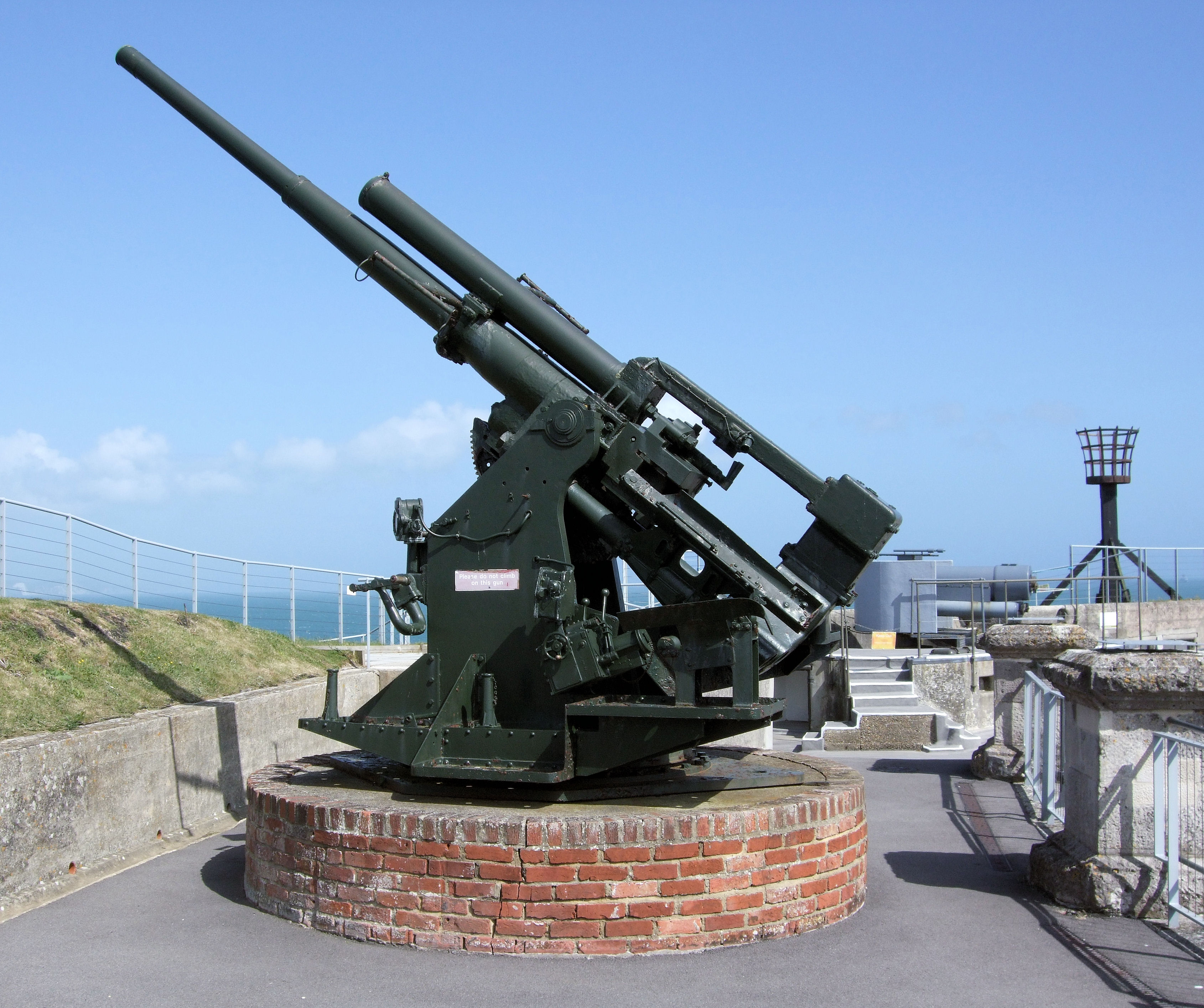
3.7-inch HAA gun preserved at Nothe Fort, Weymouth.

In March 1944, 143rd (M) HAA Rgt moved to 55 AA Bde covering the Plymouth–Falmouth area where shipping was being gathered for the Allied invasion of Normandy (Operation Overlord). As the Baby Blitz continued, Plymouth was attacked on 29 April, Torquay on 28 May and Falmouth on 29 May.

After the invasion was launched on D Day (6 June) the regiment remained in the West Country while many other units were stripped out to reinforce the South East against V-1 flying bombs or to provide manpower for 21st Army Group fighting in North West Europe. On 4 December 1944, 589 and 620 (M) HAA Btys began to disband, completing on 7 and 18 March respectively at Torpoint, Cornwall. This left 55 AA Bde with just two HAA batteries (494 and 495 of 143rd (M) HAA Rgt) before the brigade HQ itself was converted in January 1945 into 306 Infantry Brigade to command garrison troops in 21st Army Group. The regiment came under the direct command of 8 AA Group, headquartered in Scotland, and then transferred to 37 AA Bde in 1 AA Group in South East England.

== Postwar ==
After VE Day the demobilisation of the ATS got under way, and on 25 August 1945 the regiment reorganised as an all-male unit. It was joined by 228 (Edinburgh) HAA Bty from 82nd (Essex) HAA Rgt (also in 37 AA Bde), which brought it back to a normal three-battery establishment in the postwar army.

From 1 January 1947, the regiment was considered a new war-formed unit of the Regular Army. On 1 April that year it was redesignated as 75 HAA Regiment (Note: There was no connection between this regiment and the wartime 75th (Home Counties) (Cinque Ports) HAA Rgt, which had reformed in the postwar TA as 259 (Home Counties) (Cinque Ports) HAA Rgt.) at Milton Barracks, Gravesend, equipped with 3.7-inch and 5.25-inch HAA guns. The batteries were also reorganised:

- 228 HAA Bty (previously 228 (Edinburgh) Bty in the TA) was formally disbanded at Laindon, Essex, to resuscitate 13 Coast Battery of the Regular RA as 37 HAA Bty in the new regiment
- 494 HAA Bty was redesignated 288 HAA Bty
- 495 HAA Bty was redesignated 289 HAA Bty

37 AA Brigade's Regular units reformed 11 AA Bde in 1 AA Gp of AA Command.

75 HAA Regiment was reduced to a cadre on 30 July 1948. On 15 August 1953, 288 and 289 Btys were formally placed in suspended animation (and disbanded on 1 May 1954) to resuscitate in the UK 150 Bty from 28 Coast Rgt (in Gibraltar) and 182 Bty from 51 Coast Rgt (in Aden) respectively. On 16 June 1955, RHQ of 75 HAA Rgt and 37, 150 and 182 Btys were placed in suspended animation to resuscitate 46 HAA Rgt at Milton Barracks with 117, 124 and 126 Btys, but after service in Cyprus in 1957–58 this regiment in turn went into suspended animation on 31 October 1958.

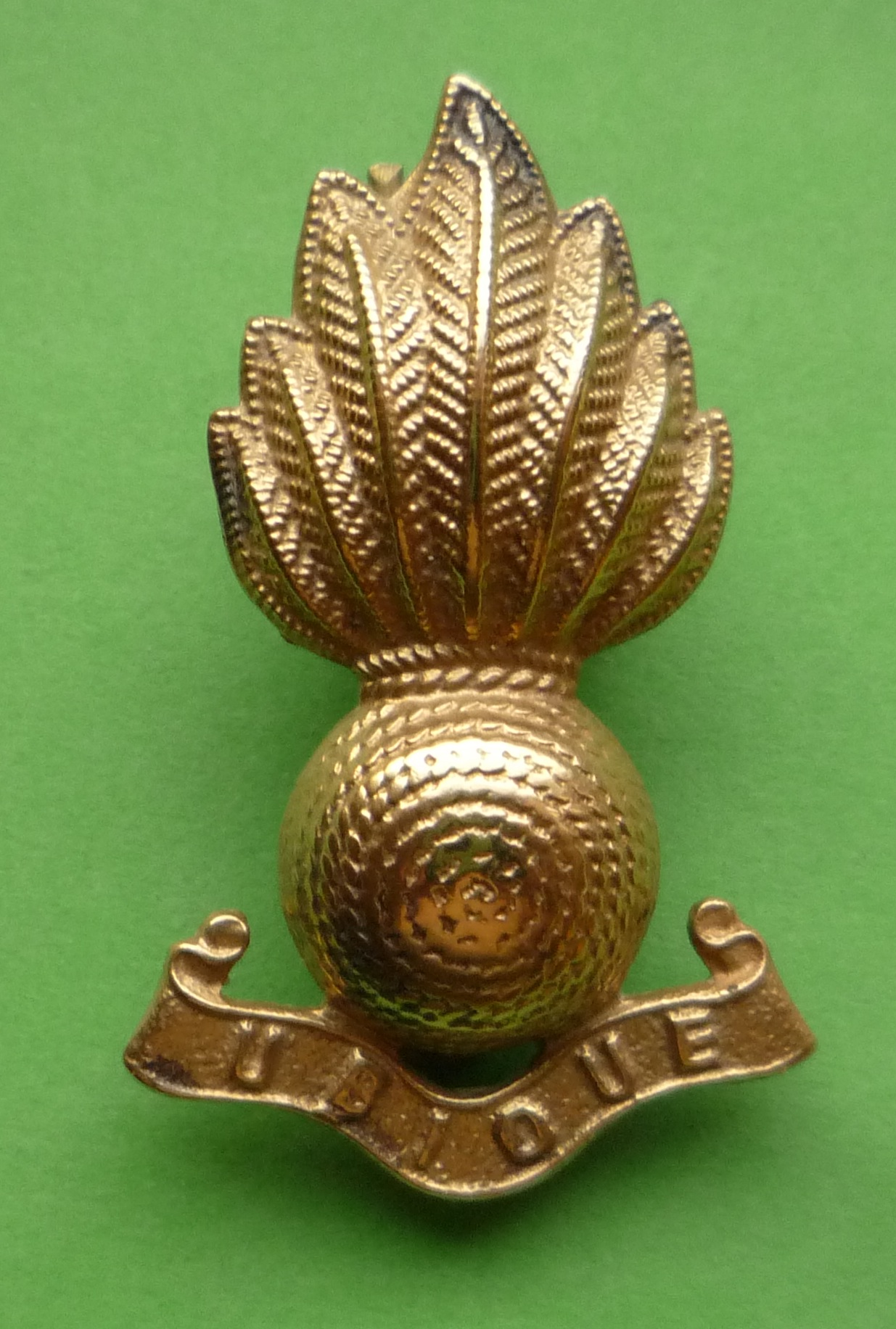
Brass collar badge of the Royal Artillery

== Insignia ==
While the male members of the regiment wore the Royal Artillery's 'gun' cap badge, the women wore the ATS cap badge, but in addition they wore the RA's 'grenade' collar badge as a special badge above the left breast pocket of the tunic. Both sexes wore the white RA lanyard on the right shoulder.

== External sources ==
- British Army units from 1945 on
