= 94th Light Anti-Aircraft Regiment, Royal Artillery =

8th Battalion, King's Own Yorkshire Light Infantry 94th Light Anti-Aircraft Regiment, RA
- Cap badge of the Royal Artillery
- Active: 28 May 1940–16 January 1946
- Country: United Kingdom
- Branch: British Army
- Role: Infantry; Air defence
- Size: Battalion; Regiment
- Part of: Guards Armoured Division
- Engagements: Operation Goodwood; Operation Bluecoat; Liberation of Brussels; Operation Market Garden; Operation Veritable; Advance across Germany

The 94th Light Anti-Aircraft Regiment, Royal Artillery, (94th LAA Rgt) was an air defence unit of the British Army during World War II. Initially raised as an infantry battalion of the King's Own Yorkshire Light Infantry in 1940, it transferred to the Royal Artillery in 1941. It served with Guards Armoured Division in Normandy (Operation Overlord) and through the campaign in North West Europe until VE Day.

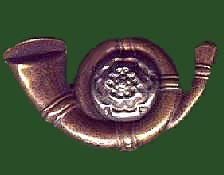
The KOYLI's cap badge.

== 8th Battalion, King's Own Yorkshire Light Infantry ==
The unit was originally formed at Kingston upon Hull on 28 May 1940 as 50th Holding Battalion, King's Own Yorkshire Light Infantry (KOYLI), as part of the rapid expansion of the Army with wartime conscripts. It converted to a normal infantry battalion on 9 October that year as 8th Battalion, KOYLI.

On 22 October it joined 218th Independent Infantry Brigade (Home) which was being organised as a static defence formation in Yorkshire Area. The brigade became part of Yorkshire County Division when that formation became operational in I Corps on 19 March 1941.

== 94th Light Anti-Aircraft Regiment ==
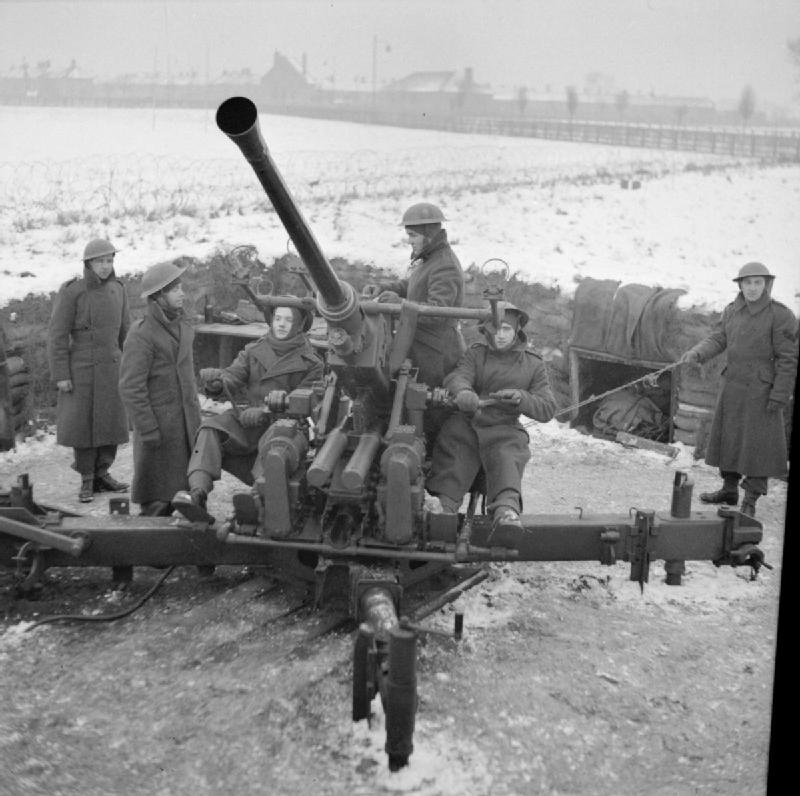
A Bofors 40 mm LAA gun crew under training, January 1942.

8th KOYLI left 218th Bde on 6 November 1941 and transferred to the Royal Artillery (RA) to begin retraining in the light anti-aircraft (LAA) role: on 15 November it became 94th LAA Regiment, consisting of Regimental Headwquarters (RHQ) and 323–325 LAA Batteries, equipped with Bofors 40 mm guns. Surplus men were drafted on 26 November to 211th Heavy AA Training Regiment at Oswestry where they joined a new 494 (Mixed) Heavy AA Bty that was being formed for 143rd (Mixed) HAA Rgt ('Mixed' indicating that women from the Auxiliary Territorial Service were integrated into the unit's personnel).

After initial training the regiment joined Anti-Aircraft Command, but left before it had been allocated to a brigade. It was assigned to Guards Armoured Division on 27 January 1942, initially to the Guards Support Group, which became HQ Royal Artillery of the division on 1 June. The divisional history comments that the regiment 'had the difficult task of training for a completely new and unfamiliar role'.

=== Overlord training ===
Guards Armoured Division's formation sign.

At the time, Guards Armoured Division was stationed in Southern Command, but its component units, particularly specialist units such as the LAA regiment, could be sent all over the country to training areas, practice camps and firing ranges. When not training, the field force LAA regiments were sent on short attachments with AA Command for Air Defence of Great Britain (ADGB) duty on the South Coast of England, where all available LAA guns were needed to defend against 'hit and run' attacks by Luftwaffe fighter-bombers. For example, early in 1943 94th LAA Rgt manned operational gunsites in the Southampton area, until it was relieved on 9 February by another divisional LAA unit, 89th LAA Rgt of 49th (West Riding) Infantry Division.

In mid-February the whole division participated in a 12-day training exercise (Exercise Eagle) in the Yorkshire Wolds along with the other divisions assigned to VIII Corps.

On 14 March 1944 the regiment's three batteries were augmented to a strength of four troops each when 262 LAA Bty (formerly of 62nd LAA Rgt) joined and was broken up to form 54–56 Trps. This brought the establishment of Bofors guns up to 72, but before D-Day some LAA regiments. began exchanging Bofors for multiple-barrelled 20 mm guns (usually Oerlikons or Polstens).

=== Normandy ===
Guards Armoured Division landed in Normandy between 25 and 30 June. Its first action was Operation Goodwood on 18 July, in which VIII Corps' three armoured divisions would secretly cross to the east side of the River Orne and then thrust southwards past Caen deep into German-held territory. The Guards were the second division in the column, but the advance ran out of impetus once the tanks had passed out of range of the supporting artillery, which was still west of the river because of congestion in the bridgehead. That night the Luftwaffe made one of its rare air raids, hitting the Orne bridgehead and causing damage among the rear echelons of the armoured divisions. The few German air sorties made next day while the British consolidated were ineffective. It was during that afternoon (19 July) that the regiment scored its first 'kill' when a formation attempted to attack 32nd Guards Brigade HQ: 324 LAA Bty 'sent one crashing down in flames and the rest made off hurriedly, two of them smoking and losing height. During the next two days two more aircraft definitely fell to the regiment and three more were damaged'.

Since the Allies had achieved air superiority over the beachhead, there was little call for AA defence, and AA units became increasingly used to supplement the divisional artillery to support ground operations. LAA units fired tracer to guide night attacks onto their objectives, and the Bofors guns were much in demand for infantry support. They could give useful close-range fire to help infantry working from cover to cover in the bocage; the rapid fire was good for suppressing enemy heavy weapons, the 40 mm round's sensitive percussion fuze providing an airburst effect among trees. It was also used for 'bunker-busting', though the lack of protection made the gun detachment vulnerable to return fire. LAA units also provided 'refuge strips' for air observation post aircraft spotting for the field guns: a Bofors troop deployed with Local Warning radar and ground observers could alert the pilot to the presence of enemy aircraft and provide protection for him.

The German front began to break up at the end of July. Guards Armoured was deployed to support II Canadian Corps's Operation Spring on 25 July but did not get into action. It was then shifted west as British Second Army began its move south (Operation Bluecoat) on 30 July. On the afternoon of 31 July Guards Armoured was ordered out of its assembly points north of Caumont to advance on 11th Armoured Division's flank. By evening it was in contact with the enemy south-east of St Martin and next day, despite traffic jams, it secured its objectives after some hard fighting. Its reconnaissance elements pushed further forward through 'mortar gulch' on 2 August. The advance lost impetus, with hard fighting round Arclais and Estry, but by 11 August the division was pushing its way south from Vire.

After Bluecoat, the Canadians' Operation Totalize completed the breakout and much of the German army was trapped in the Falaise Pocket. 21st Army Group then began a rapid advance across northern France, with Guards Armoured driving over 90 miles (140 km) in under 24 hours to seize a bridge over the River Somme at Corbie on 31 August. It carried on into Belgium, liberating Brussels by the end of 3 September. Opposition hardened at the Albert Canal, but the Guards seized a bridgehead over it.

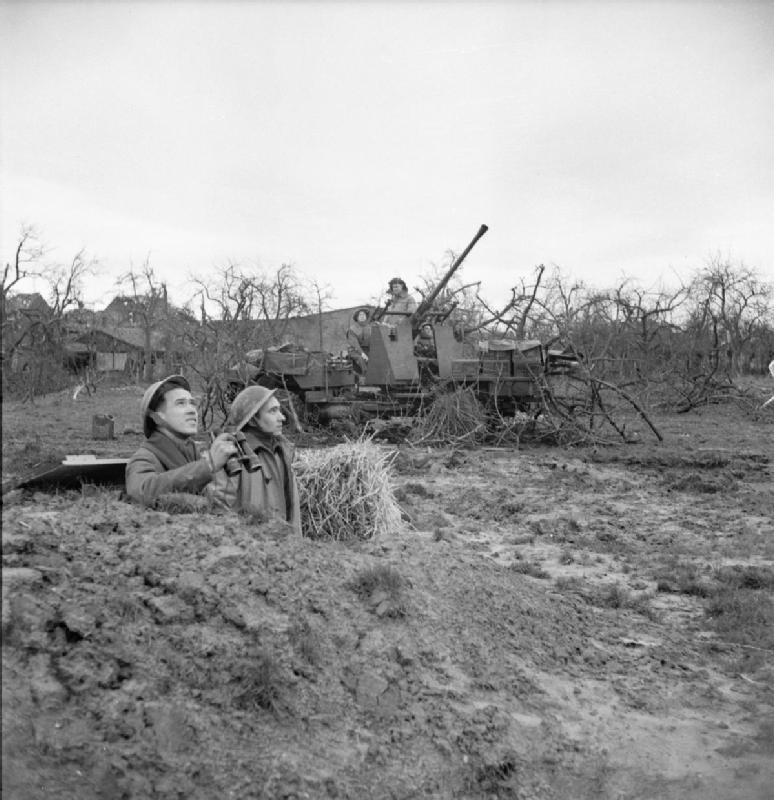
Bofors gun and crew, North West Europe, November 1944.

=== Market Garden ===
Guards Armoured Division was chosen to spearhead XXX Corps in the ground part of Operation Market Garden (beginning on 17 September) to link up a series of bridgeheads captured by airborne troops as far as Arnhem on the Nederrijn. British AA units only played a small role in the ensuing battle, except insofar as a large number of captured bridges and bridging sites along the route had to be given AA protection, as did the strung-out road columns, which also came under ground attack. On the afternoon of 19 September there was a short sharp battle with 15 aircraft near Malden, when A Trp shot down two in full view of the guardsmen on the road. Early the following morning B and D Trps fought six Focke-Wulf Fw 190s that attacked the 32nd Guards Bde column while it was halted on the Grave bridge. The Bofors were in the road column, which was blocked by three lines of traffic, but 'they provided an exemplary display of snap-action', shooting down one aircraft immediately, while another crashed further off.

100th AA Brigade took over most of these commitments once its units forced their way forward through the traffic and roadblocks. This was particularly the case at the Nijmegen bridges, which were the lifeline to Guards Armoured Division and other formations that had been brought to a halt on 'The Island' short of the Nederrijn. The bridge area came under heavy air attack in the following days.

When the Germans began their Ardennes Offensive (the Battle of the Bulge) in December, Guards Armoured Division was moved to block their possible advance over the River Meuse The Luftwaffe was more active than for many weeks, mainly attacking bridges and US Army positions. On 1 January 1945 it launched Operation Bodenplatte, with hundreds of single-engined fighter-bombers attacking at low level. The main targets were Allied airfields, but there were engagements by Allied fighters and LAA units all over 21st Army Group's area, with dozens of aircraft shot down. The only serious attack in Guards Armoured's area was on a US airfield at St Trond. 94th LAA Regiment's Q Troop, attached to 153rd (Leicestershire Yeomanry) Field Rgt, broke up this attack, destroying one aircraft that came down in the gun area and hitting two others. This brought the regiment's score to 40 destroyed and 12 confirmed damaged in the campaign so far, a creditable record given the generally low level of enemy air activity. GHQ AA Troops for 21st Army Group reported that '40 mm LAA had the time of its life'.

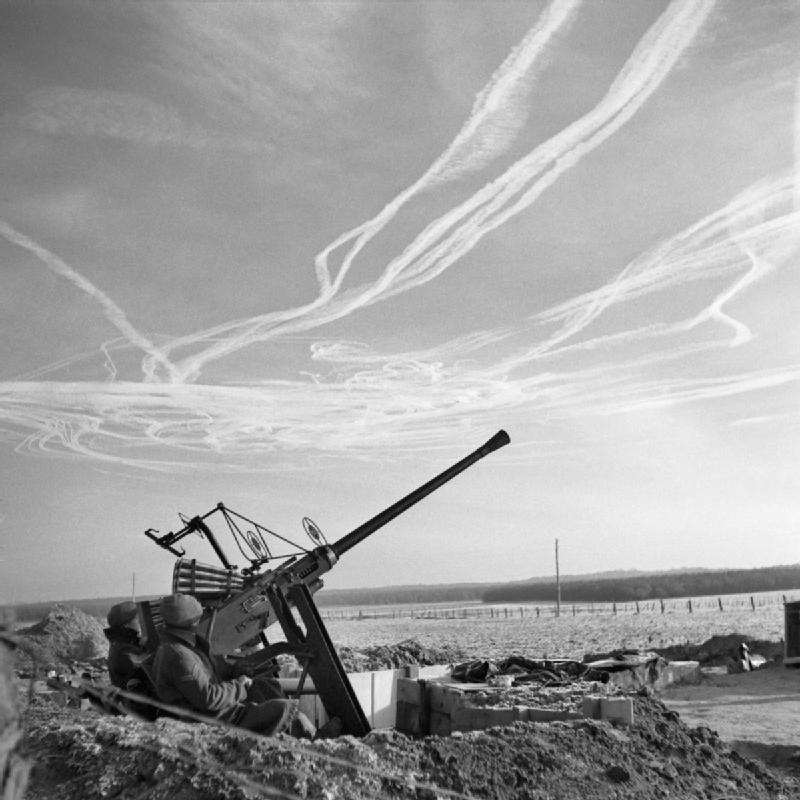
A Bofors crew watch vapour trails above the Dutch–German border, December 1944.

=== Germany ===
During the winter Guards Armoured's artillery trained on the newly opened ranges at Lommel. 94th LAA regiment concentrated on ground shooting with their Bofors guns, which was becoming more important.

Guards Armoured Division was part of XXX Corps' reserve for the offensive into the Reichswald (Operation Veritable) beginning on 7 February 1945. Conditions in the forest were so bad that only the division's infantry went in, on 14 February. On 22 February the rest of the division was still waiting to be called forward. Finally on 5 March it passed through and captured Bonninghardt and its commanding ground, then next day it broke through the German lateral line after stiff fighting. By the end of Veritable the Allies had closed up to the Rhine.

By this stage of the war divisional LAA regiments had started to receive quadruple 0.5-inch Browning machine guns on SP mountings (the M51 Quadmount) in place of a proportion of their Bofors guns, to improve their capability against 'snap' attacks by the new German jet fighter-bombers. Under this arrangement a troop comprised four SP or towed Bofors and two quadruple SP Brownings.

Although Guards Armoured was not scheduled to take part in the assault crossing of the Rhine (Operation Plunder) – it would have to wait for bridges to be built before it could get its armour across – 94th LAA Rgt played a full part with the other follow-up divisions' LAA units in the 'Pepperpot'. This was a bombardment by massed LAA and A/T guns, machine guns and mortars of all calibres to saturate the enemy positions in front of the assaulting infantry, while the field and medium artillery concentrated on specific targets. Four troops of 94th LAA Rgt took part, moving up close to the river the night before under cover of darkness. The LAA units also fired lines of tracer to guide the Buffaloes across the wide river in the dark.

Once the bridgeheads were established, Guards Armoured Division passed through 15th (Scottish) Infantry Division on 30 March and began driving across Germany with XXX Corps heading for Bremen. After dealing with rearguards one brigade had to fight hard for Bad Bentheim while the other brigade made a quick night dash for Lingen. The bridge over the River Ems had been blown, but another was found. By 6 April the division was driving onwards again towards Cloppenburg. During these advances the Luftwaffe attacked bridging sites, artillery positions and road movements. For the divisional LAA guns most of these involved 'snap' actions, against low-flying attackers using cloud cover, and often using jet aircraft. Guards Armoured Division was transferred to XII Corps to fight its way through Visselhövede to cut Bremen off, and then drove on to capture Zeven. The numbers of Luftwaffe attacks on the advancing divisions peaked in the last week of the war before the German surrender at Lüneburg Heath came on 4 May. Guards Armoured's gunners celebrated the surrender by choosing a deserted area and firing into it a Feu de joie codenamed 'Fire Plan Grand Finale'. This consisted of shells from every gun of every calibre within range, followed by smoke shells of every available colour.

The units of 21st Army Group were then engaged in occupation duties. This required infantry rather than firepower, so on 12 June Guards Armoured Division gave up its tanks and other armoured vehicles and became simply 'Guards Division', in which 94th Light Anti-Aircraft Regiment continued to serve without its Bofors guns. It was still serving in British Army of the Rhine when it was disbanded on 16 January 1946.

== Commanding Officers ==
Commanding officers of the regiment included the following:

- Lt-Col A.L. Matthews, MC – July 1942
- Lt-Col E.I.E. Strong – D-Day and Arnhem
- Lt-Col J.M. Northern, CBE – VE Day

== Memorial ==
A memorial plaque to the dead of 324 LAA Bty, carrying 18 names, was erected at Stolberg after the war. It is now in the KOYLI Regimental Museum at Doncaster Museum and Art Gallery.

== Notes ==
- John Buckley, Monty's Men: The British Army and the Liberation of Europe, London: Yale University Press, 2013, ISBN 978-0-300-13449-0.
- Basil Collier, History of the Second World War, United Kingdom Military Series: The Defence of the United Kingdom, London: HM Stationery Office, 1957/Uckfield: Naval & Military, 2004, ISBN 978-1-84574-055-9.
- Ian Daglish, Battleground Europe: Normandy: Operation Bluecoat: The British Armoured Breakout, Barnsley: Leo Cooper, 2003, ISBN 0-85052-912-3.
- Maj L.F. Ellis, History of the Second World War, United Kingdom Military Series: Victory in the West, Vol I: The Battle of Normandy, London: HM Stationery Office, 1962/Uckfield: Naval & Military, 2004, ISBN 1-845740-58-0.
- Maj L.F. Ellis, History of the Second World War, United Kingdom Military Series: Victory in the West, Vol II: The Defeat of Germany, London: HM Stationery Office, 1968/Uckfield: Naval & Military, 2004, ISBN 1-845740-59-9.
- Maj-Gen H. Essame, The 43rd Wessex Division at War 1944–45, London: William Clowes, 1952.
- Gen Sir Martin Farndale, History of the Royal Regiment of Artillery: The Years of Defeat: Europe and North Africa, 1939–1941, Woolwich: Royal Artillery Institution, 1988/London: Brasseys, 1996, ISBN 1-85753-080-2.
- J.B.M. Frederick, Lineage Book of British Land Forces 1660–1978, Vol I, Wakefield: Microform Academic, 1984, ISBN 1-85117-007-3.
- J.B.M. Frederick, Lineage Book of British Land Forces 1660–1978, Vol II, Wakefield: Microform Academic, 1984, ISBN 1-85117-009-X.
- Eric Hunt, Battleground Europe: Normandy: Mont Pinçon, Barnsley: Leo Cooper, 2003, ISBN 0-85052-944-1.
- Joslen, H. F. (2003) [1960]. Orders of Battle: Second World War, 1939–1945. Uckfield, East Sussex: Naval and Military Press. ISBN 978-1-84342-474-1.
- John Keegan, Six Armies in Normandy, From D-Day to the Liberation of Paris, London: Jonathan Cape 1982/Penguin 1983, ISBN 0-1400-5293-3.
- Lt-Gen H.G. Martin, The History of the Fifteenth Scottish Division 1939–1945, Edinburgh: Blackwood, 1948/Uckfield: Naval & Military Press, 2014, ISBN 978-1-78331-085-2.
- Capt the Earl of Rosse & Col E.R. Hill, The Story of the Guards Armoured Division, London: Geoffrey Bles, 1956/Barnsley: Pen & Sword, 2017, ISBN 978-1-52670-043-8.
- Brig N.W. Routledge, History of the Royal Regiment of Artillery: Anti-Aircraft Artillery 1914–55, London: Royal Artillery Institution/Brassey's, 1994, ISBN 1-85753-099-3
- Cornelius Ryan, A Bridge Too Far, London: Hamish Hamilton, 1974/Coronet 1975, ISBN 0-340-19941-5.

== External sources ==
- Imperial War Museum, War Memorials Register
- 70 Bde page at North East War Memorials Project
