= 40th Light Anti-Aircraft Regiment, Royal Artillery =

40th Light Anti-Aircraft Regiment, RA 540 Light Anti-Aircraft Regiment, RA
- Cap badge of the Royal Artillery
- Active: 27 September 1939 – 30 September 1950
- Country: United Kingdom
- Branch: Territorial Army
- Role: Air defence
- Size: Regiment
- Part of: Anti-Aircraft Command; 51st (Highland) Infantry Division
- Garrison/HQ: Inverness
- Engagements: The Blitz; Alamein; Tunisia; Sicily; Normandy; Operation Totalize; Reichswald; Rhine

The 40th Light Anti-Aircraft Regiment, Royal Artillery, (40th LAA Rgt) was a Scottish air defence unit of Britain's Territorial Army (TA) during World War II. After serving with Anti-Aircraft Command in the defence of the UK, it joined 51st (Highland) Infantry Division and served with it at Alamein, in Tunisia and Sicily. It landed in Normandy on D + 1 and fought through the campaign in North West Europe, including the crossing of the Rhine, until VE Day. The regiment was reformed in the postwar TA but was amalgamated with other Scottish anti-aircraft units in 1950.

== Origin ==
The regiment was formed as part of the rapid expansion of Britain's anti-aircraft (AA) defences at the beginning of World War II. Regimental Headquarters (RHQ) was formed on 27 September 1939 at Inverness in Scotland (the last new TA LAA regiment), with 105 and 140 LAA Batteries under command, and the regiment received its number on 17 October. 105 LAA Battery had been formed in the Orkneys during the mobilisation of the TA on 25–27 August 1939, just before the outbreak of war. It had 283 and 284 Troops at Lyness and 285 and 286 Trps at Hatston. 140 LAA Battery was formed in Caithness at the same time as RHQ and included the existing 148 Independent LAA Trp, which had been formed by the TA at Invergordon Royal Navy Oil Depot on 17 January 1939 and was transferred from 14th (West Lothian, Royal Scots) LAA Rgt. The new regiment was completed on 10 November when 177 (Aberdeen) LAA Bty was formed at Aberdeen.

== World War II ==
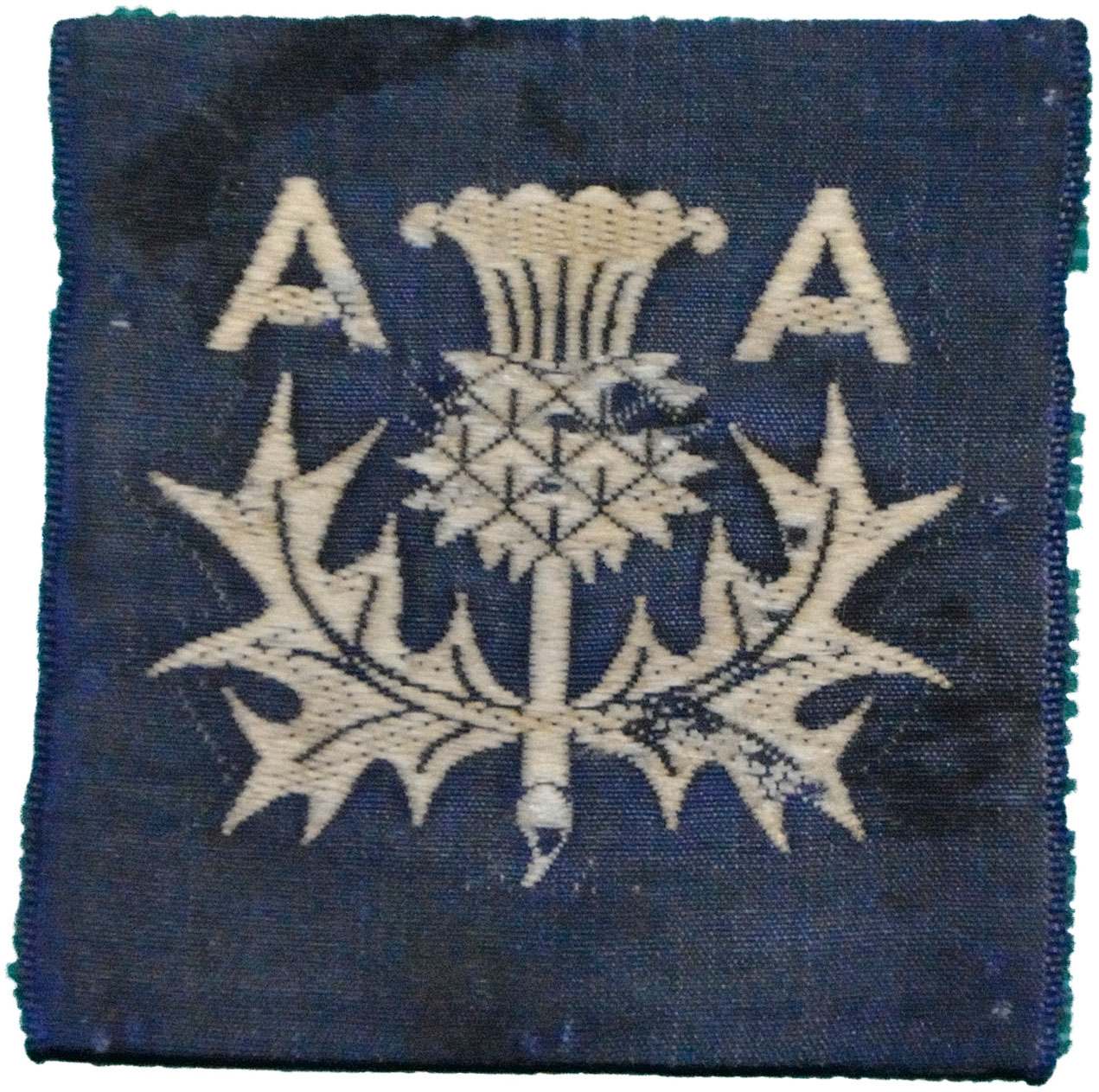
3rd AA Division's formation sign.

=== Battle of Britain and Blitz ===
At the start of the war most LAA units were armed with Light machine guns (AALMGs), but the new Bofors 40 mm gun was on order. The units were deployed to defend vulnerable points (VPs) such as bridges, factories or airfields against low-flying or dive-bombing daylight raids, but could do little against high-flying or night raiders, such as the heavy night raid on Aberdeen on 12 July at the start of the Battle of Britain.

40th LAA Regiment spent the whole of the Battle of Britain and the subsequent night Blitz on Britain's cities as part of 51st Light AA Brigade, covering North East Scotland in 3rd AA Division. The naval base at Invergordon was a particularly sensitive VP for this division. However, NE Scotland received few attacks during this period.

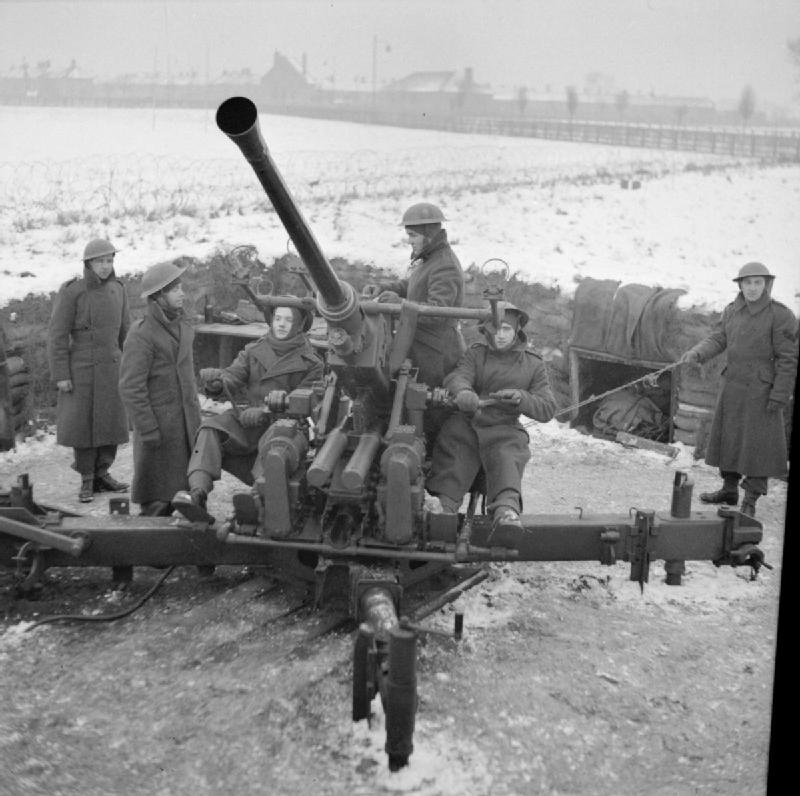
Bofors gun crew under training

The Blitz is considered to have ended in May 1941. 177 LAA Battery transferred to the newly formed 84th LAA Rgt at Glasgow on 23 August 1941 and was replaced on 4 September by 268 LAA Bty. This battery had been formed by 234th LAA Training Rgt at Carlisle on 12 June, based on a cadre of experienced officers and other ranks supplied by 40th LAA Rgt. 40th LAA Regiment remained in 51st AA Bde to the end of 1941.

=== Overseas training ===
40th LAA Regiment was now selected for overseas service as a mobile unit and it left AA Command late in February 1942 (105 LAA Bty had already left in late December). Since few AA units had any experience or training for mobile warfare, it had been ordered in 1941 that any unit rostered for a mobile role overseas must first be withdrawn for training under War Office control in 11th AA Bde. The climax of this training was a full-scale test on an exercise under close scrutiny. Regiments that failed to meet the right standards were rejected and sent for retraining or the replacement of key personnel. 40th LAA Regiment passed through 11th AA Bde in April.

51st (Highland) Division's formation sign.

On 1 May 1942 the regiment (with 105, 140 and 268 LAA Btys) joined 51st (Highland) Infantry Division (51st HD) and remained as the division's LAA component for the rest of the war. At the time 51st HD was under GHQ Home Forces, preparing for embarkation. It sailed on 16 June for the Middle East.

The division landed in Egypt on 12 August, just after Gen Erwin Rommel's advance on Egypt had been halted at the First Battle of El Alamein. Although its arrival had been eagerly anticipated, the division was not yet desert-ready and was not immediately thrown into action: while the Battle of Alam el Halfa was fought parts of the division were guarding landing grounds in the rear areas. It joined Eighth Army on 10 September. At this point the regiment was equipped with 48 Bofors guns.

=== Alamein ===
Eighth Army was preparing for the Second Battle of El Alamein. Careful consideration was given to AA defence during the build-up. Instead of being deployed in circles round objectives, the LAA guns were sited on the attackers' likely lines of approach, where opening fire would not give away the presence of a likely target, and numerous dummy and alternatives positions were prepared. Within the divisions the control of LAA batteries was decentralised to brigade level, and a feature of the assault planning was the integration of the LAA guns into ground fire tasks in support of infantry and armour. When the initial artillery bombardment began on the night of 23 October, LAA batteries switched from defending the assembly areas to firing Tracer ammunition to mark the attacking units' boundaries in the dust and darkness.

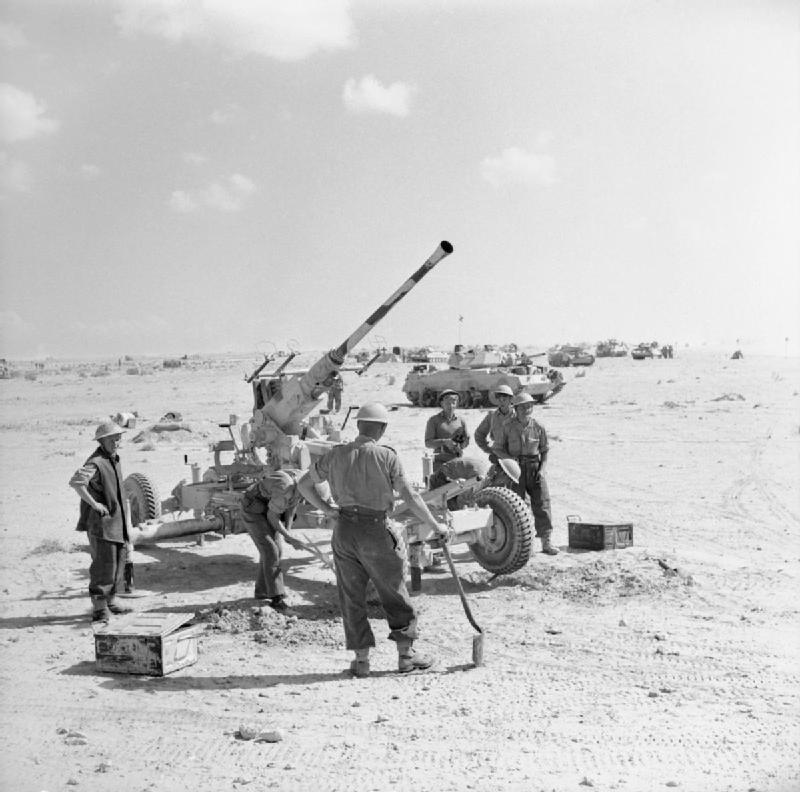
Bofors gun being emplaced in the Western Desert, 29 October 1942.

51st (H) Division's assault on 23 October ran into several centres of resistance and failed to take all its objectives. Over the following days the division worked to clear a way through the defences and minefields. On 2 November the division's renewed attack took its objectives and broke through. By late November Eighth Army was pursuing the beaten Axis forces to El Agheila.

On 23 January 1941 troops of 51st HD were among the first into Tripoli. The division remained outside the city while Eighth Army probed forward to Tunisia; 40th LAA Rgt with 35 Bofors was loaned to 2 AA Bde in Tripoli for XXX Corps defence tasks.

=== Tunisia ===
By 25 February part of 51st HD had reached Medenine, preparing for the set-piece attack on the Mareth Line. On 6 March it was in defensive positions to fight off a poorly-conceived German attack. On 16/17 March it began attacks on the Mareth outposts, and once the New Zealand Division had outflanked the formidable position, 51st HD was on its way to Gabès on 29 March. The next Axis defence line was at Wadi Akarit. This time 51st HD took part in the main assault on 6 April, breaking through the minefields and anti-tank ditches. It then moved on to play a smaller role in the fighting at Enfidaville and the final advance on Tunis. During this campaign the Axis air forces had been active, though mostly against ports and airfields. Divisional LAA was usually deployed to protect the artillery. In the rough country of Tunisia, LAA units were often engaged in 'snap' actions against fast low-flying aircraft, usually coming out of the sun. The batteries tended to abandon the Kerrison Predictor (Predictor No. 3) and rely on the simple 'Stiffkey Stick' sight.

=== Sicily ===
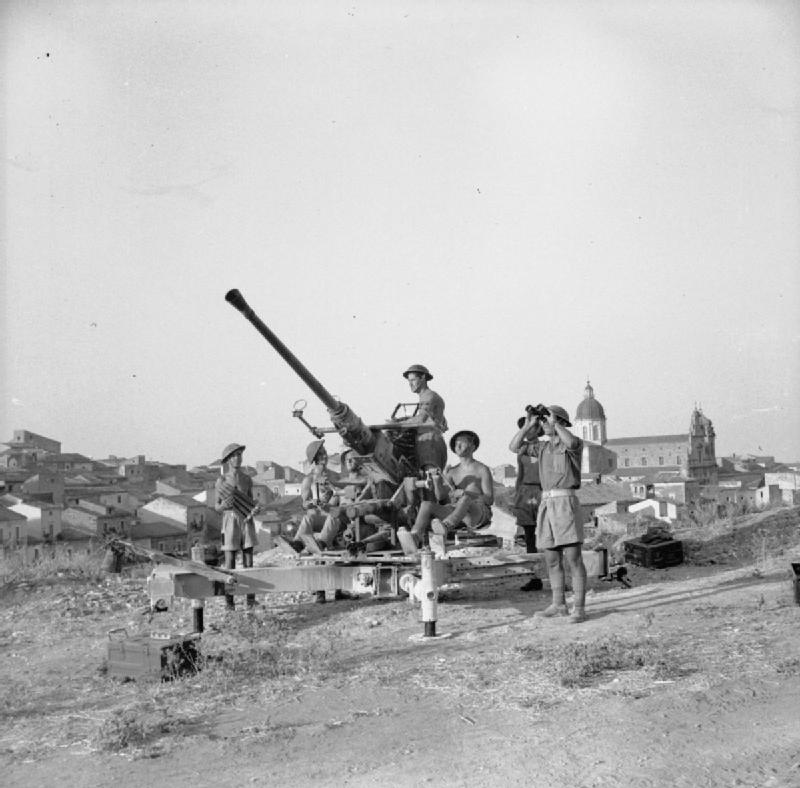
Bofors crew of 268 LAA Bty, 40th LAA Rgt on alert in Sicily, 16 July 1943.

51st (H) Division was designated for the assault landing in Sicily (Operation Husky) on 10 July 1943. 40th LAA Regiment's sea crossing was disrupted when the ships were attacked by U-boats and aircraft. Once ashore the divisional LAA regiments were assigned to beach defence, though they were hampered by the lack of a workable early-warning system. LAA batteries were reduced to firing prepared concentrations, either directional ('Curtains') or overhead ('Umbrellas'), which were ineffective and wasted scarce ammunition. However, the landings made good progress against negligible opposition, and 51st HD was well forward by nightfall. It was then directed to capture Palazzolo Acreide, which it achieved by the end of 12 July. The LAA unit handed over beach defence as the AA brigades began landing. 51st HD took Vizzini on the night of 14/15 July, and was then redirected towards the north east in a high-speed move to Paternò. However, resistance had stiffened, the division was unable to cross the River Simeto, and it had to fight hard to capture Gerbini Airfield. The division went onto the defensive on 21 July.

After Eighth Army had regrouped, 51st HD was employed in a thrust towards Adrano at the foot of Mount Etna, beginning with a crossing of the River Dittaino on the night of 31 July/1 August. It occupied Biancavilla on 6/7 August, when Adrano and Catania also fell. By 7 August (D + 28) 40 LAA Rgt was attached to 2 AA Bde, which was defending the airfields in the Plain of Catania. The Axis began withdrawing from Sicily on 11 August, and the campaign was over by 17 August.

=== Overlord Training ===
51st (H) Division was among the formations selected to be withdrawn from the Mediterranean Theatre to return with XXX Corps to the UK to train for the Allied invasion of Normandy (Operation Overlord). It left Sicily on 7 November 1943 and landed in the UK on 26 November. It then began an extended period of re-equipment and training.

On 14 March 1944 40th LAA Rgt's three batteries (105, 140 and 268) were augmented to a strength of four troops each when 51, 52 and 53 Trps joined from 235 LAA Bty of 62nd LAA Rgt, which had been broken up. This brought the establishment of Bofors guns up to 72, but before D-Day some LAA regiments began exchanging a proportion of their Bofors for multiple-barrelled 20 mm guns (usually Oerlikons or Polstens).

=== Normandy ===
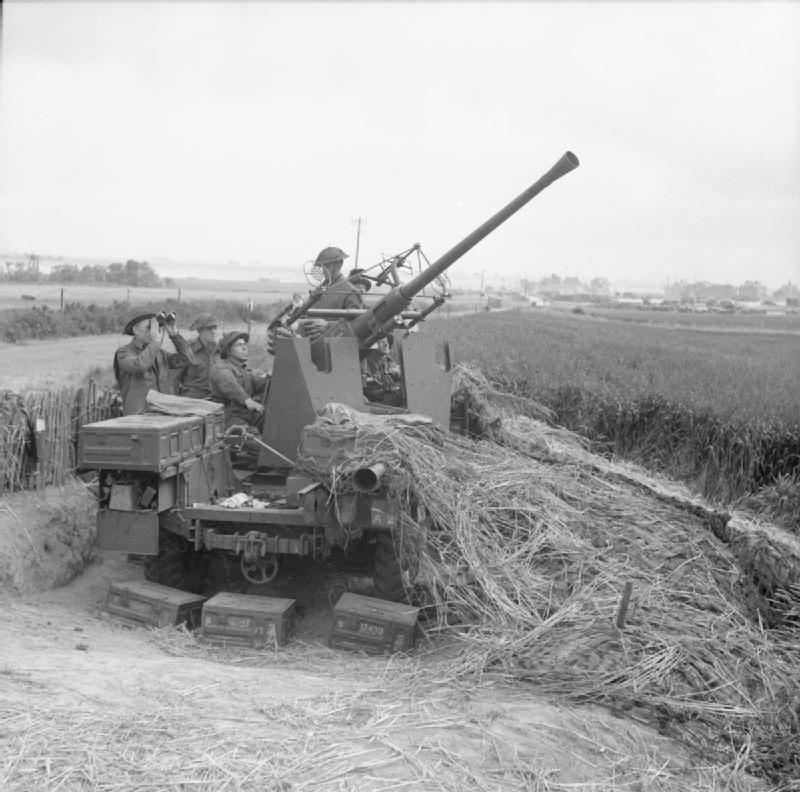
Bofors gun and crew in the Normandy beachhead, June 1944.

51st (H) Division was a follow-up formation for Overlord, landing on Juno Beach on 7 June (D + 1). It did not complete its assembly until 10 June, but then moved into the bridgehead across the River Orne in preparation for an advance southwards. This bridgehead was under heavy air attack, and the Luftwaffe had developed a pattern of daylight attacks by fighters and fighter-bombers, flying low and using cloud and terrain for cover, before making diving attacks out of the sun. The 20 mm and 40 mm Troops of 40th LAA Rgt, together with 92nd (Loyals) and 4th Canadian LAA Rgts, were in constant daily action in the bridgehead, shooting down 17 enemy aircraft between them and driving off many other attacks.

The division's attack out of the Orne bridgehead on 11 June came to nothing, but it continued to work its way down the east side of Caen, particularly on 23 June. An attack on the Colombelles factory area on 11 July ended in failure. On 18 July it cooperated on the flank of the armoured attack in Operation Goodwood.

As the campaign in Normandy developed the Allies achieved air superiority over the beachhead, so there was little call for AA defence and AA units became increasingly used to supplement the divisional artillery to support ground operations. LAA units fired tracer to guide night attacks onto their objectives, and the Bofors guns were much in demand for infantry support. They could give useful close-range fire to help infantry working from cover to cover in the bocage; its rapid fire was good for suppressing enemy heavy weapons, the 40 mm round's sensitive percussion fuze providing an airburst effect among trees. It was also used for 'bunker-busting', though the lack of protection made the gun detachment vulnerable to return fire. LAA units also provided 'refuge strips' for air observation post aircraft spotting for the field guns: a Bofors troop deployed with local warning radar and ground observers could alert the pilot to the presence of enemy aircraft and provide protection for him.

After a long period fighting in the Bocage country, Operation Totalize carried out by II Canadian Corps (including 51st HD) on the night of 7/8 August attempted to complete the breakthrough. As the infantry went forward in Armoured Personnel Carriers the Bofors fired streams of tracer to show the way (though the supporting armour units complained that this interfered with magnetic compasses and radio beacons). After a successful first phase, the operation bogged down next day.

Operation Tractable on 14 August completed the breakthrough, with 51st HD protecting the Canadians' flank, and by 23 August the division was across the River Risle, then captured Lisieux and moved on to the River Seine. It took part in Operation Astonia (10–12 September) to liberate Le Havre, beginning with another night attack. Afterwards, 51st HD was 'grounded' so that its transport could be used to speed up First Canadian Army's advance to Antwerp.

=== Low Countries ===
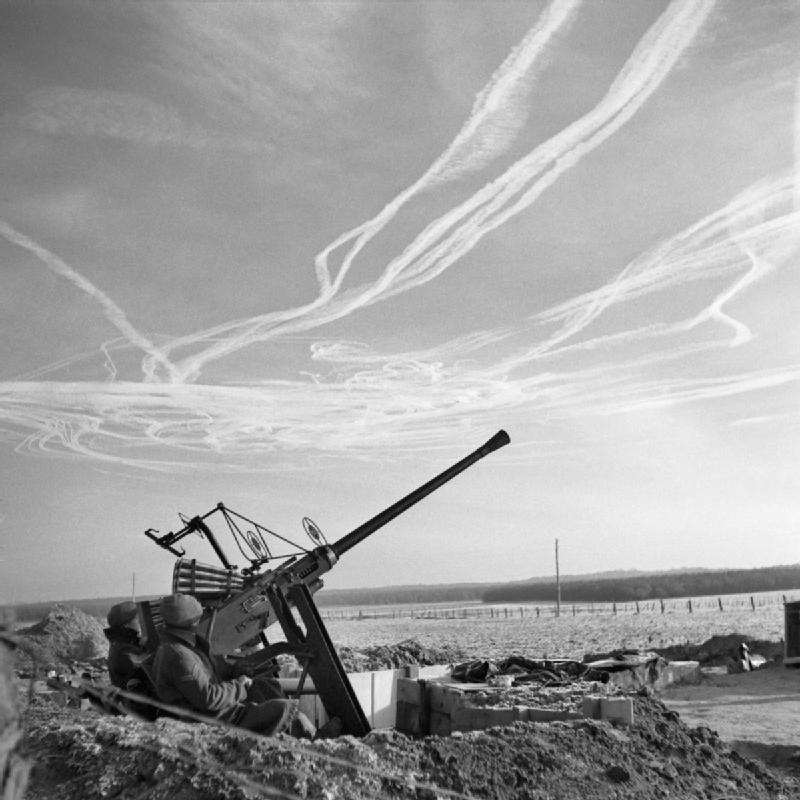
A Bofors crew watches aircraft vapour trails above the German border, 25 December 1944.

The division next made a long move to the Antwerp area at the end of September, then spent three weeks in the line at Sint-Oedenrode. 51st (H) Division was brought back into the line in October for the operations towards 's-Hertogenbosch to clear the Antwerp area. By the end of the month, after tough fighting, the division had pushed forwards to the River Maas. The division was then moved to hold 'The Island', the wet low-lying country between Nijmegen and Arnhem, until in mid-December the division was pulled out of the line for rest. In December the division was suddenly moved south as part of the response to the German breakthrough in the Ardennes (the Battle of the Bulge), and 51st HD fought its way into the flank of the 'Bulge' in winter conditions. When the Luftwaffe launched its Operation Bodenplatte against Allied airfields on 1 January 1945, GHQ AA Troops for 21st Army Group reported that '40 mm LAA had the time of its life' shooting down large numbers of raiders.

=== Germany ===
51st (H) Division was next engaged in the fighting in the Reichswald (Operation Veritable) under XXX Corps. The corps launched its attack at 05.00 on 8 February, and as the field and medium artillery concentrated on the enemy's batteries, command posts and communication centres, the divisional LAA regiments took part in the 'Pepperpot', in which guns and mortars of all calibres saturated the enemy positions in front of the assaulting infantry. The slow advance continued through Gennep on 11 February, then German counter-attacks were driven off. The final phase of 'Veritable' for 51st HD began on 18 February against Goch, which was successfully taken after stiff fighting.

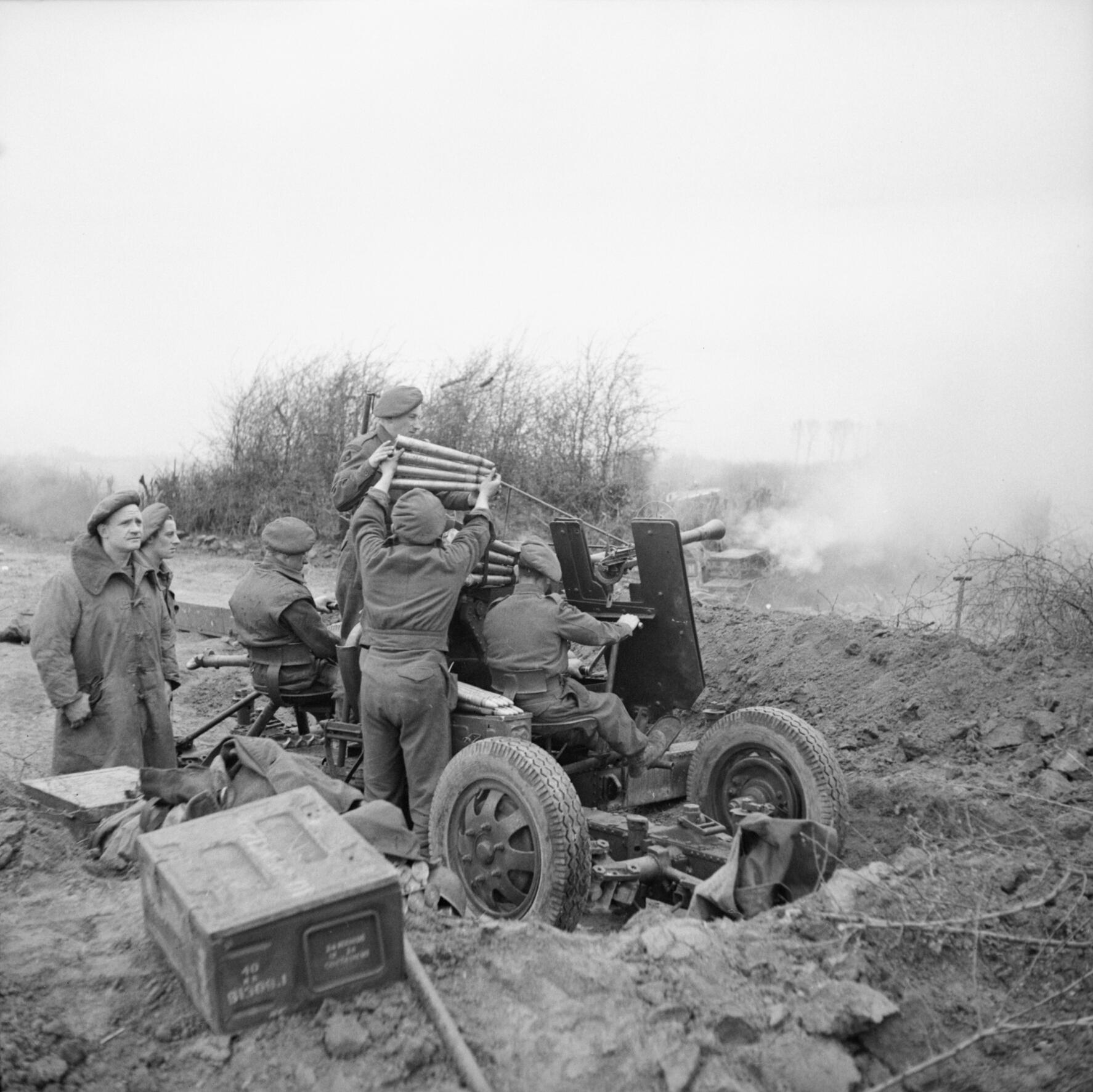
Bofors gun in the ground support role east of the Rhine, 26 March 1945.

Second Army then made preparations to cross the Rhine in Operation Plunder. 51st (H) Division was tasked with making the initial assault crossing on XXX Corps' front (Operation Turnscrew). The vast build-up of forces, ammunition and supply dumps was a major AA defence task. Defending the bridgeheads after the crossing was another vital task, so getting AA units across early would be crucial. When the operation was launched on the night of 23/24 March, 40th LAA Rgt took part in the corps 'Pepperpot', its Bofors firing 11 serials, each lasting two minutes, in bursts of 10 rounds at 'automatic'. It also fired low-angle tracer lines to guide the amphibious Buffaloes crossing the river in darkness, and then engaged ground targets in support of the assault. By dawn the regiment's ammunition expenditure was 19,000 rounds, or over 500 rounds per gun. The division's infantry began fighting their way into Rees while the Sappers began rafting across equipment and began building their bridges. It was not until after dark on 24 March that small numbers of Luftwaffe aircraft appeared, making dive-bombing attacks from medium and low altitude, which were countered by searchlights and LAA guns. During the third night, 25/26 March, the Luftwaffe made further attempts to disrupt the bridgebuilding, this time from greater height. The first bridges in XXX Corps sector were operational on the morning of D + 2 (26 March) and the first 40 mm guns across were 105 LAA Bty of 40th LAA Rgt to catch up with 51st HD's advance and give some protection to its field gun positions. The pace of the advance increased on 27 and 28 March and the Luftwaffe switched its attention from the bridges to the columns advancing across North Germany.

By this stage of the war divisional LAA regiments were receiving quadruple 0.5-inch Browning machine guns on self-propelled (SP) mountings (the M51 Quadmount) in place of a proportion of their Bofors guns, to improve their capability against 'snap' attacks by the new German jet fighter-bombers. Under this arrangement a troop comprised four SP or towed Bofors and two quadruple SP Brownings. However, 40th LAA Rgt only received its Brownings when 'Plunder' was nearly over.

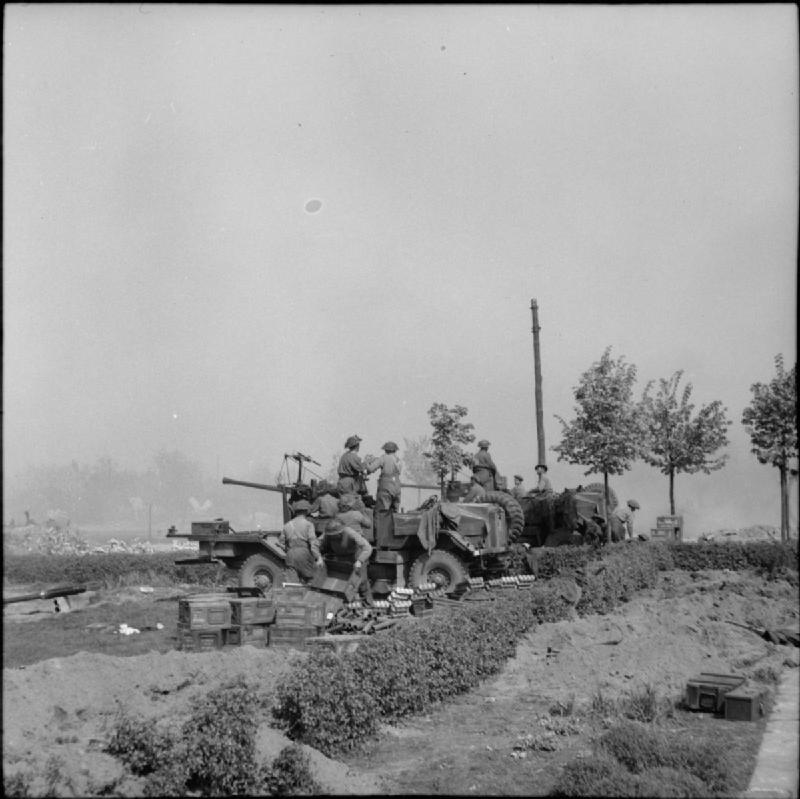
SP Bofors in action against German positions at Bremen 26 April 1945.

The division reached the Dortmund–Ems Canal on 8 April. After a pause at the canal, it advanced rapidly towards Bremen against delaying actions. During these advances the Luftwaffe attacked bridging sites, artillery positions and road movements. For the divisional LAA guns most of these involved 'snap' actions, against low-flying attackers using cloud cover, and often using jet aircraft. 51st (H) Division reached Delmenhorst on 20 April and closed in on the centre of Bremen. The number of Luftwaffe attacks on the advancing divisions peaked in the last week of the war before the German surrender at Lüneburg Heath came on 4 May.

51st (Highland) Division's units were then employed as occupation forces in XXX Corps' district in Germany. 40th LAA Regiment and its three batteries passed into suspended animation in British Army of the Rhine on 1 March 1946.

== Postwar ==
When the TA was reconstituted on 1 January 1947, the regiment reformed at Inverness as 540 LAA Regiment. It formed part of 78 AA Bde based in Perth.

However, on 30 September 1950 the regiment was amalgamated with 532 LAA Rgt at Falkirk and 677 (Lovat Scouts) Mountain Rgt at Inverness to form 532 (Lovat Scouts) LAA Rgt (which adopted the number 540 in 1954).

== Notes ==
- John Buckley, Monty's Men: The British Army and the Liberation of Europe, London: Yale University Press, 2013, ISBN 978-0-300-13449-0.
- Basil Collier, History of the Second World War, United Kingdom Military Series: The Defence of the United Kingdom, London: HM Stationery Office, 1957/Uckfield: Naval & Military, 2004 ISBN 978-1-84574-055-9.
- Maj L.F. Ellis, History of the Second World War, United Kingdom Military Series: Victory in the West, Vol I: The Battle of Normandy, London: HM Stationery Office, 1962/Uckfield: Naval & Military, 2004, ISBN 1-845740-58-0.
- Maj L.F. Ellis, History of the Second World War, United Kingdom Military Series: Victory in the West, Vol II: The Defeat of Germany, London: HM Stationery Office, 1968/Uckfield: Naval & Military, 2004, ISBN 1-845740-59-9.
- Gen Sir Martin Farndale, History of the Royal Regiment of Artillery: The Years of Defeat: Europe and North Africa, 1939–1941, Woolwich: Royal Artillery Institution, 1988/London: Brasseys, 1996, ISBN 1-85753-080-2.
- J.B.M. Frederick, Lineage Book of British Land Forces 1660–1978, Vol II, Wakefield: Microform Academic, 1984, ISBN 1-85117-009-X.
- Lt-Gen Sir Brian Horrocks, A Full Life, London: Collins, 1960.
- Joslen, H. F. (2003) [1960]. Orders of Battle: Second World War, 1939–1945. Uckfield, East Sussex: Naval and Military Press. ISBN 978-1-84342-474-1.
- Lt-Col Martin Lindsay, So Few Got Through, London: Collins, 1946/Arrow Books (pbk; nd)/Leo Cooper, 2000, ISBN 0850527546.
- Norman E.H. Litchfield, The Territorial Artillery 1908–1988 (Their Lineage, Uniforms and Badges), Nottingham: Sherwood Press, 1992, ISBN 0-9508205-2-0.
- Brig C.J.C. Molony,History of the Second World War, United Kingdom Military Series: The Mediterranean and Middle East, Vol V: The Campaign in Sicily 1943 and the Campaign in Italy 3rd September 1943 to 31st March 1944, London: HM Stationery Office, 1973/Uckfield, Naval & Military Press, 2004, ISBN 1-845740-69-6.
- Maj-Gen I.S.O. Playfair, History of the Second World War, United Kingdom Military Series: The Mediterranean and Middle East, Vol III: (September 1941 to September 1942) British Fortunes reach their Lowest Ebb, London: HM Stationery Office, 1960 /Uckfield, Naval & Military Press, 2004, ISBN 1-845740-67-X
- Maj-Gen I.S.O. Playfair & Brig C.J.C. Molony, History of the Second World War, United Kingdom Military Series: The Mediterranean and Middle East, Vol IV: The Destruction of the Axis forces in Africa, London: HM Stationery Office, 1966/Uckfield, Naval & Military Press, 2004, ISBN 1-845740-68-8.
- Brig N.W. Routledge, History of the Royal Regiment of Artillery: Anti-Aircraft Artillery 1914–55, London: Royal Artillery Institution/Brassey's, 1994, ISBN 1-85753-099-3.
- Tim Saunders, Battleground Europe: Operation Plunder: The British and Canadian Rhine Crossing, Barnsley: Pen & Sword, 2006, ISBN 1-84415-221-9.

== External sources ==
- British Army units 1945 on
- Orders of Battle at Patriot Files
- Graham Watson, The Territorial Army 1947
