= 89th Light Anti-Aircraft Regiment, Royal Artillery =

11th Battalion, Buffs (Royal East Kent Regiment) 89th Light Anti-Aircraft Regiment, RA
- Cap badge of the Royal Artillery
- Active: January 1940–20 November 1945
- Country: United Kingdom
- Branch: British Army
- Role: Infantry; Air defence
- Size: Battalion; Regiment
- Part of: 49th (West Riding) Infantry Division
- Engagements: Operation Martlet; Operation Greenline; Operation Astonia; Operation Pheasant; Operation Quick Anger

The 89th Light Anti-Aircraft Regiment, Royal Artillery, (89th LAA Rgt) was an air defence unit of the British Army during World War II. Initially raised as an infantry battalion of the Buffs in 1940, it transferred to the Royal Artillery in 1941. It served with 49th (West Riding) Infantry Division in Normandy (Operation Overlord) and through the campaign in North West Europe until VE Day.

== 11th Battalion, Buffs (Royal East Kent Regiment) ==
The unit was originally formed in January 1940 as a company of 14th (Holding) Battalion at Tonbridge in Kent, as part of the rapid expansion of the Army with wartime conscripts. When 14th (H) Battalion was disbanded on 28 May 1940, the company was expanded into 50th Holding Battalion, Buffs (Royal East Kent Regiment), and converted to a normal infantry battalion on 9 October that year as 11th Battalion, Buffs.

On 26 October it joined 219th Independent Infantry Brigade (Home) which was being organised as a static defence formation. The brigade was temporarily attached to 45th Division, at that time serving in I Corps in the invasion-threatened south-east corner of Kent. The brigade remained in position while the mobile divisions were swapped around: next it came under 44th (Home Counties) Division and then 43rd (Wessex) Infantry Division.

== 89th Light Anti-Aircraft Regiment ==
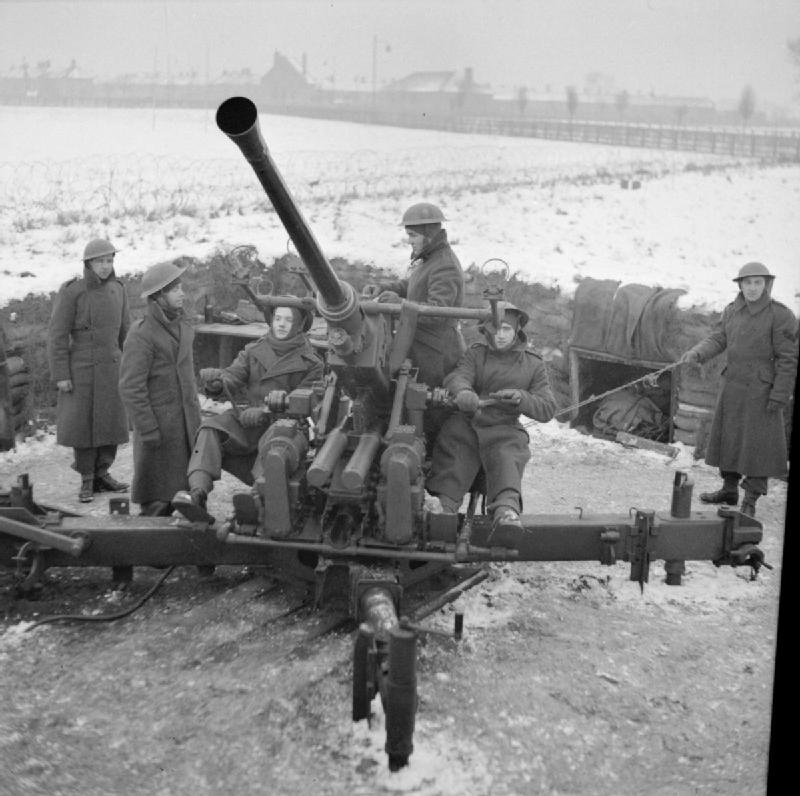
A Bofors 40 mm LAA gun crew under training, January 1942.

11th Buffs left 219th Bde on 3 November 1941 and transferred to the Royal Artillery (RA) to begin retraining in the light anti-aircraft (LAA) role, equipped with Bofors 40 mm guns: on 15 November it became 89th LAA Regiment with 308–310 LAA Batteries. Surplus men were drafted on 26 November to 211th Heavy AA Training Regiment at Oswestry where they joined a new 494 (Mixed) Heavy AA Bty that was being formed for 143rd (Mixed) HAA Rgt ('Mixed' indicating that women from the Auxiliary Territorial Service were integrated into the unit's personnel).

After initial training, 89th LAA Rgt joined 2nd Division on 24 January 1942. However, that division was under War Office control preparatory to going overseas, and 89th LAA Rgt left on 24 March 1942 before the division embarked for India in April. It became part of the GHQ Reserve in early August 1942, before joining 49th (West Riding) Infantry Division on 29 December 1942. It served with that formation for the rest of the war. During December Lieutenant-Colonel H.C. Cory, MC, was transferred from 66th Anti-Tank Regiment, Royal Artillery, to command the unit.

=== Overlord training ===
Formation sign of 49th (West Riding) Division.

Earlier in the war, 49th (WR) Division had been split up for service in the Norwegian Campaign and the Allied Invasion of Iceland. Now, returned to the UK, it had been reorganised in Western Command and was training for the planned Allied invasion of Normandy (Operation Overlord). In April 1943 it was assigned to I Corps in 21st Army Group (though it was actually in XXX Corps by D Day).

At the beginning of 1943, 89th LAA Rgt was stationed at Pembroke Dock, and during the month its batteries carried out practice shoots at No 3 AA Practice Camp at nearby Manorbier. When not training, the field force LAA regiments were sent on short attachments with Anti-Aircraft Command for Air Defence of Great Britain (ADGB) duty on the South Coast of England, where all available LAA guns were needed to defend against 'hit and run' attacks by Luftwaffe Fighter-bombers. On 9 February the regiment moved to Hamble, near Southampton, where it took over operational LAA sites from 94th LAA Rgt. Then at the end of the month it moved to a concentration area to take part in Exercise Spartan (3–15 March), after which it returned to Pembroke Dock. The batteries carried out practice firing at Penally Range. From 14 to 23 April the regiment took part in Exercise Bombard, after which it went to Stewarton in Scotland before returning to Pembroke Dock on 8 May.

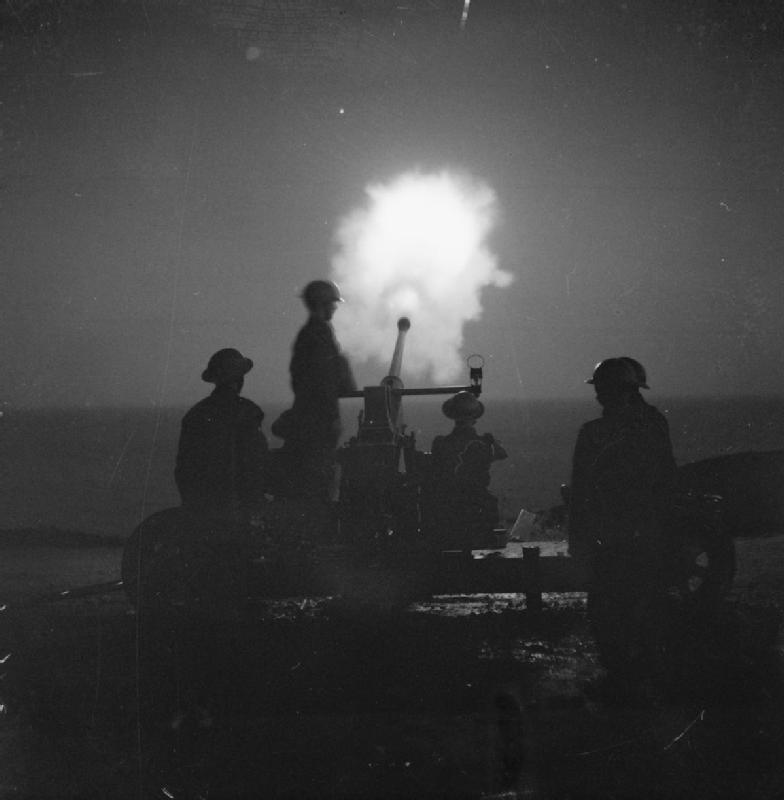
Bofors gun firing at Manorbier practice camp.

On 1 June 1943 Regimental Headquarters (RHQ) moved to Rustington in Sussex where the batteries took over ADGB operational sites at Littlehampton, Bognor Regis and Farnborough, Hampshire. On 21 June RHQ moved to Wakes Colne in Essex and took over ADGB sites at Thames Haven, Ipswich, Frinton-on-Sea, Clacton-on-Sea and Walton-on-the-Naze. In July the regiment was at No 9 Practice Camp, Cark, then went back to Stewarton at the end of the month. On 15 August RHQ arrived at Hove for Exercise Harlequin, with 308 LAA Bty at Shoreham-by-Sea, 309 LAA Bty at Newhaven and 310 LAA Bty at Lewes. After the month-long exercise the regiment left the south coast for Scotland on 19 September, arriving at Dumbarton on 23 September. Exercise Bridgehead was held during October, after which the batteries began attending courses at the Combined Operations Training Centre at Inverary. On 14 December the regiment moved out of Dumbarton on its way to a new location at Great Yarmouth in Norfolk, arriving on 17 December.

On 14 March 1944 the regiment's three batteries were augmented to a strength of four troops each when 503 Independent LAA Bty (formerly of 149th (Sherwood Foresters) LAA Rgt) joined and was broken up to form 78–80 Trps. This brought the establishment of Bofors guns up to 72, but before D Day many divisional LAA regiments exchanged some of their Bofors for multiple-barrelled 20 mm guns (usually Oerlikons or Polstens). Usually half the Bofors troops operated self-propelled (SP) guns.

=== Normandy ===
As a follow-up formation for 'Overlord', 49th (WR) Division sailed on D Day (6 June 1944) and landed in Normandy on 12 June. The division was involved in some stiff fighting on 18 June but was committed to its first major action in the Battle of the Odon, beginning on 25 June after a weather delay. The task for 49th (WR) Division was to capture the Rauray Spur (Operation Martlet) as a preliminary to the main offensive by VIII Corps on 26 June (Operation Epsom). The infantry attacked at 04.15 through fields of crops with tank support behind a Creeping barrage and fought their way into Fontenay-le-Pesnel, but they had been disorganised by early morning mist, ran into fierce opposition, and although they held off a strong counter-attack, they ended the day about 1 mile (1.6 km) short of Rauray. The division made little more progress next day, but tanks secured a toehold on the spur by the end of the day. The division held onto the spur during another Panzer attack on 1 July, after which the battle died down.

21st Army Group slogged its way forward through the Bocage country. On 16 July, 49th (WR) Division took Vendes as part of Operation Greenline. Since the Allies had achieved air superiority over the beachhead, there was little call for AA defence, and AA units became increasingly used to supplement the divisional artillery to support ground operations. LAA units fired tracer to guide night attacks onto their objectives, and the Bofors guns were much in demand for infantry support. They could give useful close-range fire to help infantry working from cover to cover in the bocage; its rapid fire was good for suppressing enemy heavy weapons, the 40mm round's sensitive percussion fuze providing an airburst effect among trees. It was also used for 'bunker-busting', though the lack of protection made the gun detachment vulnerable to return fire. LAA units also provided 'refuge strips' for air observation post aircraft spotting for the field guns: a Bofors troop deployed with Local Warning radar and ground observers could alert the pilot to the presence of enemy aircraft and provide protection for him.

=== Clearing the ports ===
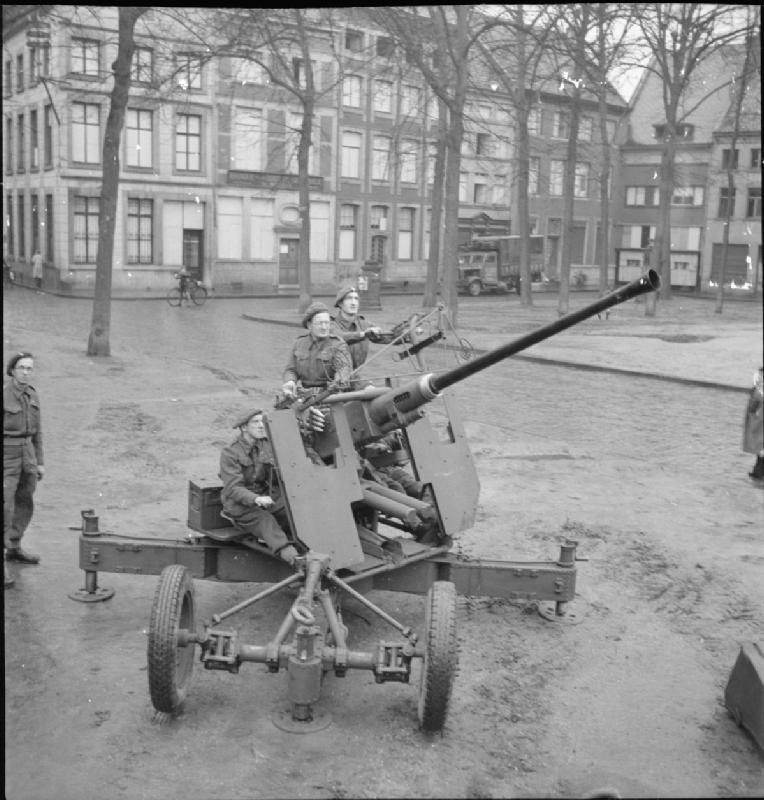
Bofors gun deployed in North West Europe, 1944.

On 25 July the division transferred back to I Corps, now under First Canadian Army. When the breakout from the Normandy beachhead finally began, the division fought its way down towards Falaise, and then swung east as First Canadian Army advanced along the coast to clear the Channel ports. 49th (WR) Division carried out a set-piece assault on heavily defended Le Havre on 10–12 September (Operation Astonia), The division was then moved quickly to the east of Antwerp to help open up that vital port (the Battle of the Scheldt). By early October it was fighting its way towards Tilburg.

For 17 days in October, while these operations were proceeding, a 7,000 yards (6,400 m) length of I Corps' front was held by 'Bobforce', led by 89th LAA Rgt with armoured cars, anti-tank guns, two machine gun companies and a Belgian infantry battalion. It was later joined by the corps regiment, 102nd LAA, acting as infantry. At the end of this spell, Bobforce advanced under covering fire from Bofors guns and drive the enemy rearguards back 3 miles (4.8 km).

On 20 October, 49th (WR) Division was attacking northwards towards Wuustwezel as part of Operation Pheasant, taking about 500 prisoners. But next day Divisional HQ in the woods nearby came under attack, and the divisional assets at HQ, including specialised armour ('funnies') attached from 79th Armoured Division, had to fight off infantry and SP guns, and then counter-attack. On 22 October the division was advancing towards Breda when it was attacked again, by a German division intent on recapturing Wuustwezel: the attack was defeated with heavy losses to the Germans. 49th (WR) Division pushed on to Roosendaal against stiff opposition. The town was expected to be strongly held and the division laid on a set-piece attack with all available guns, but found the town abandoned. It was then ordered to secure the roads north towards the River Maas.

The division was then switched eastwards, where it came under XII Corps and was stationed facing the heavily fortified town of Blerick, which was the last significant German bridgehead on the west bank of the Maas. On 28 November it was relieved by 15th (Scottish) Infantry Division, which was to carry out the actual assault (Operation Guildford), while 49th went to 21st Army Group's own bridgehead over the River Waal at Nijmegen under II Canadian Corps.

=== Winter 1944–1945 ===
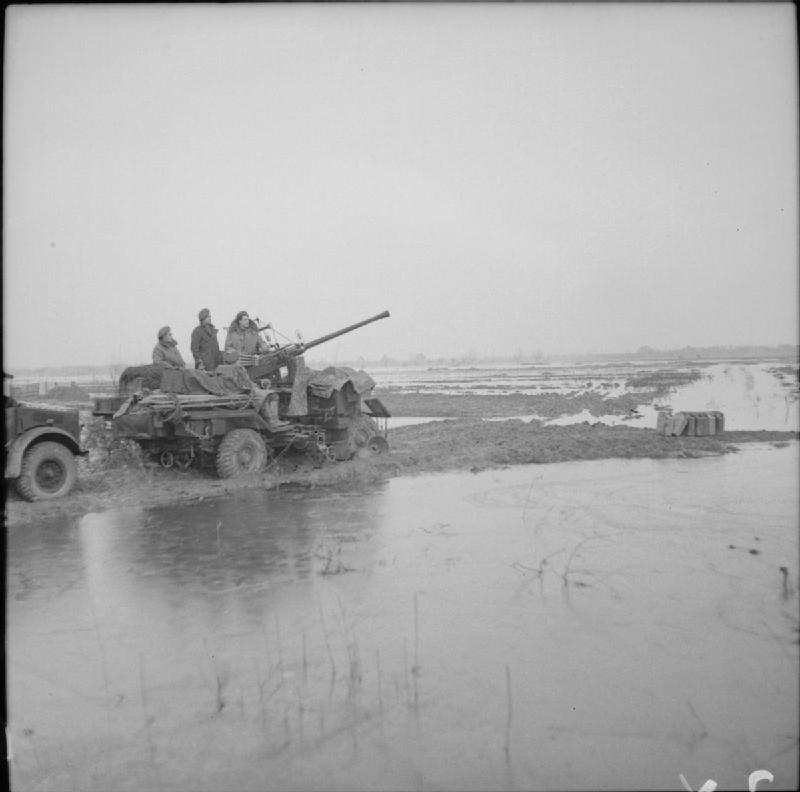
SP Bofors of 89th LAA at Elst in Holland, December 1944

The land between the Waal and the Rhine was known as 'The Island' and much of it was deliberately flooded by the Germans during the winter of 1944–45. Elst, where part of the regiment was stationed, was almost surrounded by floodwaters. The German 6th Parachute Division then made a ground attack on the Nijmegen bridgehead, infiltrating between the isolated British positions, but was driven out. Apart from occasional single aircraft, usually jets, the Luftwaffe kept away from the well-defended bridgehead. Most LAA units saw more action in ground firing roles than for AA defence. However, the local attack at Nijmegen had been a precursor to the Germans' major Ardennes Offensive (the Battle of the Bulge). Bad weather grounded the Luftwaffe until the battle was almost over, but on 1 January 1945 it launched Operation Bodenplatte against Allied airfields. Aircraft appeared all over 21st Army Group's area, suffering heavy casualties: GHQ AA Troops reported that '40 mm LAA had the time of its life'.

6th Parachute Division made a new attack on 49th (WR) Division on 18 January 1945 after the floods began to subside. They overran some outposts but had been driven out by 21 January, with serious casualties on both sides.

21st Army Group began its offensive into the Reichswald (Operation Veritable) on 8 February; XXX Corps opened the attack, then II Canadian Corps was fed in on 15 February, leaving 49th (WR) Division on The Island. Nijmegen bridge was strongly attacked from the air on 8/9 February, but the LAA fire in the area was effective in preventing serious damage. By this stage of the war divisional LAA regiments had started to receive quadruple 0.5-inch Browning machine guns on SP mountings (the M51 Quadmount) in place of a proportion of their Bofors guns, to improve their capability against 'snap' attacks by the new German jet fighter-bombers. Under this arrangement a troop comprised four SP or towed Bofors and two quadruple SP Brownings.

49th (WR) Division also had no role in the crossing of the Rhine (Operation Plunder) at the end of March. By now it was part of Netherlands District under First Canadian Army. However, during early April the division began the task of clearing The Island. Its last major operation was the Liberation of Arnhem (Operation Anger), which took four days (12–16 April) and involved an assault crossing of the IJssel after which heavy equipment was rafted across by the Sappers. The division then cleared the Northern Netherlands. In late April there was a ceasefire in the Northern Netherlands while food supplies were air-dropped to the Dutch population in the area still under German occupation (Operation Manna). The German surrender at Lüneburg Heath followed on 4 May.

After occupation duties in Europe 89th LAA Regiment was disbanded on 20 November 1945.

== External Sources ==
- King's Own Royal Lancaster Regiment Museum
- 70 Bde page at North East War Memorials Project
