= 62nd Light Anti-Aircraft Regiment, Royal Artillery =

62nd Light Anti-Aircraft Regiment, RA
- Cap badge of the Royal Artillery
- Active: 22 October 1940–15 April 1944
- Country: United Kingdom
- Branch: British Army
- Role: Air defence
- Size: Regiment
- Part of: Anti-Aircraft Command; 21st Army Group
- Engagements: The Blitz

The 62nd Light Anti-Aircraft Regiment, Royal Artillery, (62nd LAA Rgt) was an air defence unit of the British Army during World War II. After serving with Anti-Aircraft Command during and after the Blitz, it trained to take part in the Allied invasion of Normandy (Operation Overlord). However, shortly before D Day, it was broken up to reinforce other units that fought in the ensuing campaign.

== Origin ==
The regiment was formed as part of the rapid expansion of AA Command during The Blitz in the autumn of 1940. Regimental Headquarters (RHQ) was formed on 22 October at Perranporth, Cornwall, with 185 and 186 LAA Batteries, which had been formed on 15 September.

== The Blitz ==
1st AA Division's formation sign.

After initial training, the new regiment was assigned to 26th (London) AA Brigade in 1st AA Division. At that time the division was operating the London Inner Artillery Zone (IAZ) fighting the London Blitz. At this stage of the war most LAA units were still armed with Light machine guns (AALMGs), but the new Bofors 40 mm gun was arriving in increasing numbers. These units were deployed to defend vulnerable points (VPs) such as bridges, factories or airfields against low-flying or dive-bombing daylight raids, but could do little against high-flying night raiders during the Blitz.

The regiment was joined by 214 LAA Bty on 21 February 1941. This battery had been formed on 14 November by 224th LAA Training Rgt at Aberystwyth, based on a cadre of experienced officers and men provided by 42nd LAA Rgt. 62nd LAA Regiment provided its own cadre for 235 LAA Bty, which was formed by 208th LAA Training Rgt at Yeovil on 10 April and joined the regiment on 8 July. 62nd LAA Regiment was still in 26th AA Bde when the Blitz ended in May 1941.

== Mid-war ==
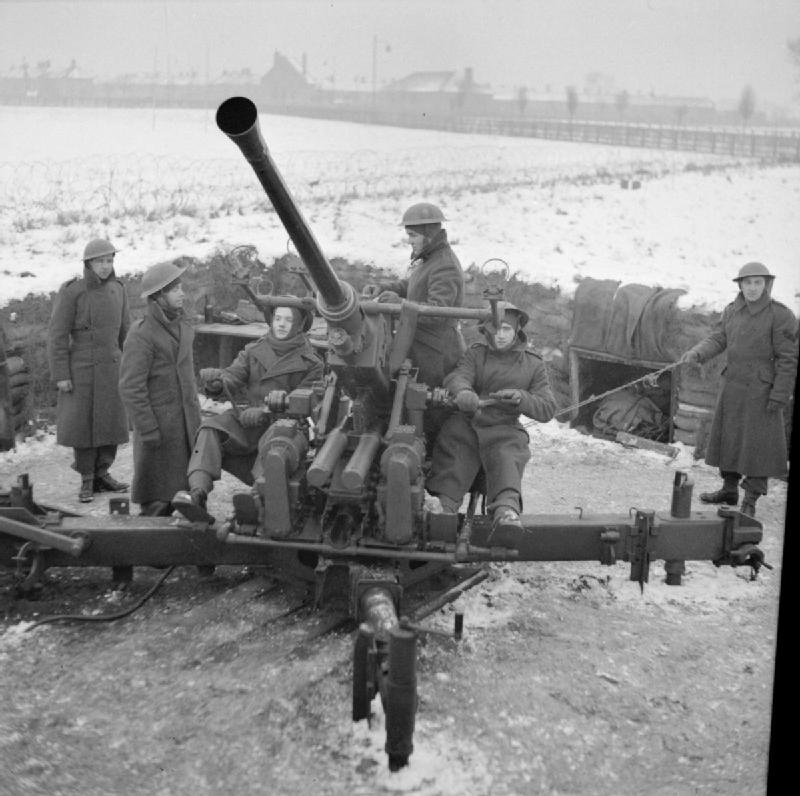
A Bofors 40 mm LAA gun crew under training, January 1942.

186 LAA Bty was attached to 49th AA Bde within the division until mid-June 1941 when it embarked for Malta as part of a much-needed AA reinforcement for the besieged island, which was under constant air attack. The battery arrived in Malta in August 1941 and joined 74th LAA Rgt there. It later served in the Allied landings in Sicily and Italy.

62nd LAA Regiment supplied another cadre to 208th LAA Training Rgt at Yeovil to form 292 LAA Bty on 7 August. This was regimented on 11 November when 185 LAA Bty left to provide the basis for a new 87th LAA Rgt. On 19 February 1942, the fourth Troops of each of the regiment's batteries (214, 235 and 292 by this stage) were detached and combined to form a new 456 LAA Bty within the regiment. This formed part of a new 141st LAA Rgt on 10 July. (Note: Transferring part of each battery to form a new battery that then left the regiment was a method sometimes used to remove the less physically fit personnel from a regiment selected for training for overseas deployment. For example, 73rd LAA Rgt (which landed on D Day), formed 466 LAA Bty from men of low medical categories; coincidentally, 466 LAA Bty also joined 141st LAA Rgt.)

62nd LAA Regiment remained in 26th (London) AA Bde until June 1942, when after a brief unbrigaded period it transferred to 49 AA Bde. By the summer of 1942 every available LAA gun was being deployed to the South Coast towns of England to defend against 'hit and run' attacks by Luftwaffe Fighter-bombers. In August, 214 LAA Bty was attached to 8th AA Division in South West England. By early November the whole regiment had transferred to 38th LAA Bde in 1 AA Group (which had replaced 1st AA Division), but left again shortly afterwards. It then moved to 63rd AA Bde in 6 AA Group covering South East England outside London.

== Mobile training ==
In March 1943 62nd LAA Rgt left AA Command and joined the field force under the control of the War Office, coming under the command of 75th LAA Bde during April. It gained its own detachment of the Royal Corps of Signals in May.

By 24 July 1943 the regiment was designated as a mobile unit assigned to 21st Army Group. All the units in 21st Army Group now entered a period of intense training for the planned Allied invasion of Normandy (Operation Overlord), for which 75th AA Bde was a follow-up formation.

== Disbandment ==
In early 1944 it was decided to increase the war establishment of the LAA regiments of the armoured and infantry divisions assigned to Overlord, particularly to man the multiple-barrelled 20 mm guns (usually Oerlikons or Polstens) that were being added to some regiments. 62nd LAA Regiment was broken up to provide some of the additional personnel. In the first phase, on 23 February, the regiment's troops were individually numbered:

- A, B and C Trps of 214 LAA Bty became 39, 40 and 50 Trps
- D, E and F Trps of 235 LAA Bty became 51, 52 and 53 Trps
- G, H and I Trps of 292 LAA Bty became 54, 55 and 56 Trps

In the second phase, on 14 March, these Troops were transferred to other regiments:

- 39, 40 and 50 Trps went to 317, 318 and 319 LAA Btys of 92nd (Loyals) LAA Rgt of 3rd Infantry Division
- 51, 52 and 53 Trps went to 105, 140 and 268 LAA Btys of 40th LAA Rgt of 51st (Highland) Infantry Division
- 54, 55 and 56 Trps went to 323, 324 and 325 LAA Btys of 94th LAA Rgt of Guards Armoured Division
  All three divisions landed in Normandy and fought in the campaign in North West Europe.

Finally, RHQ and the battery HQs of 214, 235 and 292 LAA Btys were disbanded by 15 April 1944.
