= Convento dell'Incontro =

Franciscan monastery in Florence, Italy

Convento dell'Incontro is a Franciscan monastery that sits on the highest hill top south west of Florence in Bagno a Ripoli.

The convent, founded in the early 18th century, is used in the 21st century as an accommodation and place of "spiritual retreats" for tourists, cyclists, and pilgrims.
