= Bagno a Ripoli =

- Comune
- Comune di Bagno a Ripoli
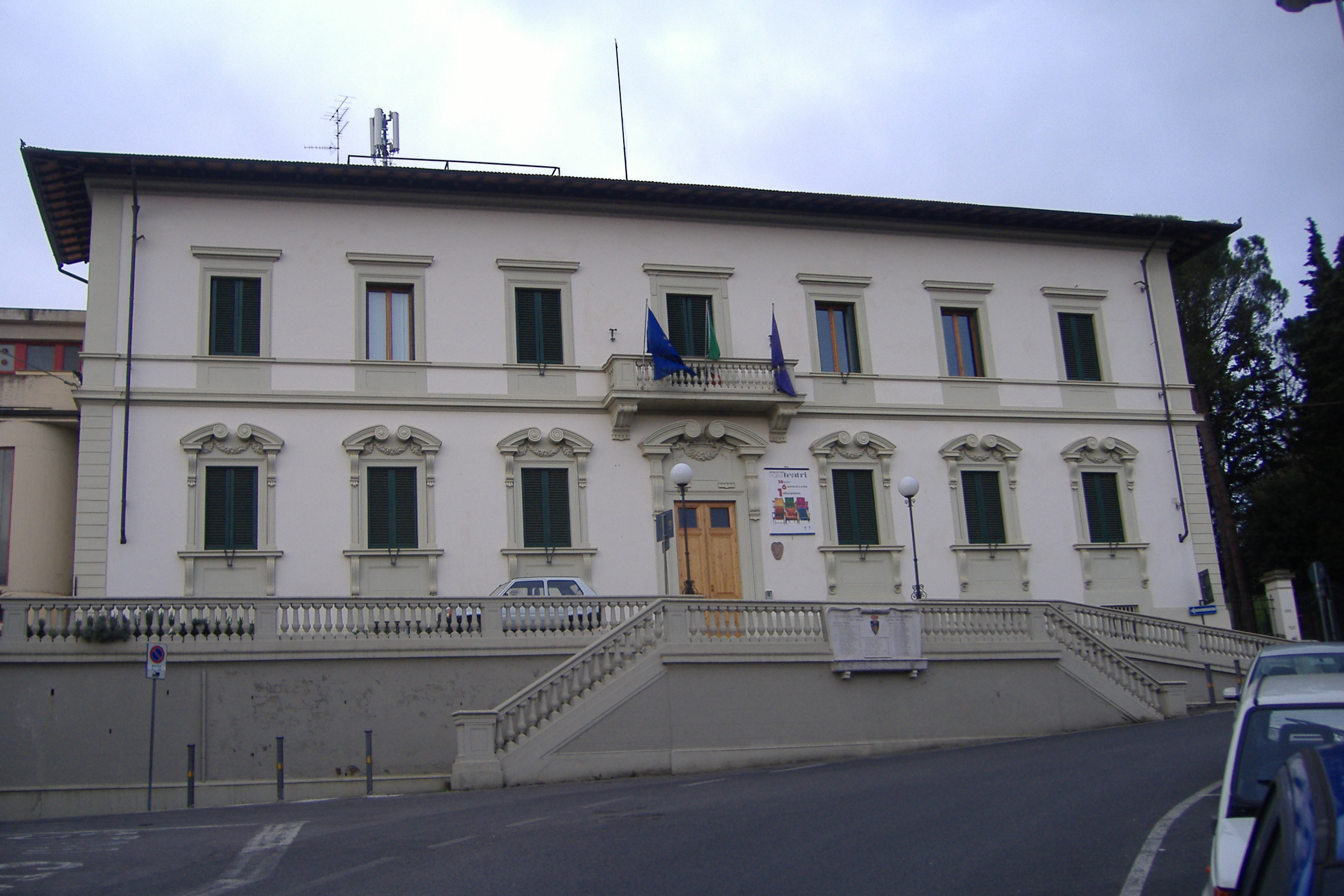

- Coat of arms

- Location within Italy Location within Tuscany
- Coordinates: 43°45′N 11°19′E
- Country: Italy
- Region: Tuscany
- Metropolitan city: Florence (FI)
- Frazioni: Antella, Candeli, le Gualchiere, Grassina, Lappeggi, Ponte a Ema, Osteria Nuova, Rimaggio, San Donato in Collina, Terzano, Vallina, Villamagna

Government
  - Mayor: Francesco Casini

Area
  - Total: 74.1 km^{2} (28.6 sq mi)
- Elevation: 75 m (246 ft)

Population (31 December 2014)
  - Total: 25,700
  - Density: 347/km^{2} (898/sq mi)
- Demonym: Bagnesi
- Time zone: UTC+1 (CET)
  - Summer (DST): UTC+2 (CEST)
- Postal code: 50012
- Dialing code: 055
- Patron saint: St. Peter and St. Paul
- Saint day: June 29
- Website: Official website

Bagno a Ripoli is a comune (municipality) in the Metropolitan City of Florence in the Italian region Tuscany, located about 7 kilometres (4 mi) southeast of Florence.

The International School of Florence has its primary school campus in the comune.

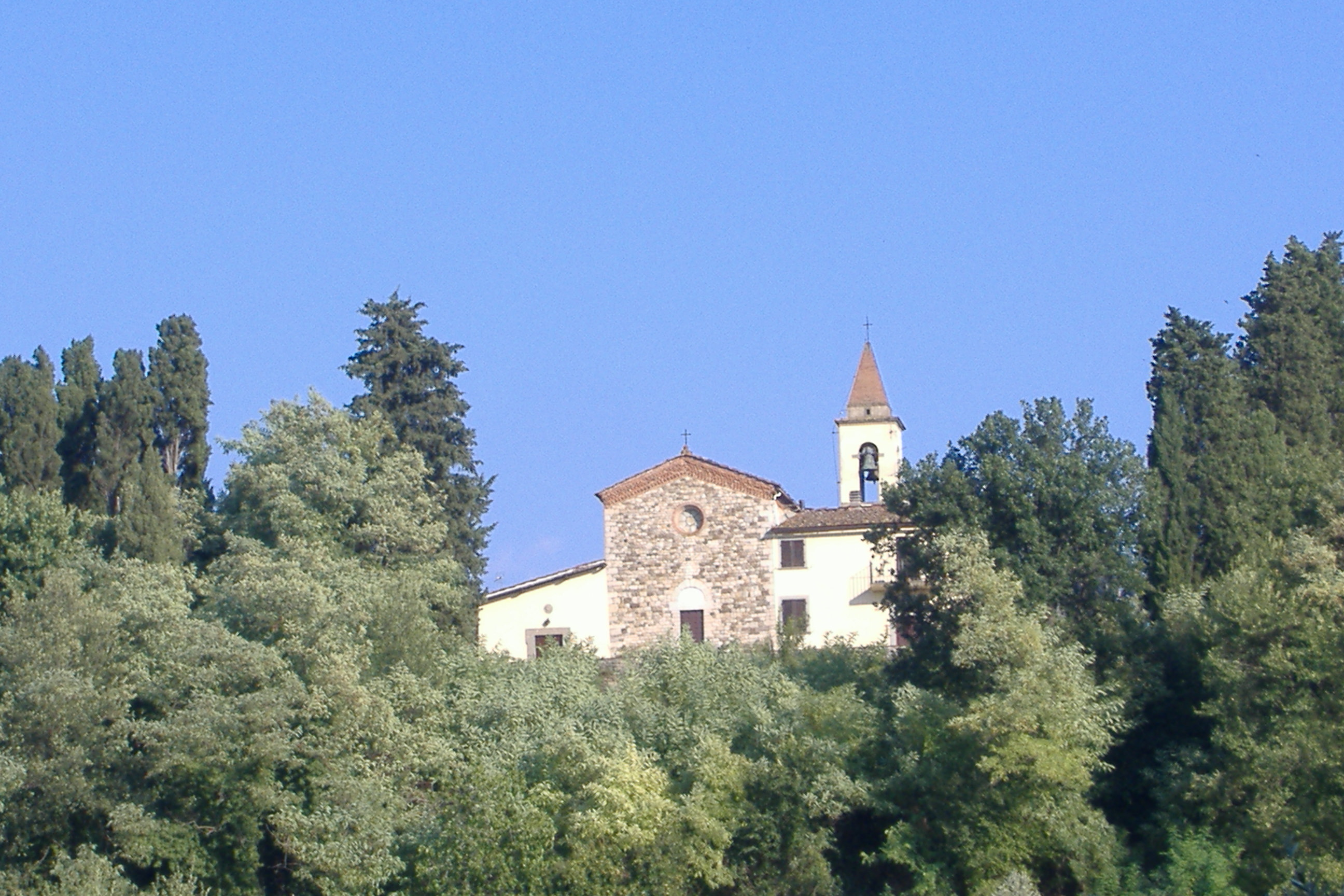
S. Tommaso in Baroncelli church

== See also ==
- Convento dell'Incontro
- Viola Park (Florence)
