= William Ozanne =

British Army general (1891–1966)

Major-General William Ozanne CB CBE MC
- Born: 15 September 1891; Guernsey, Channel Islands
- Died: 24 March 1966 (aged 74); Barton Mills, Suffolk, England
- Military career
- Allegiance: United Kingdom
- Branch: British Army
- Service years: 1911–1946
- Rank: Major-General
- Service number: 28
- Unit: Duke of Wellington's Regiment
- Commands: 1st Battalion, Duke of Wellington's Regiment; 55th Infantry Brigade; Norfolk County Division; 76th Infantry Division
- Conflicts: First World War; Second World War
- Awards: Companion of the Order of the Bath; Commander of the Order of the British Empire; Military Cross

Major-General William Maingay Ozanne, CB, CBE, MC (15 September 1891 − 24 March 1966) was a senior British Army officer.

== Military career ==
Educated at Elizabeth College, Guernsey, Ozanne later entered the Royal Military College, Sandhurst, from where he was commissioned as a second lieutenant into the Duke of Wellington's Regiment on 4 March 1911. Among his fellow graduates there were F. C. Roberts and P. H. Hansen, both of whom would later win the Victoria Cross (VC), and C. C. Malden, who would, like Ozanne, become a future general.

He served on the Western Front during the First World War.

He went on to become commanding officer of the 1st Battalion, the Duke of Wellington's Regiment in 1936 and the served in the Second World War as General Officer Commanding of the Norfolk County Division from December 1940, as General Officer Commanding 76th Infantry Division from November 1941 and then performed "special duties" in the War Office from December 1943. He retired from the army in 1946.

== Bibliography ==
- Smart, Nick (2005). Biographical Dictionary of British Generals of the Second World War. Barnesley: Pen & Sword. ISBN 1844150496.

Military offices
New command	GOC 76th Infantry Division; 1941−1943	Succeeded by Colin Callander
