= 180th Field Regiment, Royal Artillery =

8th Bn, North Staffordshire Regiment 180th Field Regiment, RA
- Cap badge of the Royal Artillery.
- Active: 1 March 1942–31 August 1944
- Country: United Kingdom
- Branch: British Army
- Type: Field artillery
- Size: 3–8 Batteries
- Part of: 48th (South Midland) Infantry Division

The 180th Field Regiment was a unit of the Royal Artillery, formed by the British Army during World War II. First raised in 1940 as infantry of the North Staffordshire Regiment, it was converted to the field artillery role in 1942, serving as a reserve unit in Home Defence. It was disbanded before the end of the war.

== 8th North Staffordshire Regiment ==
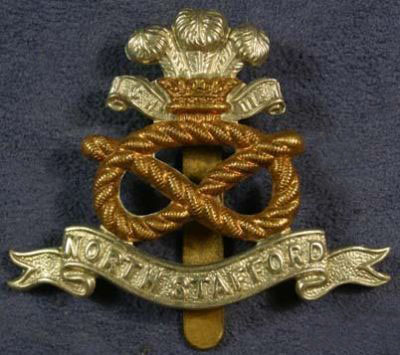
Cap badge of the North Staffordshire Regiment.

In July 1940, shortly after the British Expeditionary Force was evacuated from Dunkirk, the North Staffordshire Regiment formed a new 8th Battalion. (A previous 8th (Service) Battalion had been raised as part of Kitchener's Army during World War I of 1914–18.)

After initial training, the battalion joined a hone defence formation, 205th Independent Infantry Brigade (Home), when that was formed by No 5 Infantry Training Group on 10 October 1940. After briefly serving under 1st Infantry Division, the brigade was assigned to the North Midland Area command. It joined Lincolnshire County Division when that became operational on 27 March 1941. As the name implies, the division served in coast defence in Lincolnshire.

As the invasion threat receded, the 'County' divisions had served their purpose and most were disbanded in November 1941, many of their infantry battalions being converted to other roles. 8th North Staffordshires left 205 Bde on 29 November and was selected for conversion to a field regiment of the Royal Artillery.

== 180th Field Regiment, RA ==
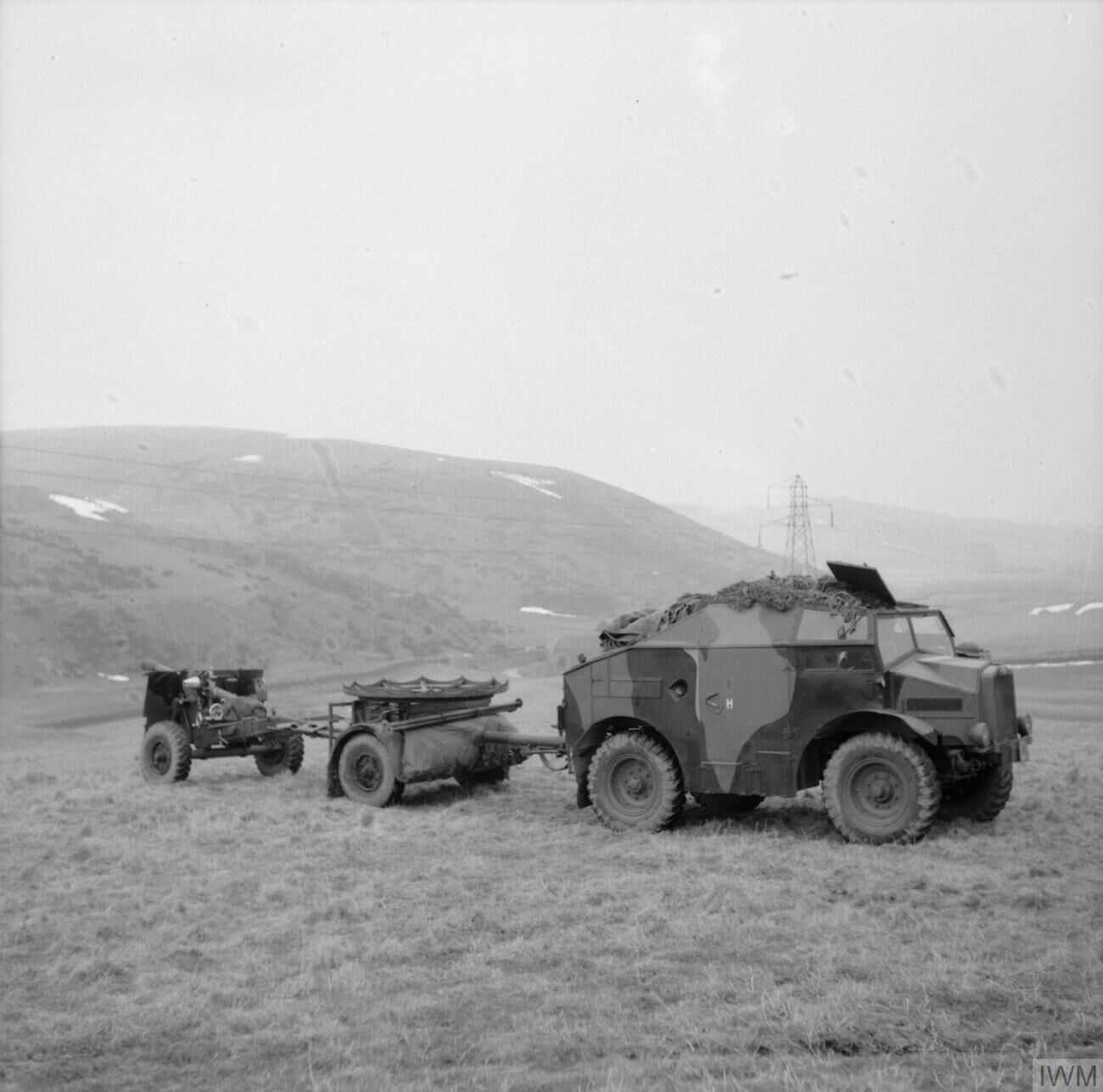
25-pounder gun and Morris C8 Quad tractor on exercises in the UK.

180th Field Regiment, RA, officially came into existence on 1 March 1942 with most of its personnel drawn from 8th North Staffords. It was organised with three batteries, Q, R and S, each to be equipped with eight Mk II 25-pounder guns. The batteries were redesignated P, Q and R on 11 March, and finally numbered as 174, 175 and 176 Field Btys on 1 January 1943.

For some months the regiment remained under War Office (WO) control, then at the beginning of December 1942 it was assigned to Northern Command. On 26 December the regiment joined 48th (South Midland) Division, which had just been designated a Reserve division under GHQ Home Forces.

48th (South Midland) Division's shoulder insignia.

As a reserve formation, 48th (SM) Division was not expected to serve overseas but to supply reinforcements to units and formations that were on or preparing for active service. 180th Field Rgt was using as a holding regiment: on 11 January 1943 it was joined by a number of additional batteries from disbanding regiments:

- 138 Fd Bty from 167th Fd Rgt of 76th (Reserve) Division
- 146 Fd Bty from 169th Fd Rgt
- 156, 157 and 158 Fd Btys from 173rd Fd Rgt of 48th (SM) Division

However, 173rd Fd Rgt was reformed in 76th (Reserve) Division on 20 July, and its original batteries returned to it, together with 138 Fd Bty.

After D Day in June 1944, the reserve formations in the UK supplied large reinforcement drafts to units of 21st Army Group, depleting their strength. On 31 August, 180th Fd Rgt and its three original batteries (174, 175, 176) were disbanded while 146 Fd Bty and the regiment's remaining personnel transferred to 120th (South Midland) Fd Rgt, which joined 48th (SM) Division the following day and served with it as a holding unit until the end of the war.
