= Lincolnshire County Division =

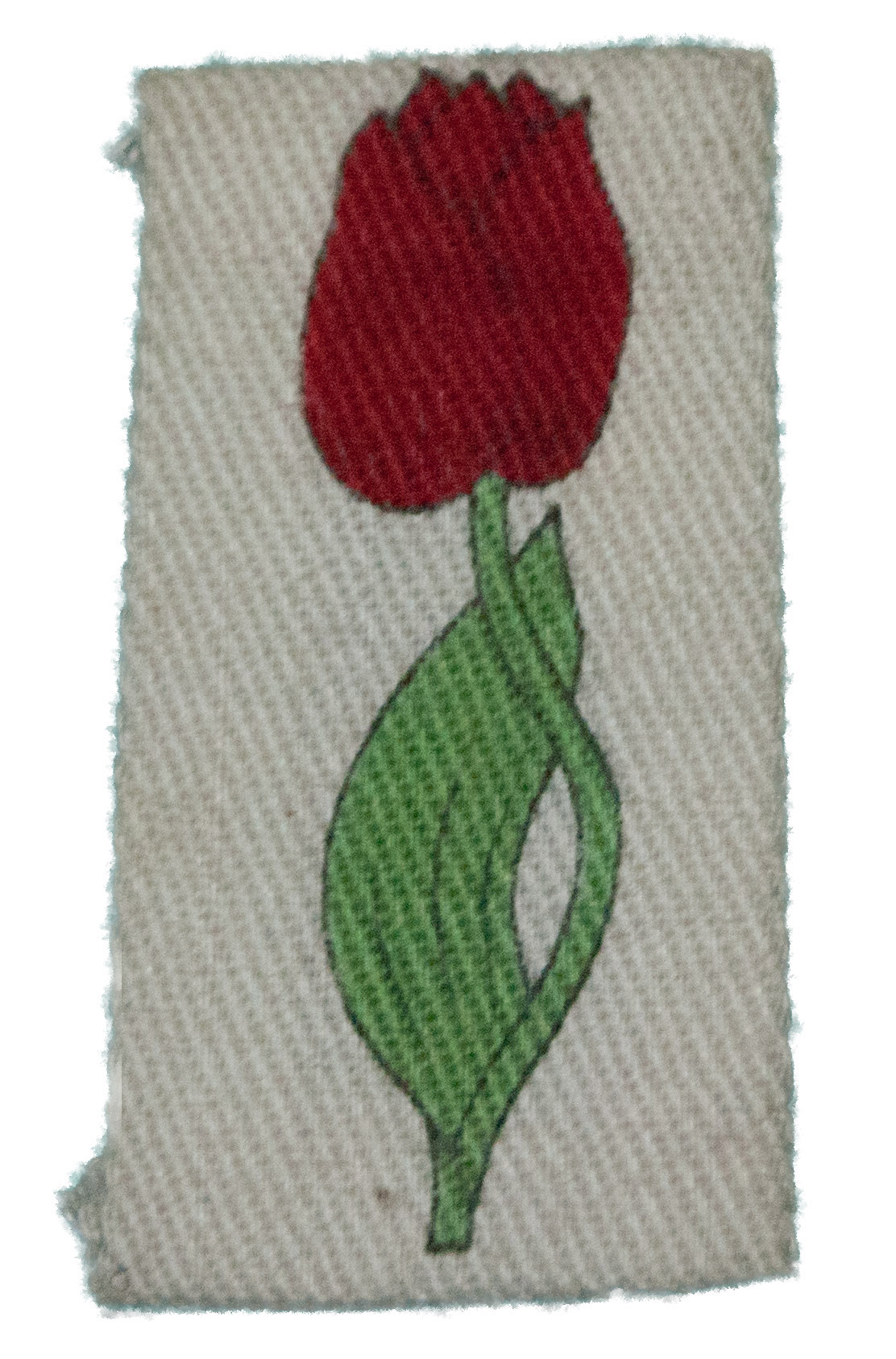
- Division insignia of the Lincolnshire County Division
- Active: 24 February 1941 – 3 December 1941
- Country: United Kingdom
- Branch: British Army
- Type: Static Division
- Role: Home Defence

The Lincolnshire County Division was a short-lived formation of the British Army, formed in the Second World War. The headquarters were formed on 24 February 1941, becoming operational on 27 March. It ceased to function on 25 November and was disbanded on 3 December. Its commanding officer was Major-General Arthur Kenneth Hay, and it was an infantry only formation consisting of three Independent Infantry Brigades (Home). Combat support, artillery, engineers etc., would be provided by other local formations. It was commanded by I Corps.

== Order of Battle ==
All brigades were part of the division from 27 March to late November 1941.

- 204th Independent Infantry Brigade (Home)
  - 6th Battalion, The King's Shropshire Light Infantry
  - 7th Battalion, The South Lancashire Regiment (left 31 May 1941)
  - 8th Battalion, The South Lancashire Regiment
  - 12th Battalion, The Sherwood Foresters (left 31 August 1941)

Redesignated the 204th Independent Infantry Brigade with its remaining battalions, on leaving the division.

- 205th Independent Infantry Brigade (Home)
  - 7th Battalion, Royal Norfolk Regiment (left 5 November 1941)
  - 7th Battalion, Lincolnshire Regiment
  - 7th Battalion, The Leicestershire Regiment
  - 8th Battalion, The North Staffordshire Regiment

The remaining battalions left the brigade on, or shortly after the brigade left the division, the brigade headquarters was converted into the 36th Army Tank Brigade shortly after that.

- 212th Independent Infantry Brigade (Home)
  - 6th Battalion, The South Wales Borderers
  - 9th Battalion, The Royal Sussex Regiment
  - 10th Battalion, The Gloucestershire Regiment
  - 18th Battalion, The Welch Regiment (left 28 May 1941)

Redesignated the 212th Independent Infantry Brigade with its remaining battalions and joined the 54th (East Anglian) Infantry Division.

== See also ==
- List of British divisions in World War II

== Bibliography ==
- Cole, Howard (1973). Formation Badges of World War 2 Britain, Commonwealth and Empire. London: Arms and Armour Press.
- Joslen, Lt-Col H.F. (1990) [1st. Pub. HMSO:1960]. Orders of Battle, Second World War, 1939–1945. London: London Stamp Exchange. ISBN 0-948130-03-2.
