= 154th Regiment Royal Armoured Corps =

Military unit

The 154th Regiment Royal Armoured Corps (154 RAC) was a short-lived armoured regiment of the British Army raised by the Royal Armoured Corps during World War II. The regiment was formed in 1942 by the conversion of the 9th Battalion, North Staffordshire Regiment into an armoured role. However, it was disbanded before it saw active service abroad.

== Origin ==
The regiment was formed in late 1941 by the conversion to the armoured role of the 9th Battalion, North Staffordshire Regiment. The 9th North Staffords was a hostilities-only infantry battalion raised in 1940 that had been serving with the 224th Independent Infantry Brigade (Home). In common with all other infantry battalions that were transferred to the Royal Armoured Corps, personnel of 154th RAC would still have continued to wear their North Staffords cap badge on the black beret of the Royal Armoured Corps. Personnel unsuited to fighting in tanks were weeded out by psychiatrists and sent to other units.

== Service ==
On 1 January 1942, 154th RAC was assigned to the 36th Army Tank Brigade (previously the 205th Independent Infantry Brigade (Home)) alongside the 156 RAC and 157 RAC, which had both also been converted from infantry battalions. On 8 December 1942, the brigade was redesignated 36th Tank Brigade. However, the regiment was disbanded on 3 July 1943, without it ever having seen active service and the brigade itself was disbanded later in the month. The personnel of the regiment were sent to other Royal Armoured Corps units.
