= Norfolk County Division =

- Active: 24 December 1940 - 18 November 1941
- Country: United Kingdom
- Branch: British Army
- Type: Static Division

The Norfolk County Division was short lived of the British Army formed during the Second World War. It was formed on 24 December 1940, and disbanded on 18 November 1941 by being redesignated as the 76th Infantry Division. It was commanded by Major-General W.H. Ozanne, and it was an infantry only formation consisting of three Independent Infantry Brigades (Home). Combat support, artillery, engineers etc., would be provided by other local formations.

It was under command of II Corps for its existence.

== Order of Battle ==
All brigades were part of the division from 12 December 1940 to 17 November 1941.

213th Independent Infantry Brigade (Home)

- 13th Battalion, Royal Warwickshire Regiment
- 9th Battalion, Royal Berkshire Regiment
- 14th Battalion, South Staffordshire Regiment

Redesignated as the 213th Infantry Brigade on leaving the division.

220th Independent Infantry Brigade (Home)

- 23rd Battalion, Royal Fusiliers (left 5 July 1941)
- 7th Battalion, Royal Norfolk Regiment
- 9th Battalion, Royal Norfolk Regiment
- 9th Battalion, Bedfordshire and Hertfordshire Regiment

Redesignated as the 220th Infantry Brigade on leaving the division.

222nd Independent Infantry Brigade (Home)

- 8th Battalion, Lincolnshire Regiment
- 8th Battalion, Leicestershire Regiment
- 11th Battalion, Royal Scots Fusiliers

Redesignated as the 222nd Infantry Brigade on leaving the division.

== See also ==
- List of British divisions in World War II

== Bibliography ==
- Joslen, Lt-Col H.F. (1990) [1st. Pub. HMSO:1960]. Orders of Battle, Second World War, 1939–1945. London: London Stamp Exchange. ISBN 0-948130-03-2.
