= Euston Baker =

British Army officer (1895–1981)

Brigadier Euston Baker CB CBE DSO MC* TD DL JP
- Born: 5 April 1895; Fulham, London, England
- Died: 17 January 1981 (aged 85)
- Military career
- Allegiance: United Kingdom
- Branch: British Army
- Service years: 1914–1945
- Rank: Brigadier
- Service number: 23973
- Units: Middlesex Regiment; London Regiment
- Commands: 2nd Battalion, Middlesex Regiment; 8th Battalion, Middlesex Regiment; 7th (City of London) Battalion, London Regiment; 35th Infantry Brigade; 213th Independent Infantry Brigade
- Conflicts: World War I World War II
- Awards: Companion of the Order of the Bath; Commander of the Order of the British Empire; Distinguished Service Order; Military Cross and Bar; Efficiency Decoration; Mentioned in despatches (3)

Brigadier Euston Edward Francis Baker CB CBE DSO MC* TD DL JP (5 April 1895 – 17 January 1981) was a British Army officer of both world wars.

== Military career ==
Baker was born in Fulham, London. He commissioned into the 5th Battalion, Middlesex Regiment on 15 August 1914 and saw active service in the First World War. During the war he was mentioned in dispatches three times, and was awarded the Military Cross in September 1917. The medal's citation reads:

For conspicuous gallantry and devotion to duty. He went forward in a most fearless manner under very heavy shell fire, and assisted companies who had lost all their officers to reorganise and consolidate the ground they had captured. Later, during a further advance, he took command of his battalion and inspired all ranks with the greatest confidence, setting an example of coolness and courage throughout a very trying period.

He was later added a bar to his MC in July 1918. The citation for the bar reads:

For conspicuous gallantry and devotion to duty after assuming command of his battalion. Throughout the operations he did yeoman service in maintaining the efficiency and fighting spirit of the battalion and in covering the withdrawal of other troops. He showed great coolness and efficiency in handling his men.

In February 1919 he was awarded the Distinguished Service Order for his actions in the Battle of the Scarpe (1918). The DSO's citation reads:

For conspicuous gallantry and able leadership. In particular, in the successful attacks on the Fresnes-Rouvroy line on October 7th and Drocourt-Queant line on .October 11th, 1918, resulting in the capture of many prisoners and much material, his resourcefulness and gallantry under fire were most marked. He personally exploited successes, and by his grasp of the situation in the afternoon was instrumental in seizing a most important tactical point which was holding up the corps on the right.

In February 1923 Baker was promoted to lieutenant colonel and took command of the 8th Battalion, Middlesex Regiment. In 1931 he became Commanding Officer of the 7th Battalion, City of London Regiment, before retaking command of the 8th Battalion, Middlesex Regiment from 1936 to 1937. He was made a Commander of the Order of the British Empire on 23 June 1936 and in 1938 became a Deputy lieutenant for Middlesex. Following the outbreak of the Second World War he became Commanding Officer of the 35th Infantry Brigade, serving in the position until April 1940. From October 1940 to July 1942 Baker was commander of the 213th Independent Infantry Brigade. He retired from the regular army due to ill health in March 1945 with the rank of brigadier.

Between June 1941 and June 1951, Baker was an additional aide-de-camp to George VI, and was Honorary Colonel of the 5th Battalion, Middlesex Regiment from 1942 to 1963. In October 1947 Baker became Honorary Colonel of 11th Parachute Battalion (Middlesex). He was made a Companion of the Order of the Bath in 1957.
