= 103rd Anti-Tank Regiment, Royal Artillery =

14th Battalion, South Staffordshire Regiment 103rd Anti-Tank Regiment, RA
- Cap badge of the Royal Artillery
- Active: 4 July 1940–10 August 1943
- Country: United Kingdom
- Branch: British Army
- Role: Infantry; Anti-Tank artillery
- Size: Battalion; Regiment
- Mottos: RA mottoes: Quo Fas Et Gloria Ducunt ("Where Right And Glory Lead"; in Latin fas implies "sacred duty"); Ubique (Everywhere)

The 103rd Anti-Tank Regiment, Royal Artillery (103rd A/T Rgt) was a short-lived unit of the British Army during World War II. Initially raised as an infantry battalion of the South Staffordshire Regiment in 1940, it was transferred to the Royal Artillery in late 1942 after serving for two years defending the coast of Norfolk. During 1943, it was broken up to provide independent air-landing batteries for 6th Airborne Division.

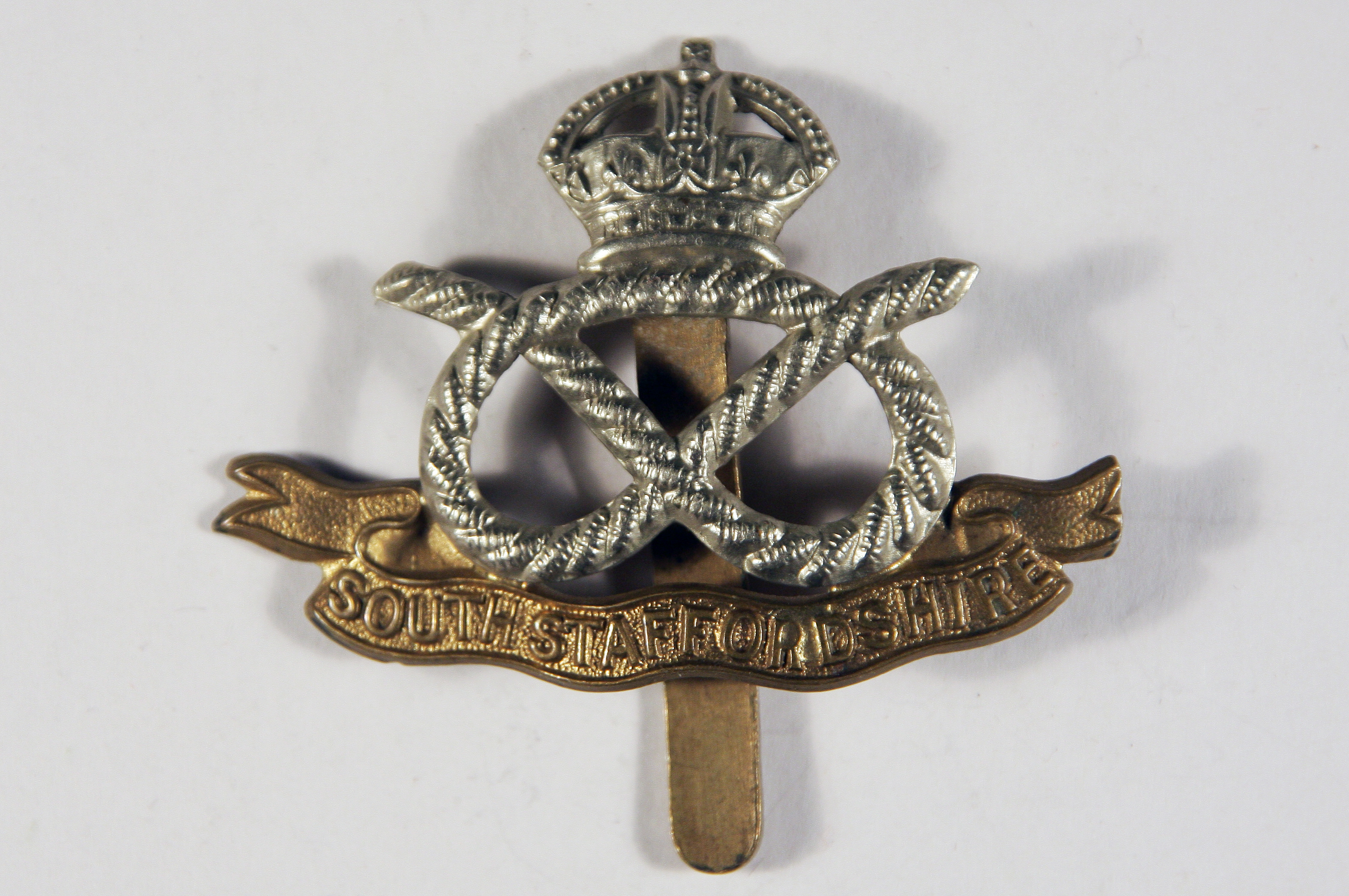
The South Staffordshires' cap badge.

== 14th Battalion, South Staffordshires ==
The unit was originally formed on 4 July 1940 at Lichfield as 14th Battalion, South Staffordshire Regiment. On 30 September, it joined 213th Independent Infantry Brigade (Home), which was being organised by No 13 Infantry Training Group as a static defence formation in East Anglia, first under II Corps and then 18th Infantry Division. It was charged with defending the Norfolk coast against invasion. The brigade became part of Norfolk County Division when that formation became operational in II Corps on 24 December 1940. Norfolk County Division was redesignated 76th Infantry Division on 17 November 1941, but it remained a second-line (lower establishment) formation.

== 103rd Anti-Tank Regiment ==
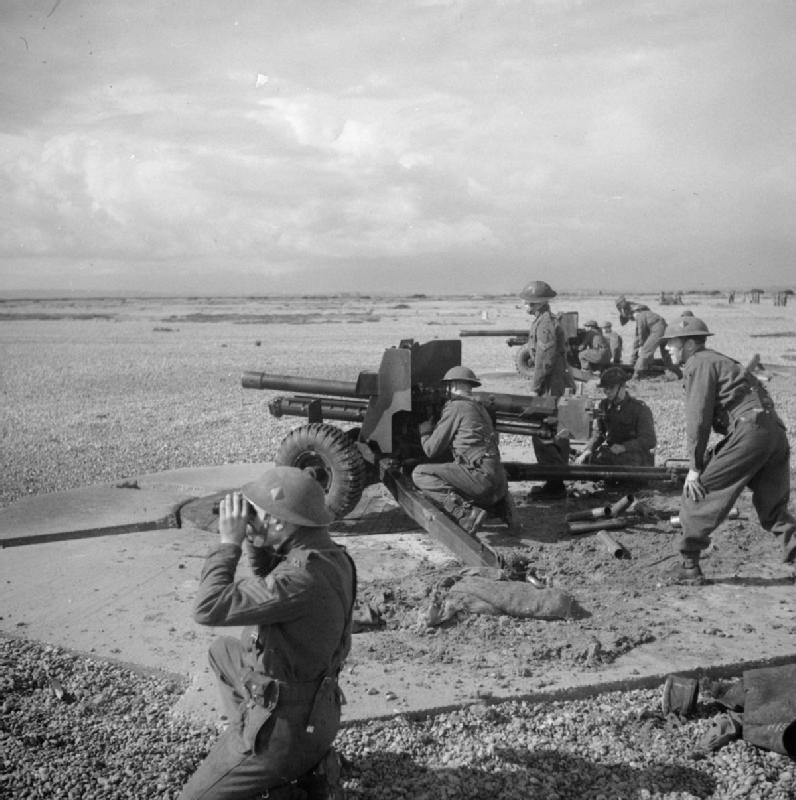
6-pounder A/T gun being fired on a practice range in the UK.

At the end of 1942, 14th South Staffords was selected to be retrained in the anti-tank (A/T) role. It left 213th Bde on 8 December and on 22 December 1942 it was transferred to the Royal Artillery (RA) as 103rd Anti-Tank Regiment, Royal Artillery, comprising Regimental Headquarters (RHQ) and 189, 190 and 191 A/T Batteries. By this stage of the war, the standard armament of an A/T unit was the 6-pounder gun, but the 17-pounder had just started to appear.

103rd A/T Regiment was first assigned to the GHQ Reserve then, in February 1943, it was transferred to Western Command, in which it served as an independent regiment with its own Light Aid Detachment of the Royal Electrical and Mechanical Engineers.

=== Disbandment ===
Between 1 and 9 July 1943, at Marlborough Barracks, Bulford Camp, 189 and 190 A/T Btys were converted into 3 and 4 Airlanding A/T Btys respectively, while 191 Bty was broken up to make up deficiencies among the other two. RHQ was then due to disband on 30 July, and this was actually carried out on 10 August 1943.

3 and 4 Airlanding A/T Btys joined 6th Airborne Division on 9 July 1943 and served with it in the Normandy campaign as independent batteries. A new 2nd Airlanding Anti-Tank Regiment was formed in February 1945 to command these batteries for the Rhine crossing (Operation Varsity).
