= 47th (London) Infantry Division =

2nd London Division 47th (London) Infantry Division 47th Infantry (Reserve) Division
- Formation sign of the 47th (London) Infantry Division
- Active: 1939–1946
- Branch: Territorial Army
- Type: Motorised infantry Infantry
- Role: Motorised infantry, home defence, and training
- Size: War establishment strength: 10,136–18,347 men (Note: This is the war establishment, the on-paper strength. The war establishment of a motor division was 10,136 men; for an infantry division during 1939–1941, it was 13,863 men; following 1941, it was increased to 17,298 men; for the final two years of the war, the war establishment was 18,347 men. For further information on how division sizes changed during the war, see British Army during the Second World War.)

Commanders
- Notable commanders: Sir Gerald Templer

The 47th (London) Infantry Division was an infantry division of the British Army that was formed during the Second World War and remained in the United Kingdom until the end of the war. In March 1939, after the re-emergence of Germany as a significant military power and its occupation of Czechoslovakia, the British Army increased the number of divisions in the Territorial Army (TA) by duplicating existing units. The 2nd London Division was formed in August 1939 as a second-line duplicate of the 1st London Division; its battalions were all initially London-based.

The division was established as a motor division and was fully mobile, with two infantry brigades rather than the usual three for an infantry division. The intention was to increase battlefield mobility, enabling the motor divisions to follow armoured forces through breaches in the opposing front line rapidly to consolidate captured territory. Following the Battle of France, the motor division concept was abandoned. The division was then allocated a third infantry brigade, becoming an infantry division. In November 1940, it was renamed the 47th (London) Infantry Division.

The division was to remain in the United Kingdom to complete training before being deployed to France within twelve months of the war breaking out. Instead, after Dunkirk the division was dispersed to protect strategically important locations and undertake anti-invasion duties and was moved to Wales to defend the country from invasion. In early 1941, it was transferred to the southern English coast on anti-invasion duties. During this period, the division developed training methods that were disseminated throughout the British Army within the United Kingdom. In 1944, parts of the division assisted in Operation Bodyguard, the deception efforts in support of Operation Overlord, as well as providing administrative services during the build-up to invasion. Manpower in the division was slowly reduced as it reinforced combat formations within the 21st Army Group. The division was disbanded in August 1944.

In September 1944, the division was reformed as the 47th Infantry (Reserve) Division, which was composed of personnel from the disbanded 76th Infantry (Reserve) Division. The division, now a training formation, was made responsible for providing final tactical and field training once soldiers had passed their initial training. After five additional weeks of training, the soldiers would be posted to fighting formations overseas. The 47th Infantry (Reserve) Division was disbanded as part of the demobilisation of the British Armed Forces after the Second World War, in 1946 and was not reformed when the TA was reconstituted in 1947.

== Background ==
Throughout the 1930s, tensions built between Germany and the United Kingdom and its allies. During late 1937 and 1938, German demands for the annexation of the Sudetenland in Czechoslovakia led to an international crisis. To avoid war, the British Prime Minister Neville Chamberlain met with the German Chancellor Adolf Hitler in September 1938 and signed the Munich Agreement, which accepted that Germany would annexe the Sudetenland. Chamberlain had intended the agreement to lead to a further peaceful resolution of differences but relations between the countries soon deteriorated. On 15 March 1939, Germany breached the terms of the agreement by invading and occupying the remnants of Czechoslovakia.

On 29 March, the British Secretary of State for War, Leslie Hore-Belisha, announced plans to increase the strength of the part-time Territorial Army (TA) from 130,000 men to 340,000, doubling the number of divisions. (Note: The TA was a reserve of the British regular army made up of part-time volunteers. By 1939, its intended role was to be the sole method of expanding the size of the British armed forces (comparable to the creation of Kitchener's Army during the First World War). First-line territorial formations would create a second-line division using a cadre of trained personal and if needed, a third division would also be created. All TA recruits were required to take the general service obligation meaning that territorial soldiers could be sent overseas. (This avoided the complications experienced with the First World War Territorial Force, whose members had to volunteer for overseas service.)) The plan was for existing TA divisions, referred to as the first-line, to recruit over their establishments. This would be accomplished by an increase in pay for territorials, the removal of restrictions on promotion that had hindered recruiting, the construction of better-quality barracks, and an increase in supper rations. The units would then form a new division that was referred to as the second-line from cadres. This process was dubbed "duplicating". The 2nd London Division was to be created as a second-line formation, a duplicate of the first-line 1st London Division. Despite the intention for the army to grow, the programme was complicated by a lack of central guidance on the expansion and duplication process, and issues regarding the lack of facilities, equipment and instructors. It had been envisioned by the War Office that the duplicating process and recruiting the required number of men would take no more than six months. In April, limited conscription was introduced; at that time 34,500 men, all aged 20, were conscripted into the regular army, initially to undergo six months of training before being deployed to the forming second-line units. The process varied widely between the TA divisions; some were ready in weeks while others had made little progress by early September 1939, when war on Germany was declared.

== History ==
=== Formation ===
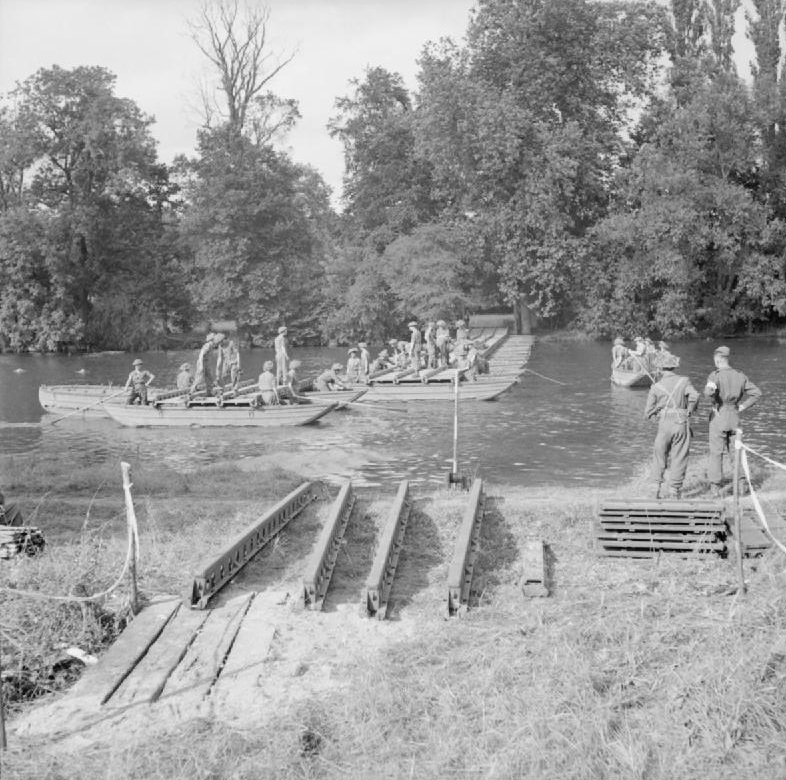
Men of the division construct a pontoon bridge over the River Thames.

Due to a lack of official guidance, newly formed units were at liberty to choose numbers, styles, and titles. The 1st London Division created the 4th London Infantry Brigade as a second-line duplicate of the 1st London Infantry Brigade, and the 5th London Infantry Brigade as a second-line duplicate of the 2nd London Infantry Brigade. These newly formed brigades were assigned to the 2nd London Division, which became active on 24 August 1939 and was assigned to Eastern Command. Command of the 2nd London was given to Major-General Harry Willans, who had previously commanded the 2nd London Infantry Brigade. On formation, the 4th London Brigade consisted of the 11th and 12th Battalions, Royal Fusiliers, and the 2nd Battalion, London Irish Rifles (Royal Ulster Rifles). The 5th London Brigade was made up of the 2nd Battalion, Queen's Westminsters (King's Royal Rifle Corps), the 2nd Battalion, London Scottish (Gordon Highlanders), and the 2nd Battalion, London Rifle Brigade (Rifle Brigade). To denote the division's association with London, the formation insignia represented the bells of St Mary-le-Bow church.

The division was formed as a motor division, one of five such divisions in the British Army. (Note: The other four being the 1st London, 50th (Northumbrian), 55th (West Lancashire), and the 59th (Staffordshire) divisions.) British military doctrine development during the inter-war period resulted in three types of division by the end of the 1930s; the infantry division, the mobile division (later called the armoured division), and the motor division. Historian David French wrote, "the main role of the infantry ... was to break into the enemy's defensive position". This would then be exploited by the mobile division, followed by the motor divisions that would "carry out the rapid consolidation of the ground captured by the mobile divisions", therefore "transform[ing] the 'break-in' into a 'break-through'." According to French, the motor division "matched that of the German army's motorized and light divisions. But there the similarities ended." The German motorised divisions contained three brigades and were as fully equipped as a regular infantry division; while their smaller, light divisions contained a tank battalion. The British motor division was fully motorised and capable of transporting all of their infantry. However, it was "otherwise much weaker than normal infantry divisions", or their German counterparts. This was due to it being made-up of only two brigades instead of three, having two artillery regiments as opposed to an infantry division's three, and due it having no tanks.

=== Home defence ===
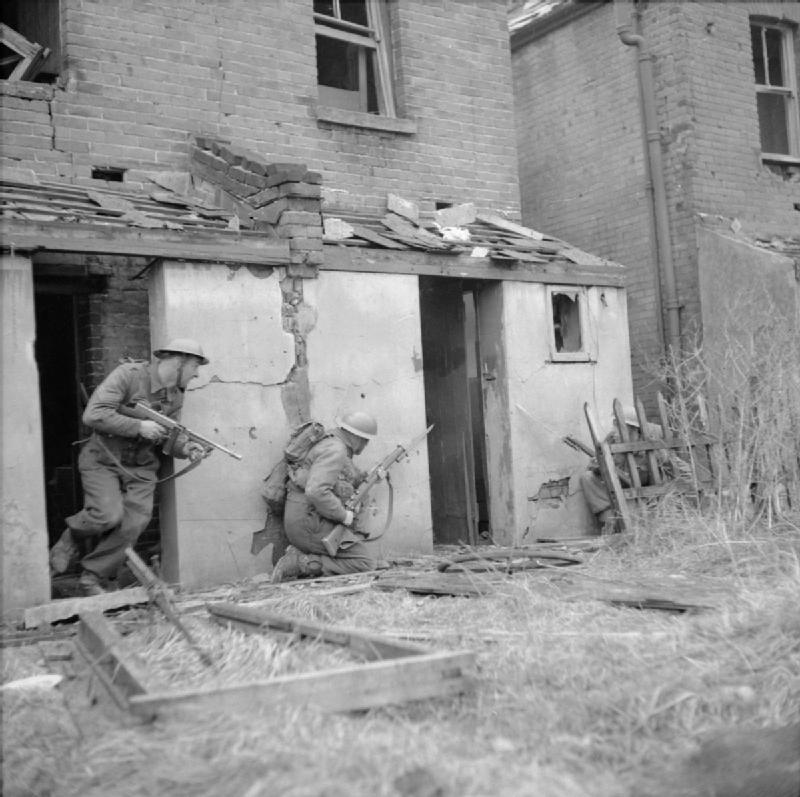
Soldiers at the division's battle school; bomb-damaged houses are being used to provide a realistic training environment for fighting in built-up areas.

It was planned that the TA divisions would be deployed intact to reinforce the British Expeditionary Force (BEF) in France as equipment became available, and that all 26 TA divisions would be deployed by the end of the first year of the war. Instead, the division was dispersed around London to protect strategically important locations, known as vulnerable points, including the London Docks. C. Northcote Parkinson, author of the Royal Fusiliers history of the Second World War, wrote that the 11th Battalion fired "some of the first shots of the war", a "hair-triggered" reaction to intruders near the Waltham Abbey explosives factory, which it was assigned to guard. At the end of the year, the division moved to Hertfordshire to conduct training exercises. In May 1940, the majority of the division's men were relocated to Cambridgeshire, leaving two battalions to defend London. In Cambridgeshire, the division was made Eastern Command's reserve formation, which was to be used as a counterattack force against any German airborne landings. Commander-in-Chief of Home Forces, General Walter Kirke, believing the East of England was under threat of invasion as a result of the German operations in mainland Europe, transferred several divisions to defend the coast. Part of this effort involved temporarily splitting the division into two brigade groups. One moved to the Suffolk coastline, to supplement the 55th (West Lancashire) Motor Division on the east coast. The other remained in Cambridgeshire, with troops assigned to varying duties that included the protection of vulnerable points, construction of defensive positions, and defending Royal Air Force (RAF) airfields. On paper, an infantry division was to have seventy-two 25-pounder field guns. On 31 May, the division had eight-such modern guns, four First World War-vintage 18-pounder field guns, and eight 4.5 in (110 mm) howitzers of similar vintage. The division lacked the motor vehicles it needed to fulfil its motor division role and had to rely heavily on commandeered civilian transport.

As a result of the German victory in the Battle of France and the return of the BEF following the Dunkirk evacuation, the division was not deployed overseas per the original TA deployment timeline. As soon as the Battle of France ended, the British Army began implementing lessons learnt from the campaign; this included basing the standard division around three brigades and the abandonment of the motor-division concept. This process involved the break-up of four second-line territorial divisions to reinforce depleted formations and helping change the Army's five motor divisions – each of which consisted of two brigades – into infantry divisions made up of three brigades. As part of this process, the 12th (Eastern) Infantry Division was disbanded and its units were dispersed to other divisions to bring them up to strength. The 114th Field Regiment, Royal Artillery and the remnants of the 36th Infantry Brigade were assigned to the 2nd London Division at this time. The 36th Infantry Brigade was being reformed after suffering heavy casualties during the Battle of France; it was removed and assigned to III Corps shortly afterwards. The 25th Infantry Brigade, which had been part of the BEF's line-of-communication forces and then attached to a string of divisions during the fighting in France, was permanently assigned to the division on 25 June. A newly raised Royal Engineer field company, the 222nd, also became part of the division. With the addition of a permanent third brigade, and the additional artillery and engineer units, the 2nd London Division became an infantry division.

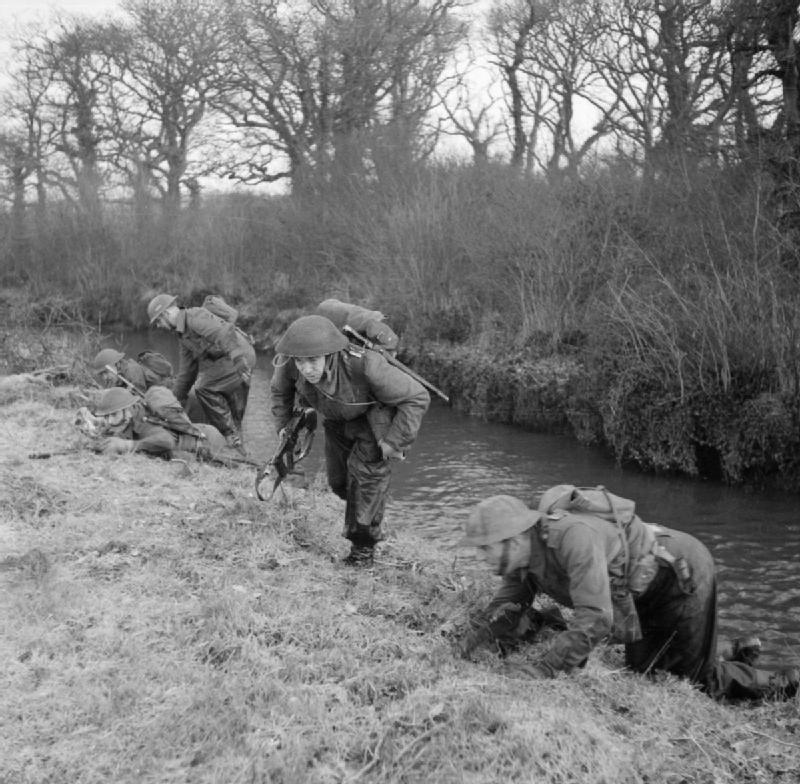
Infantry training at the 47th Division School of Battle Drill at Lymington near Southampton, Hampshire, 11 March 1942.

In late June 1940, the 2nd London Division was assigned to Western Command. It then moved to South Wales to relieve the 38th (Welsh) Infantry Division, which moved east across the country. A. T. M. Durand and R. H. W. S. Hastings, authors of the London Rifle Brigade's history of the war, wrote that while it was improbable Germany would invade Great Britain via Wales, "the last foreign troops to land with hostile intent in the British Isles came ashore at Fishguard during the Napoleonic War". After the move to Wales, some of the division's battalions were relocated to other parts of the United Kingdom. For example, the 11th Royal Fusiliers moved to Worcestershire after a brief deployment to South Wales. Others, such as the London Scottish, did not move with the division but moved to Staffordshire, where it provided guards for airfields and vulnerable points. On 21 November 1940, the 2nd London was redesignated the 47th (London) Infantry Division. (Note: In being renumbered, the division took over the designation of the former 47th (2nd London) Division, which was formed as the first-line 2nd London Division following the Haldane Reforms in 1908. It was renumbered the 47th, and fought during the First World War. In 1936, the majority of the division was merged with the 56th (London) to create the London Division. The Royal Army Service Corps element of both the 47th and 56th were used to form the 1st Anti-Aircraft Division.) During this period, two of the original battalions left the division because rifle units were selected to provide the motorised infantry support of armoured formations. (Note: The 2nd London Rifle Brigade was transferred to the 29th Armoured Brigade and the 2nd Queen's Westminster were transferred to the 30th Armoured Brigade.) This move, according to author Cyril Barclay, "emasculated the Division" and it was brought up to strength with former "pioneer and local defence battalions", which were "renamed, with small geographical or transitional justification". Following this, Willans was promoted to the War Office and was replaced as GOC on 8 December 1940 by Major-General Clifford Malden, who was previously Director of Military Training.

In February 1941, the 47th Division was assigned to IV Corps and was deployed to West Sussex on the south coast of England for coastal defence duties. Malden arrived at Shoreham-by-Sea on 25 March 1941 to review the progress of the beach defences. While touring the defences, Malden inadvertently walked into a minefield that had been laid and was killed after setting off a mine. On 18 April 1941, Major-General John Utterson-Kelso became GOC. Utterson-Kelso's prior experience included commanding the 131st Infantry Brigade during the Battle of France, and a brief stint as acting commander of the 44th (Home Counties) Infantry Division. In July, under Utterson-Kelso's direction, the division established the first 'Battle School' in the United Kingdom. The school was a two-week training course, which included observing and practising fieldcraft, undertaking tactical exercises without troops, and engaging in battle drill in realistic conditions. French wrote, "Its purpose was to offer soldiers some experience of the noise and chaos of battle by giving them the opportunity to train under live-firing conditions". (Note: An example of how the battle school aided the division can be provided by the 11th Royal Fusiliers, which initially submitted all platoon commanders and sergeants to complete the course. After the battalion was relieved of its coastal defence duties, the platoon commanders disseminated the knowledge of the battle school through intensive fieldcraft and tactical training.) The success of the school was shown by the adoption of the idea and all divisions were ordered to form one. In November 1941, the division was assigned to V Corps and that December it was placed on the lower establishment. During the war, divisions of the British Army were classified as either higher establishment formations that were intended for deployment overseas and combat, or lower establishment ones that were detailed strictly for home defence in a static role.

On 10 April 1942, Major-General Gerald Templer replaced Utterson-Kelso as GOC. Templer had served in the BEF in France before being given command of a battalion on return to the United Kingdom, then a brigade. Following his appointment, Templer arranged a demonstration of the effects of fighter-aircraft strafing of ground targets but a pilot error led to 27 spectators being killed and 80 more – including Templer – were wounded in the Imber friendly fire incident. By May 1942, the division was based in Hampshire and tasked with countering any potential raids along the coast conducted by the German forces. In June, the division was placed under the command of the Hampshire and Dorset District and remained under this command until January 1944. On 14 September 1942, following Templer's promotion, Major-General Alfred Eryk Robinson became GOC of the division. Robinson had commanded the 1st Battalion, Green Howards during the Norwegian campaign, before being given command of an infantry brigade on his return to England. The division remained in the south until January 1944, when it was assigned to Northern Command, before being switched to Southern Command in March. It reverted to Northern Command in July. Some of these moves, as well as notional ones, were deliberately leaked through double agents as part of Operation Fortitude. Between April and October 1944, the 141st Brigade was made responsible for an embarkation sector in the Southampton area; an administrative and organisational role in support of Operation Overlord facilitating the movement of troops from their camps to ships to be deployed to France.

=== Wind down, training division, and disbandment ===
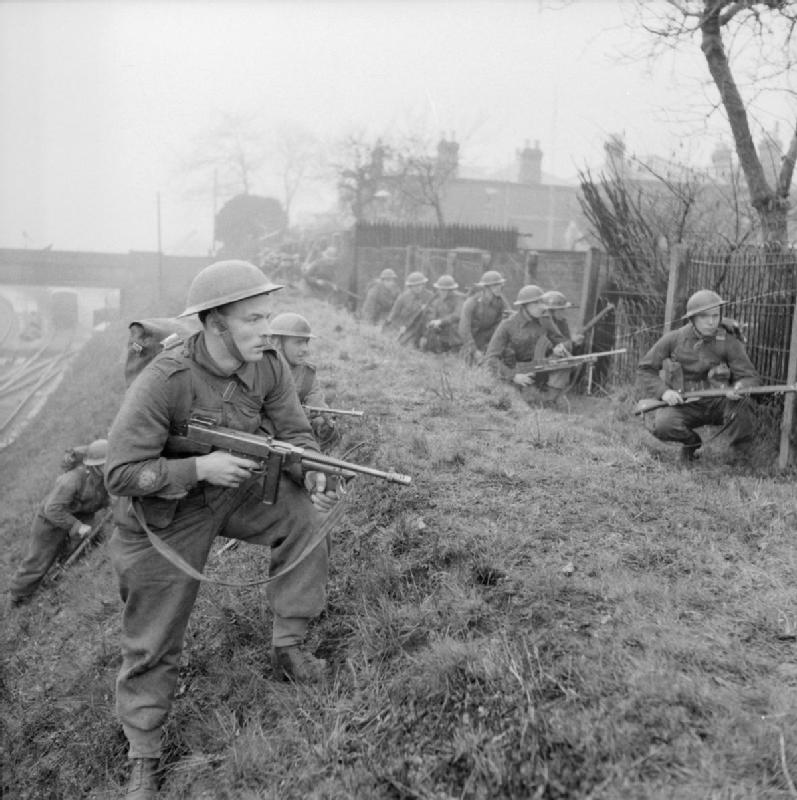
Infantry training at the division's battle school. The troops are seen advancing between the backs of houses along a railway line.

By mid-1944, the five lower establishment divisions allocated to home-defence duties – the 38th (Welsh), the 45th, the 47th (London), the 55th (West Lancashire), and the 61st – had a combined strength of 17,845 men. Of this number, around 13,000 were available as replacements for the 21st Army Group fighting in France. (Note: The war establishment – the paper strength – of a higher establishment infantry division by this point in the war was 18,347 men.) The remaining 4,800 men were considered ineligible for service abroad for a variety of reasons, including a lack of training or being medically unfit. Over the following six months, up to 75 per cent of these men would be deployed to reinforce the 21st Army Group following the completion of their training and certification of fitness. On 15 August, what was left of the division was dispersed; this process took until the end of the month, when the division and its brigades were disbanded.

During 1944, the British Army suffered a severe shortage of manpower. In an effort to downsize the army and consolidate as many men within as few formations as possible to maintain efficiency, the War Office began disbanding divisions and restructuring the Army. It was believed that division numbers familiar to the British public held recruiting value, and should be retained. As a result, the 76th Infantry (Reserve) Division was disbanded; its GOC, Utterson-Kelso and his staff, reformed the division as the 47th Infantry (Reserve) Division on 1 September. As part of this process, the 76th's 213th Infantry Brigade was renumbered the 140th and assigned to the 47th. Likewise, the 220th Infantry Brigade was assigned from the 76th to the 47th and in November 1944 was re-designated the 141st Infantry Brigade. The 7th Infantry Brigade, which was previously part of the 9th Armoured Division, was also assigned to the new division. Soldiers who had completed their basic and their job-specific training were sent to reserve divisions for additional training. (Note: Having entered military service, a recruit was assigned to the General Service Corps. He would then undertake six weeks' training at a Primary Training Centre and take aptitude and intelligence tests. The recruit would then be posted to a Corps Training Centre that specialised in the arm of the service he was joining. For those who would be joining the infantry, corps training involved a further sixteen-week course. For more specialised roles, such as signallers, it could be up to thirty weeks.) These soldiers were given five weeks of additional training at the section, platoon and company levels before undertaking a final three-day exercise. Troops would then be ready to be sent overseas to join other formations. Training was handled in this manner to relieve combat formations of the need to train new recruits. For example, the 9th Battalion, Dorsetshire Regiment trained soldiers who were then dispatched to other battalions within the regiment and the Royal Norfolk Regiment. The division remained in this role for the duration of the war. It was disbanded during the demobilisation of the British Armed Forces after the Second World War, and was non-existent by January 1946 when Utterson-Kelso retired. The TA was reformed in 1947 on a much smaller scale of nine divisions, which did not include the 47th. (Note: The 16th Airborne Division, 49th (West Riding) and 56th (London) Armoured Divisions and the 42nd (Lancashire), 43rd (Wessex), 44th (Home Counties), 50th (Northumbrian), 51st/52nd (Scottish), and 53rd (Welsh) infantry divisions.)

== General officers commanding ==
24 August 1939	Major-General Harry Willans
29 November 1940	Brigadier William Havelock Ramsden (acting)
8 December 1940	Major-General Clifford Cecil Malden
25 March 1941	Brigadier William Bradshaw (acting)
18 April 1941	Major-General John Edward Utterson-Kelso
10 April 1942	Major-General Gerald Templer
14 September 1942	Major-General Alfred Eryk Robinson
1 September 1944	Major-General John Edward Utterson-Kelso

== Order of battle ==
4th London Brigade

- 11th Battalion, Royal Fusiliers
- 12th Battalion, Royal Fusiliers
- 2nd Battalion, London Irish Rifles (Royal Ulster Rifles)

5th London Brigade

- 2nd Battalion, Queen's Westminsters (King's Royal Rifle Corps)
- 2nd Battalion, London Scottish (Gordon Highlanders)
- 2nd Battalion, London Rifle Brigade (Rifle Brigade)

Divisional Troops

- 2nd London Divisional artillery, Royal Artillery
  - 117th (7th London) Field Regiment
  - 138th (City of London) Field Regiment
  - 62nd Anti-Tank Regiment (from 7 October 1939)
- 2nd London Divisional Engineers, Royal Engineers
  - 501st Field Company (until 7 September 1939)
  - 502nd Field Company
  - 503rd Field Company
  - 504th Field Park Company
- 2nd London Divisional Signals, Royal Corps of Signals
- 2nd Battalion, Queen Victoria's Rifles (King's Royal Rifle Corps) (until 13 June 1940)

4th London Brigade (140th (London) Infantry Brigade from 21 November 1940)

- 11th Battalion, Royal Fusiliers
- 12th Battalion, Royal Fusiliers (until 16 September 1943)
- 2nd Battalion, London Irish Rifles (Royal Ulster Rifles) (until 30 November 1941)
- 4th London Infantry Brigade Anti-Tank Company (formed July 1940; renamed 140th (London) Infantry Brigade Anti-Tank Company 21 November 1940; left 28 November 1941)
- 6th Battalion, Oxfordshire and Buckinghamshire Light Infantry (from 1 December 1941, until 10 March 1942)
- 6th Battalion, Royal Irish Fusiliers (from 10 March 1942, until 2 October 1942)
- 17th Battalion, Royal Fusiliers (from 2 October 1942, until 10 December 1942)
- 2nd Battalion, Gloucestershire Regiment (from 10 December 1942, until 29 February 1944)
- 2/4th Battalion, Essex Regiment (from 17 September 1943)
- 11th Battalion, West Yorkshire Regiment (from 17 March 1944)

5th London Brigade (141st (London) Infantry Brigade from 21 November 1940)

- 2nd Battalion, Queen's Westminsters (King's Royal Rifle Corps) (until 23 November 1940)
- 2nd Battalion, London Scottish (Gordon Highlanders)
- 2nd Battalion, London Rifle Brigade (Rifle Brigade) (until 8 December 1940)
- 5th London Infantry Brigade Anti-Tank Company (renamed 141st (London) Infantry Brigade Anti-Tank Company 21 November 1940; left 28 November 1941)
- 16th Battalion, Royal Fusiliers (from 1 December 1940, until 18 September 1942)
- 17th Battalion, Royal Fusiliers (from 17 December 1940, until 2 October 1942)
- 6th Battalion, Royal Irish Fusiliers (from 2 October 1942, until 2 May 1944)
- 2nd Battalion, Royal Irish Fusiliers (from 3 May 1944)
- 30th Battalion, Black Watch (from 18 September, until 26 September 1942)
- 8th Battalion, Black Watch (from 27 September 1942, until 14 September 1943)
- 4th Battalion, Black Watch (from 6 November 1943)

25th Infantry Brigade

- 4th Battalion, Buffs (Royal East Kent Regiment) (until 28 October 1940)
- 4th Battalion, Border Regiment (until 5 January 1941)
- 2nd Battalion, Essex Regiment (until 29 February 1944)
- 25th Infantry Brigade Anti-Tank Company (from 8 July 1940, until 28 November 1941)
- 9th Battalion King's Own Royal Regiment (Lancaster) (from 27 November 1940, until 1 December 1942)
- 12th Battalion, South Staffordshire Regiment (from 11 December 1940, until 14 November 1941)
- 19th Battalion, Royal Fusiliers (from 2 January, until 24 September 1942)
- 20th Battalion, Royal Fusiliers (from 2 January, until 10 September 1942)
- 11th Battalion, York and Lancaster Regiment (from 24 September, until 16 December 1942)
- 30th Battalion, King's Own Yorkshire Light Infantry (from 10 September, until 26 September 1942)
- 6th Battalion, King's Own Yorkshire Light Infantry (from 27 September, left 13 December 1942)
- 9th Battalion, Norfolk Regiment (from 16 December 1942)
- 1st Battalion, Duke of Cornwall's Light Infantry (from 13 December 1942)
- 7th Battalion, North Staffordshire Regiment (from 5 March)

Divisional Troops

- 2nd/47th (London) Divisional artillery, Royal Artillery
  - 117th (7th London) Field Regiment
  - 138th (City of London) Field Regiment (until 13 July 1942)
  - 114th (Sussex) Field Regiment (until 28 November 1941)
  - 75th Field Regiment (from 1 February, left 10 April 1943)
  - 187th Field Regiment (from 24 April, until 26 June 1943)
  - 5th Field Regiment (from 26 June 1943)
  - 168th Field Regiment (from 11 June, until 21 November 1943)
  - 62nd Anti-Tank Regiment (until 8 November 1943)
  - 78th Anti-Tank Regiment (from 14 February, until 8 November 1943)
  - 89th Anti-Tank Regiment (from 9 November 1943)
  - 147th (Glasgow) Light Anti-Aircraft Regiment (from 18 October 1943
- 47th (London) Divisional Engineers, Royal Engineers
  - 502nd Field Company (until 4 January 1943)
  - 503rd Field Company (until 29 November 1941)
  - 222nd (2nd London) Field Company (from 16 July 1940, until 2 October 1943)
  - 179th Field Company (from 8 February, until 22 September 1943)
  - 610th Field Company (from 5 February 1943)
  - 507th Field Company (from 24 September 1943)
  - 504th Field Park Company (until 31 January 1942)
  - 47th (London) Field Stores Section (from 1 January 1942)
- 47th (London) Divisional Signals, Royal Corps of Signals
- 47th divisional reconnaissance, Reconnaissance Corps (Note: In June 1942, the Reconnaissance Corps universally adopted cavalry nomenclature. As a result, all companies were redesignated as squadrons.)
  - 47th Independent Company (from 3 December 1941, until 5 June 1942)
  - 47th Independent Squadron (from 6 June 1942, until 27 October 1943)

140th Infantry Brigade

- 4th Battalion, Oxfordshire and Buckinghamshire Light Infantry
- 6th Battalion, Royal Sussex Regiment
- 7th Battalion, Gloucestershire Regiment

220th Infantry Brigade (redesignated 141st Infantry Brigade on 17 November 1944)

- 8th Battalion, Suffolk Regiment
- 9th Battalion, Dorset Regiment
- 6th Battalion, Devonshire Regiment

7th Infantry Brigade (from 10 September 1944)

- 2/6th Battalion, East Surrey Regiment
- 13th Battalion, Queen's Royal Regiment (West Surrey)
- 12th Battalion, Royal Fusiliers (until 30 October 1944)
- 2/4th Battalion, Essex Regiment

Divisional Troops

- 47th Infantry (Reserve) Divisional artillery, Royal Artillery
  - 117th (7th London) Field Regiment
  - 173rd Field Regiment
  - 171st Field Regiment (from 30 May 1945)
  - 56th (Highland) Medium Regiment
  - 171st Heavy Regiment (from 27 February, until 29 May 1945)
- 47th Infantry (Reserve) Divisional Engineers, Royal Engineers
  - 250th Field Company
  - 507th Field Company (from 29 January 1945)
  - 649th Field Company (from 29 January 1945)
  - 47th (London) Field Stores Platoon
- 47th Infantry (Reserve) Divisional Signals, Royal Corps of Signals

== See also ==
- List of British divisions in World War II
- British Army Order of Battle (September 1939)
- British logistics in the Normandy Campaign

== Notes ==
Footnotes

Citations
