= 213th Brigade (United Kingdom) =

213th Brigade 213th Independent Infantry Brigade (Home) 213th Infantry Brigade
- Active: 2 November 1916 – 1 March 1918; 30 September 1940 – 1 September 1944
- Country: United Kingdom
- Branch: British Army
- Type: Infantry Brigade
- Role: Training and Home Defence

The 213th Brigade was a Home Defence and training formation of the British Army during both the First and Second World Wars.

== First World War ==
The 213th Brigade was first organised in November 1916 as part of the 71st Division, a new a Home Service and training formation formed from the 6th Provisional Brigade.

The Brigade was disbanded in March 1918.

=== Order of Battle ===
The following units constituted the Brigade:

- HQ: Aldershot
- 16th (Home Service) Battalion, Queen's (Royal West Surrey) Regiment: newly formed.
- 25th (Garrison) Battalion, Middlesex Regiment: originally formed from depot companies of 18th, 19th and 26th (Public Works Pioneers) Battalions Middlesex Regiment; left for Hong Kong 22 December 1916.
- 18th (Home Service) Battalion, Hampshire Regiment: newly formed 26 December 1916 to replace 25th Middlesex; disbanded December 1917.
- 66th Provisional Battalion: became 16th Battalion, Essex Regiment; disbanded December 1917
- 252nd Battalion Training Reserve: joined 9 July 1917; became 52nd (Graduated) Battalion, Bedfordshire Regiment
- 253rd Battalion Training Reserve: joined 17 September 1917; became 51st (Graduated) Battalion, Royal Sussex Regiment
- 52nd (Graduated) Battalion, Queen's (Royal West Surrey Regiment), joined from 214th Bde by 12 November 1917; transferred to 192nd Bde, 64th Division, 18 February 1918

=== Commander ===
- GOC: Brigadier-General W.MacL. Campbell

== Second World War ==
=== Formation and Service ===
A new brigade was formed for service in the United Kingdom on 30 September 1940 by No 13 Infantry Training Group in II Corps. Initially under the name of the 213th Independent Infantry Brigade (Home) it was composed of newly raised battalions. Between 1 November and 23 December 1940, it came under the command of the 18th Infantry Division, then moved it into the newly created Norfolk County Division. On 18 November 1941, the county division was re-designated as the 76th Infantry Division and simultaneously Brigade was renamed became the 213th Infantry Brigade.

On 1 September 1944, 76th Division HQ was disbanded, and its brigades transferred to replace those in 47th (London) Infantry Division, which were disbanding. The 47th Division was recreated as the 47th (Reserve) Infantry Division and the 213th Brigade was re-designated as the 140th Infantry Brigade, replacing the disbanded 140th (London) Infantry Brigade.

The 213th Brigade remained in the United Kingdom throughout its service.

=== Order of Battle ===
The following units constituted the brigade during the war:

- As part of II Corps and the Norfolk County Division.
  - 13th Battalion, Royal Warwickshire Regiment (30 September 1940 — 17 November 1941)
  - 11th Battalion, Worcestershire Regiment (30 September 1940 — 18 December 1940)
  - 9th Battalion, Royal Berkshire Regiment (30 September 1940 — 17 November 1941)
  - 14th Battalion, South Staffordshire Regiment (30 September 1940 — 17 November 1941)
  - 13th Battalion, South Staffordshire Regiment (18 November — 8 December 1940)
- As part of 76th Division.
  - 13th Battalion, Royal Warwickshire Regiment (18 November 1941 — 12 September 1942)
  - 9th Battalion, Royal Berkshire Regiment (18 November 1941 — 16 November 1943)
  - 14th Battalion, South Staffordshire Regiment (18 November 1941 — 13 December 1942, converted into 103rd Anti-Tank Regiment, Royal Artillery)
  - 7th Battalion, Royal Norfolk Regiment (14 September — 20 October 1942)
  - 9th Battalion, King's Own Scottish Borderers (14 December 1942 – 11 December 1943)
  - 11th Battalion, York and Lancaster Regiment (17 December 1942 – 15 November 1943)
  - 9th Battalion, Seaforth Highlanders (30 November 1942 – 16 November 1943)
  - 1st Battalion, Sherwood Foresters (15 November 1943 – 23 July 1944)
  - 4th Battalion, East Lancashire Regiment (15 November 1943 – 23 July 1944)
  - 7th Battalion, Border Regiment (15 November 1943 – 24 July 1944; re-designated 5th Battalion, Border Regiment 1 April 1944)
  - 4th Battalion, Oxfordshire and Buckinghamshire Light Infantry (24 July—31 August 1944)
  - 6th Battalion, Royal Sussex Regiment (30 July—31 August 1944)
  - 7th Battalion, Gloucestershire Regiment (3—31 August 1944)

=== Commanders ===
- Colonel J.V.R. Jackson (acting until 21 October 1940)
- Brigadier E.E.F. Baker (until 23 July 1942)
- Brigadier E.H.L. White

== Online sources ==
- the Long, Long Trail
- The Regimental Warpath 1914–1918
- The Royal Artillery 1939–45
