= John Utterson-Kelso =

British Army general (1893–1972)

Major-General John Utterson-Kelso CB DSO* OBE MC*
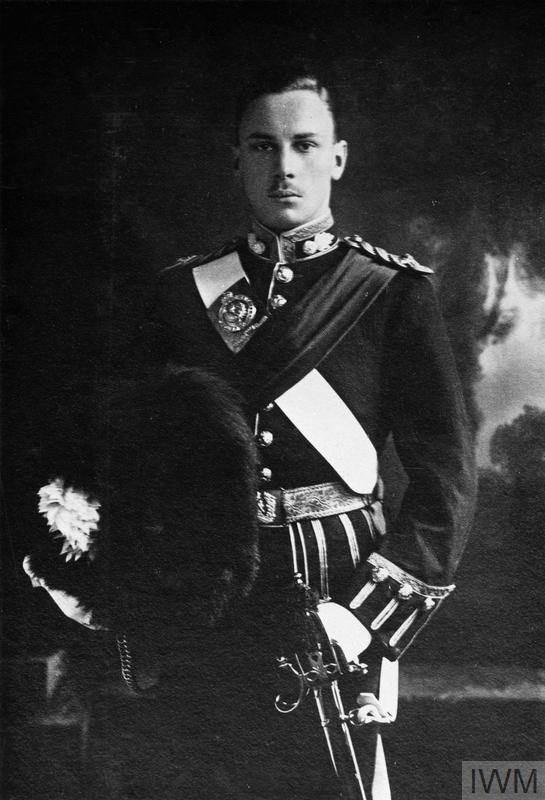
- Captain J. E. Utterson-Kelso in the First World War
- Born: 16 May 1893
- Died: 1972 (aged 78–79)
- Military career
- Allegiance: United Kingdom
- Branch: British Army
- Service years: 1912–1946
- Rank: Major-General
- Service number: 4982
- Units: Royal Scots Fusiliers; Devonshire Regiment
- Commands: 76th Infantry Division (1944); 47th (London) Infantry Division (1941–1942; 1944–1945); 131st (Surrey) Infantry Brigade (1939–1941); 2nd Battalion, Devonshire Regiment (1937–1939)
- Conflicts: First World War; Western Front; Second World War; Dunkirk evacuation
- Awards: Companion of the Order of the Bath; Distinguished Service Order & Bar; Officer of the Order of the British Empire; Military Cross & Bar; Mentioned in Despatches

Major-General John Edward Utterson-Kelso, CB, DSO & Bar, OBE, MC & Bar (1893–1972) was a British Army officer.

== Military career ==
Educated at Haileybury College, Utterson-Kelso entered the Royal Military College, Sandhurst, from where he was commissioned into the Royal Scots Fusiliers on 4 September 1912.

He saw service during the First World War, which began in the summer of 1914, for which he was awarded the Military Cross (MC) and, in September 1917, received a Bar to his MC, with the Bar's citation reading:

For conspicuous gallantry and devotion to duty when Adjutant of his battalion. Having assembled in an extremely difficult situation, he led them forward without confusion and overcame strong enemy resistance in spite of the fact that, owing to the difficulty of the ground, the units got left behind by our barrage. He captured fifty prisoners and two machine guns, and then organised his men and those of several other units and held the captured position.

Utterson-Kelso was also wounded five times, mentioned in despatches and awarded the Distinguished Service Order (DSO). The citation for his DSO reads:

For conspicuous gallantry and devotion to duty. Organised counter-attacks, leading his men with great skill and daring throughout prolonged fighting. Though twice buried by shell bursts and badly concussed, he remained at duty, setting a fine example, until his battalion was relieved.

Utterson-Kelso was later awarded a Bar to his DSO, with the Bar's citation reading:

For conspicuous gallantry and devotion to duty during the 91/2 miles advance east of Ypres from 28th September to 5th October, 1918. His battalion was one of the leading assault battalions in a five miles advance on to the southern end of Passhendaele Ridge. Although he was knocked down by a shell and severely shaken, he continued in command, refusing to leave. The battalion captured several guns and 200 prisoners. The next clay, at a critical period when the front line was held up, he pushed forward his battalion, which was then in support, and relieved the situation.

Utterson-Kelso became an instructor at the Small Arms School in 1928, commander of the Lines of Communications Troops in Palestine and Transjordan in 1936 and commanding officer of the 2nd Battalion, the Devonshire Regiment in 1937.

He went on to be commander of the 131st (Surrey) Infantry Brigade, part of the 44th (Home Counties) Division, in November 1939, two months after the outbreak of the Second World War, and landed in France with his brigade on 3 April 1940 to join the British Expeditionary Force (BEF). After taking part in the Dunkirk evacuation just a few weeks later, he continued to command the brigade until March 1941. From April 1941 he relinquished command of the brigade and, after being promoted to the acting rank of major general, served as General Officer Commanding (GOC) 47th (London) Infantry Division until April 1942. While in that position he became the first divisional GOC to incorporate battle drill into the training of units and higher formations.

This so impressed General Sir Bernard Paget, soon to be the Commander-in-Chief, Home Forces, that he made Utterson-Kelso as head of the infantry branch of the Directorate of Military Training at Headquarters Home Forces, holding this post until January 1944. He became GOC 76th Infantry Division in March 1944, before returning to his role as GOC 47th (London) Infantry Division in September 1944; he remained in that role until the end of the war.

== Bibliography ==
- Smart, Nick (2005). Biographical Dictionary of British Generals of the Second World War. Barnesley: Pen & Sword. ISBN 1844150496.

Military offices
Preceded by Clifford Malden	GOC 47th (London) Infantry Division; 1941–1942	Succeeded by Gerald Templer
Preceded by Colin Callander	GOC 76th Infantry Division; March–September 1944	Post disbanded
Preceded by Alfred Robinson	GOC 47th (London) Infantry Division; 1944–1945	Post disbanded
