= Alfred Robinson (British Army officer) =

British Army officer

Major-General Alfred Robinson CB DSO
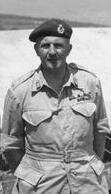
- Born: 19 September 1894; Scarborough, North Yorkshire, England
- Died: 4 March 1978 (aged 83)
- Military career
- Allegiance: United Kingdom
- Branch: British Army
- Service years: 1914–1948
- Rank: Major-General
- Service number: 9713
- Unit: Green Howards
- Commands: RAF Regiment (1945–48); 47th (London) Infantry Division (1942–44); 115th Infantry Brigade (1940–42); 1st Battalion, Green Howards (1939–40)
- Conflicts: First World War; Arab revolt in Palestine; Second World War
- Awards: Companion of the Order of the Bath; Distinguished Service Order; Mentioned in Despatches (2)

Major-General Alfred Eryk Robinson, CB, DSO (19 September 1894 – 4 March 1978) was a British Army officer.

== Military career ==
Robinson was born in Scarborough, North Yorkshire, on 19 September 1894, and was educated at Scarborough College. He later entered the Royal Military College, Sandhurst, from where he was commissioned into the Green Howards on 12 August 1914 and saw service during the First World War. He was wounded twice during the war and was also mentioned in despatches twice.

Robinson remained in the army during the interwar period and the start of the Second World War saw him as commanding officer of the 1st Battalion the Green Howards in 1939 and commanded the battalion during the Norwegian campaign, before being given command of 115th Brigade in October 1940 on his return to England. He went on to be General Officer Commanding 47th (London) Infantry Division in September 1942, Director-General of Air Defence at the Air Ministry in 1944 and Inspector of Ground Combat Training at the Air Ministry in 1945, before retiring in 1948.

Robinson was colonel of the Green Howards from 1949 to 1959. He was a Deputy Lieutenant for North Riding of Yorkshire from 1952 and a Justice of the peace from 1953.

== Bibliography ==
- Smart, Nick (2005). Biographical Dictionary of British Generals of the Second World War. Barnesley: Pen & Sword. ISBN 1844150496.

Military offices
| Preceded by Gerald Templer | GOC 47th (London) Infantry Division; 1942–1944 | Succeeded by John Utterson-Kelso |
| Preceded by Sir Claude Liardet | Commandant-General of the RAF Regiment; 1945–1948 | Succeeded by Harold Lydford |
Honorary titles
| Preceded by Sir Harold Franklyn | Colonel of the Green Howards (Alexandria, Princess of Wales's Own Yorkshire Regiment); 1949–1959 | Succeeded by George Wilfred Eden |
