= 35th Brigade (United Kingdom) =

35th Brigade 35th Infantry Brigade
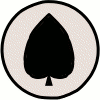
- British 12th (Eastern) Division Insignia
- Active: 1914–1919; 1939–1940
- Country: United Kingdom
- Branch: British Army
- Type: Infantry
- Size: Brigade
- Part of: 12th (Eastern) Division; 12th (Eastern) Infantry Division; 1st London Infantry Division

Commanders
- Notable commanders: Arthur Solly-Flood; Euston Baker

The 35th Brigade was an infantry brigade formation of the British Army that saw active service in both the First and the Second World Wars.

== First World War ==
It was one of the New Army or Kitchener's Army brigades, and assigned to the 12th (Eastern) Division and served on the Western Front during the First World War.

=== Order of battle, First World War ===
- 7th (Service) Battalion, Norfolk Regiment
- 7th (Service) Battalion, Suffolk Regiment
- 9th (Service) Battalion, Essex Regiment
- 5th (Service) Battalion, Princess Charlotte of Wales's (Royal Berkshire Regiment)
- 1/1st Battalion, Cambridgeshire Regiment
- 35th Machine Gun Company, Machine Gun Corps
- 35th Trench Mortar Battery

== Second World War ==
The brigade was disbanded after the war in 1919. However, it was reformed in the Territorial Army, now as the 35th Infantry Brigade, in 1939 when the Territorial Army was doubled in size. The brigade was raised as a duplicate of the 131st Infantry Brigade and consisted of three 2nd Line battalions of the Queen's Royal Regiment (West Surrey). The brigade again served with the 12th (Eastern) Infantry Division and was sent with the division to France in 1940 to join the rest of the British Expeditionary Force. The division and brigade both suffered very heavy casualties during the Battle of France and had to be evacuated to England. The 12th Division was disbanded in July 1940, due to the heavy casualties it suffered and the brigade was transferred to the 1st London Division, reforming it as a standard infantry division. In November 1940 the brigade was redesignated 169th (London) Infantry Brigade, and served with the 56th Division for the remainder of the war.

=== Order of battle, Second World War ===
- 2/5th Battalion, Queen's Royal Regiment (West Surrey)
- 2/6th Battalion, Queen's Royal Regiment (West Surrey)
- 2/7th Battalion, Queen's Royal Regiment (West Surrey)
- 35th Infantry Brigade Anti-Tank Company (formed 2 November 1940)
