= Colin Callander =

British Army general (1897–1979)

Lieutenant-General Sir Colin Callander KCB KBE MC
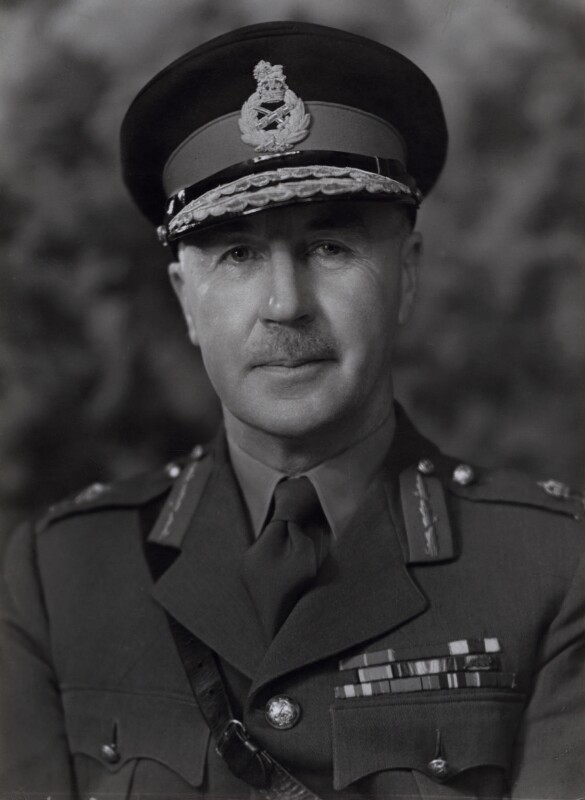
- Born: 13 March 1897; Ilminster, Somerset, England
- Died: 31 May 1979 (aged 82); Cranbrook, Kent, England
- Military career
- Allegiance: United Kingdom
- Branch: British Army
- Service years: 1915–1957
- Rank: Lieutenant-General
- Service number: 10503
- Units: Royal Munster Fusiliers; Leicestershire Regiment
- Commands: 2nd Division (1949–1951); 4th Infantry Division (1945–1946); 76th Infantry Division (1943–1944); 54th (East Anglian) Infantry Division (1943); 159th Infantry Brigade (1941–1942); 1/5th Battalion, Leicestershire Regiment (c. 1940)
- Conflicts: First World War; North West Frontier; Second World War
- Awards: Knight Commander of the Order of the Bath; Knight Commander of the Order of the British Empire; Military Cross; Mentioned in Despatches

Lieutenant-General Sir Colin Bishop Callander, KCB, KBE, MC (13 March 1897 – 31 May 1979) was a senior British Army officer who served as Military Secretary from 1954 to 1957.

== Military career ==
Born in Ilminster, Somerset, on 13 March 1897, Callander was educated at Ilminster Grammar School, and West Buckland School.

Shortly after the outbreak of the First World War in August 1914, Callander entered the Royal Military College at Sandhurst, and, after passing out from there, was commissioned into the Royal Munster Fusiliers in June 1915. He served with his regiment on the Western Front, gaining the Military Cross (MC) in September 1916, and being wounded three times during the war. The citation for his MC reads:

For conspicuous gallantry. When a torpedo failed to cut the enemy's wire completely, he went with two men to cut it with wire-cutters. When both men had been wounded, he carried on for fifteen minutes and completed the work.

Remaining in the army during the interwar period, Callander transferred to the Leicestershire Regiment in 1922, and married the following year. After attending the Staff College, Camberley from 1933 to 1934, he was promoted to major in 1936 and went to the North West Frontier in India in 1938, for which he was mentioned in despatches.

Callander served during the Second World War, where his rise in rank was rapid. He commanded first the 1/5th Battalion of the Leicestershire Regiment, followed by a brief period from April to May 1941 as the acting commander of the 148th Independent Infantry Brigade, his battalion's parent formation, which was then followed by his promotion to the acting rank of brigadier in July that year, upon assuming command of the 159th Infantry Brigade. Holding this position from August 1941 to May 1942, his next appointment was an 11-month stint as a Brigadier General Staff (BGS) of Western Command before becoming General Officer Commanding (GOC) of the 54th (East Anglian) Infantry Division, upon his promotion to the acting rank of major-general on 17 May 1943. This was followed by becoming GOC 76th Infantry Division in December 1943, before being assigned GOC 4th Division in Greece in April 1945. Later that year he took the unconditional surrender at Knossos of German Forces serving in Crete under Generalmajor Hans-Georg Benthack.

Callander became Director General of Military Training at the War Office in London in 1948, and was appointed GOC 2nd Division in the British Army of the Rhine (BAOR) in 1949. He was appointed Military Secretary in 1954 and retired in 1957. He was Colonel of the Royal Leicestershire Regiment from April 1954 to May 1963. He retired to Kent, where he spent his final years until his death in May 1979, at the age of 82.

== Bibliography ==
- Smart, Nick (2005). Biographical Dictionary of British Generals of the Second World War. Barnsley, South Yorkshire: Pen and Sword Books. ISBN 1844150496.

Military offices
| Preceded by Charles Wainwright | GOC 54th (East Anglian) Infantry Division; May–December 1943 | Succeeded by Cyril Lomax (as GOC East Anglia District) |
| Preceded by William Ozanne | GOC 76th Infantry Division; 1943–1944 | Succeeded by John Utterson-Kelso |
| Preceded by Dudley Ward | GOC 4th Infantry Division; 1945–1946 | Succeeded by Ernest Down |
| Preceded by Philip Roberts | GOC 2nd Division; 1949–1951 | Succeeded by Basil Coad |
| Preceded by Sir Euan Miller | Military Secretary; 1954–1957 | Succeeded by Sir Hugh Stockwell |
Honorary titles
| Preceded by Harold Pinder | Colonel of the Royal Leicestershire Regiment; 1954–1963 | Succeeded by Sir Douglas Kendrew |
