= 173rd Field Regiment, Royal Artillery =

7th Defence Regiment, RA 173rd Field Regiment, RA
- Royal Artillery cap badge
- Active: 4 October 1940– 28 March 1943; 20 July 1943–7 January 1945
- Country: United Kingdom
- Branch: British Army
- Role: Field artillery
- Size: 3–4 Batteries
- Part of: 48th (South Midland) Infantry Division; 76th Infantry (Reserve) Division; 47th Infantry (Reserve) Division

The 173rd Field Regiment was a unit of Britain's Royal Artillery (RA) during World War II. Originally formed to man beach defence batteries, it was later converted to field artillery. It served in Home Forces and supplied trained gunners to the fighting fronts, but saw no active service. It was disbanded after the war.

== 7th Defence Regiment ==
After the British Expeditionary Force was evacuated from Dunkirk and the United Kingdom was threatened with invasion, a crash programme of installing coastal artillery batteries was implemented in the summer of 1940.

Later, as the Home Defence strategy developed, the Royal Artillery formed a number of 'Defence Batteries' to deploy around the coastline for general beach defence. These were not part of the RA's Coast Artillery branch, nor were they included in the field forces under Commander-in-Chief, Home Forces, but equipped with whatever old guns were available they freed up scarce field artillery from static beach defence for the mobile counter-attack forces. Most of these batteries were formed on 1 September 1940, and they were grouped into regiments from 4 October. The 7th Defence Regiment was formed in Lincolnshire, with 924–929 Defence Batteries. On 15 March 1941 924, 927, and 928 Defence Btys were disbanded.

== 173rd Field Regiment ==
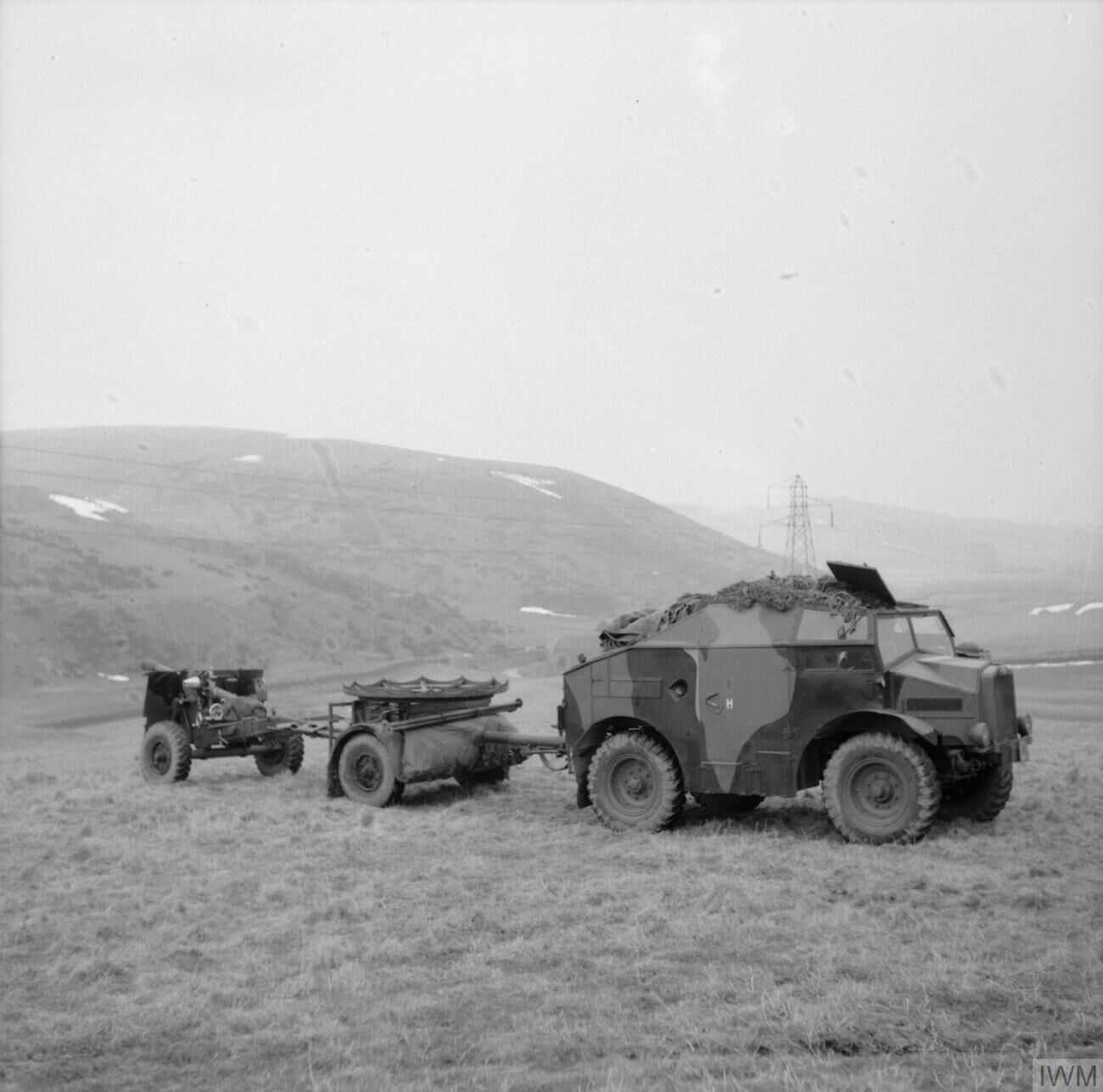
A 25-pounder gun and Quad tractor on a training exercise in the UK.

By the beginning of 1942 the imminent threat of invasion had passed, the coast artillery batteries were fully established, and the RA required gunners for the field forces. The remaining Defence Regiments in the UK were disbanded or converted into field artillery. On 12 January 1942 7th Defence Rgt at Thornton House, Horncastle, Lincolnshire, was converted into 173rd Field Regiment, and 925, 926 and 929 Defence Btys were designated A, B and C Btys; 923 (Independent) Defence Bty was also incorporated into C Bty. A, B and C Btys were redesignated P, Q and R on 11 March. At this period the establishment of a field regiment was three batteries, each of two troops of four 25-pounder guns.

Divisional insignia of 48th Division.

On its formation the regiment was assigned to 48th (South Midland) Division, which had recently been placed on a lower establishment as a home defence formation with no immediate prospect of overseas service. At the time the division was in I Corps District covering the Lincolnshire coast. (This became Headquarters (HQ) East Riding and Lincolnshire District later in 1942 when I Corps HQ went to Tunisia in Operation Torch.) From 20 December 1942 48th Division was downgraded further and redesignated 48th Infantry (Reserve) Division.

On 1 January 1943 the regiment's batteries were numbered as 156, (Note: A previous 156 Bty had existed in the Royal Field Artillery between 1919 and 1920.) 157 and 158 Field Btys. But on 11 January the batteries were transferred to 180th Field Rgt, which had recently joined the division. Regimental HQ (RHQ) of 173rd Field Rgt remained without any batteries to command until 28 March when it was disbanded at Grimsthorpe Castle in Lincolnshire.

However, on 20 July 1943, RHQ of 173rd Field Rgt was reformed at Park Villa, Alford, Lincolnshire, when 156, 157 and 158 Field Btys returned from 180th Field Rgt, together with 138 Field Bty transferred from that regiment in addition. The reformed regiment was assigned to 76th Infantry (Reserve) Division on 16 November 1943.

The primary role of the reserve divisions now was to provide trained reinforcements to units serving in active theatres. After D Day on 6 June 1944 this was mainly to 21st Army Group fighting in Normandy. Having supplied most of its manpower as reinforcements, 76th Division was disbanded on 1 September 1944 and reformed as 47th Infantry (Reserve) Division.

The regiment and its batteries were disbanded on 7 January 1945, except 138 Bty, which joined 117th (7th London) Field Rgt in 47th Division.
