= Harry Willans =

British Army general

Major-General Harry Willans CB CBE DSO MC
- Born: 1892; Bedford, Bedfordshire, England
- Died: 5 February 1943 (aged 50−51); Tobruk
- Burial place: Tobruk War Cemetery
- Military career
- Allegiance: United Kingdom
- Branch: British Army
- Service years: 1916−1943
- Rank: Major-General
- Service number: 16877
- Commands: 168th (2nd London) Infantry Brigade; 47th (London) Infantry Division
- Conflicts: First World War; Second World War
- Awards: Companion of the Order of the Bath; Commander of the Order of the British Empire; Distinguished Service Order; Military Cross; Mentioned in dispatches (2)

Major-General Harry Willans CB, CBE, DSO, MC (1892 – 5 February 1943) was a British Army officer.

== Military career ==
Born the son of James and Henrietta Willans and educated at Aldenham School, Willans was commissioned into the Bedfordshire Regiment on 23 May 1916. He was awarded the Military Cross in January 1917 and appointed a companion of the Distinguished Service Order in June 1918.

He became commanding officer of the Artists Rifles in 1933, commander of the 168th (2nd London) Infantry Brigade in May 1938 and General Officer Commanding (GOC) 47th (London) Infantry Division in August 1939. With this assignment came the rank of major general. He went on to be Director-General of Welfare and Education at the War Office in December 1940. He was killed in a flying accident at El Adem Airfield near Tobruk in February 1943.

He was appointed a Companion of the Order of the Bath in the 1943 New Year Honours.

== Bibliography ==
- Smart, Nick (2005). Biographical Dictionary of British Generals of the Second World War. Barnesley: Pen & Sword. ISBN 1844150496.

Military offices
Preceded by Clive Liddell	GOC 47th (London) Infantry Division; 1939–1940	Succeeded by Clifford Malden
