= Clifford Malden =

British Army general

Major-General Clifford Malden
- Born: 1890; Tunbridge Wells, Kent, England
- Died: 25 March 1941 (aged 50–51); Shoreham-by-Sea, West Sussex, England
- Burial place: St Alban's Church, Frant, East Sussex, England
- Military career
- Allegiance: United Kingdom
- Branch: British Army
- Service years: 1908–1941
- Rank: Major-General
- Service number: 6310
- Unit: Royal Sussex Regiment
- Commands: 1st Battalion, Royal Sussex Regiment; 47th (London) Infantry Division
- Conflicts: First World War; Second World War

Major-General Clifford Cecil Malden (1890 – 25 March 1941) was a British Army officer who served in both of the world wars.

== Military career ==
Born in 1890 in Tunbridge Wells, Kent, Malden was commissioned into the Royal Sussex Regiment on 4 April 1908 and saw service as a captain during the First World War.

He remained in the army during the interwar period and attended the Staff College, Camberley, from 1924 to 1925, as a student, and soon returned as an instructor. He played cricket and hockey for the British Army and, from 1934 to 1936 he was Commanding Officer of the 1st Battalion, Royal Sussex Regiment. In 1936 he went to England to attend the Imperial Defence College and was promoted to colonel in the same year and married the following year, the same year that he was to serve, until 1938, on the staff at the War Office.

He became Director of Infantry at the War Office in August 1939, shortly before the outbreak of the Second World War, Director of Military Training at the War Office in October and General Officer Commanding (GOC) of the 47th (London) Infantry Division, a Territorial Army formation, in November 1940. His command was destined to be short-lived, however, as he was inadvertently killed after setting off a mine at Shoreham-by-Sea in March 1941.

== Bibliography ==
- Smart, Nick (2005). Biographical Dictionary of British Generals of the Second World War. Barnesley: Pen & Sword. ISBN 1844150496.

Military offices
Preceded by Harry Willans	GOC 47th (London) Infantry Division; 1940–1941	Succeeded by John Utterson-Kelso
