= 102nd Light Anti-Aircraft Regiment, Royal Artillery =

7th Bn, Lincolnshire Regiment 102nd Light Anti-Aircraft Regiment, RA
- Cap badge of the Royal Artillery
- Active: July 1940–4 February 1946
- Country: United Kingdom
- Branch: British Army
- Role: Infantry; Air defence
- Size: Battalion; Regiment
- Part of: I Corps
- Engagements: Normandy; Low Countries

The 102nd Light Anti-Aircraft Regiment, Royal Artillery, (102nd LAA Rgt) was an air defence unit of the British Army during World War II. Initially raised as an infantry battalion of the Lincolnshire Regiment in 1940, it transferred to the Royal Artillery in 1941. It served with I Corps in the campaign in North West Europe, at times acting as infantry or administrative troops when the threat of air attack had diminished. It was disbanded after the war.

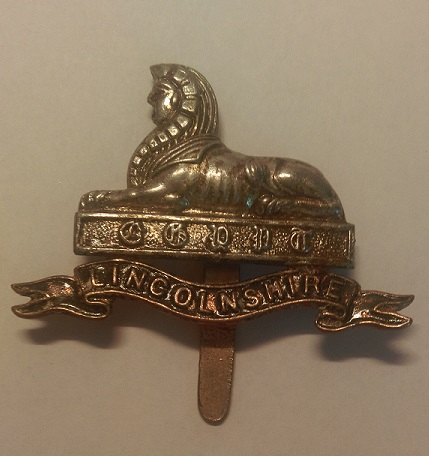
The Lincolnshire Regiment's cap badge.

== 7th Battalion, Lincolnshire Regiment ==
The unit was originally formed in July 1940 at Tollerton Park, near Nottingham as 7th Battalion, Lincolnshire Regiment, as part of the rapid expansion of the Army with wartime conscripts. On 10 October, the battalion joined 205th Independent Infantry Brigade (Home), which was being organised by No 5 Infantry Training Group as a static defence formation. Initially it came under 1st Infantry Division, then North Midland Area, until Lincolnshire County Division was formed in March 1941 to defend the Lincolnshire coast.

Late in 1941, Lincolnshire County Division began to be broken up and a number of its units and formations were converted to other roles. While 205th Bde was converted into a tank brigade, 7th Lincolns was selected to be retrained in the light anti-aircraft (LAA) role equipped with Bofors 40 mm guns. It left on 27 November 1941 and on 1 December it transferred to the Royal Artillery (RA) as 102nd LAA Regiment, comprising Regimental Headquarters and 336, 337 and 338 LAA Batteries.

== 102nd Light Anti-Aircraft Regiment, Royal Artillery ==
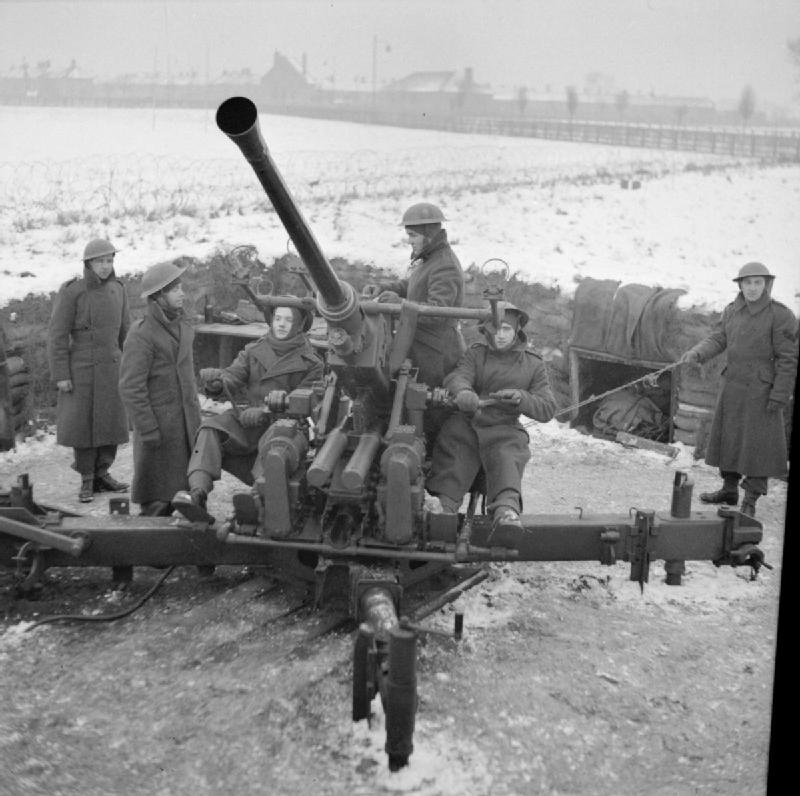
A Bofors 40 mm LAA gun crew under training, January 1942.

After initial training the regiment joined Anti-Aircraft Command, but left in February 1942 before it had been allocated to a brigade. At first it formed part of the War Office Reserve, but by April it came under XI Corps District in East Anglia. In early October 1942 the regiment was joined by a Royal Electrical and Mechanical Engineers (REME) workshop sub-section for each battery, to be ready for mobile warfare. By mid-March 1943 the regiment left XI Corps District and joined I Corps in 21st Army Group, preparing for the Allied invasion of Normandy (Operation Overlord).

=== Normandy ===
I Corps was one of the assault formations on D Day, landing two divisions, followed by the rest of the corps over succeeding days. The main role of a corps LAA regiment was to protect headquarters and gun areas from air attack. Attacks by formations of up to 20 Messerschmitt Bf 109 and Focke-Wulf Fw 190 fighter-bombers began from D + 1, but initially were mainly directed at the shipping targets and beaches, or against the bridgeheads over the River Orne and Caen Canal at Benouville, rather than the frontline formations. From D + 6 the Luftwaffe 's objectives included positions in front of Caen where I Corps was battling to take the city. In the first three weeks of the campaign, 22 hostile aircraft were shot down over I Corps, though the LAA gunners still showed their inexperience. As the AA defences increased and Allied fighters gained air superiority, air attacks on the beachhead area diminished.

102nd LAA Regiment covered I Corps during Operation Epsom, and then in Operation Charnwood, which finally succeeded in taking Caen on 9 July. Since the Allies had achieved air superiority over the beachhead, there was little call for AA defence, and AA units became increasingly used to supplementing the artillery to support ground operations. LAA units fired tracer to guide night attacks onto their objectives, and the Bofors guns were much in demand for infantry support. They could give useful close-range fire to help infantry working from cover to cover in the bocage; the Bofors' rapid fire was good for suppressing enemy heavy weapons, the 40 mm round's sensitive percussion fuze providing an airburst effect among trees. It was also used for 'bunker-busting', though the lack of protection made the gun detachment vulnerable to return fire. LAA units also provided 'refuge strips' for air observation post aircraft spotting for the field guns: a Bofors troop deployed with Local Warning radar and ground observers could alert the pilot to the presence of enemy aircraft and provide protection for him.

On 23 July, I Corps was placed under First Canadian Army and as II Canadian Corps began driving south towards Falaise in Operation Totalize on 8 August, I Corps extended the eastern flank. Once the breakout from the beachhead was achieved in mid August and II Canadian Corps closed off the Falaise Pocket, I Corps began advancing eastwards along the coast. On 30 August, it crossed the River Seine. While Second Army drove quickly to Brussels and Antwerp, First Canadian Army swung north to clear the coast, with I Corps capturing Le Havre in Operation Astonia (10–12 September). By now the Luftwaffe was almost absent, having lost heavily and been driven from its airfields.

=== Low Countries ===
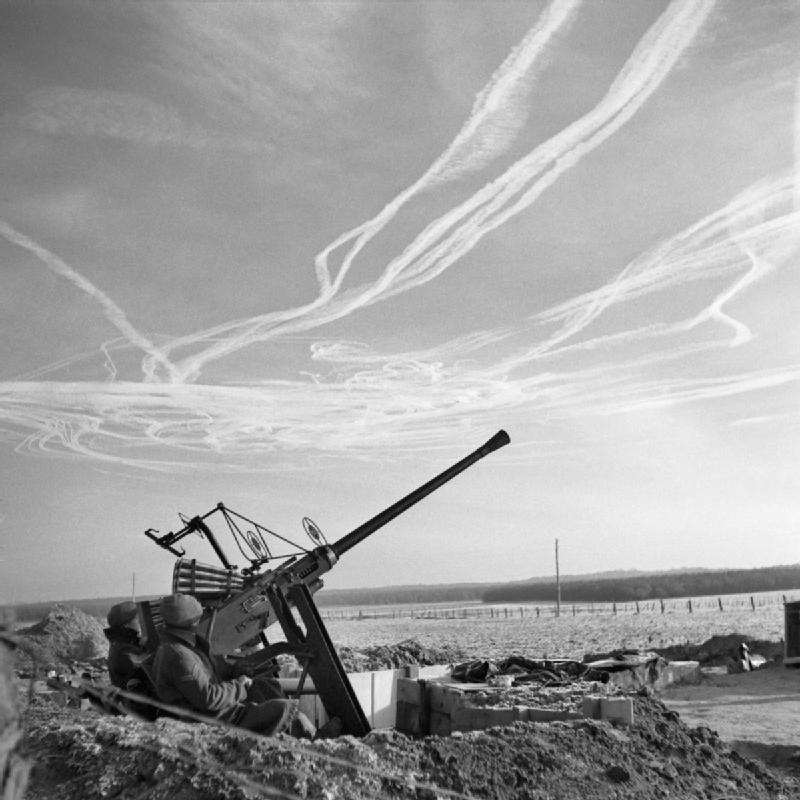
A Bofors gun crew watches vapour trails over the Dutch–German border, December 1944.

The strategic requirement now was to clear the Scheldt Estuary and get the port of Antwerp into use as an Allied supply base. I Corps was moved to the east of the port to assist. By early October it was fighting its way towards Roosendaal in Operation Pheasant with a collection of British, Canadian, Polish and US divisions. For 17 days in October, while these operations were proceeding, a 7,000 yards (6,400 m) length of I Corps' front was held by 'Bobforce', led by 89th LAA Rgt of 49th (West Riding) Division with some armoured cars, anti-tank guns, two machine gun companies and a Belgian infantry battalion. The corps regiment, 102nd LAA, then joined Bobforce, acting as infantry. At the end of this spell, Bobforce advanced under covering fire from Bofors guns and drove the enemy rearguards back 3 miles (4.8 km).

After this fighting died down I Corps held the River Maas front through the winter. Fears of a German incursion over the river in support of their Ardennes Offensive came to nothing. At the end of January 1945 I Corps carried out an operation against a German bridgehead at Kapelsche Veer (Operation Elephant) involving the whole of the corps artillery. By this stage of the campaign it was common for LAA guns together with mortars and anti-tank guns to join in 'Pepperpot' bombardments to saturate enemy positions before an infantry attack. I Corps continued its activities along the Maas in early 1945 to divert attention from First Canadian Army's main operations in the Reichswald (Operation Veritable).

After 21st Army Group had crossed the Rhine, I Corps was replaced in First Canadian Army by a Canadian corps from Italy, and reverted to the command of Second Army on 2 April. However, it was given no role in the advance across Germany, remaining in the Netherlands where it became an administrative HQ, still with 102nd LAA Rgt under its command. After VE Day the regiment continued with occupation duties in NW Europe until it was disbanded on 4 February 1946.
