= 36th Tank Brigade =

36th Army Tank Brigade 36th Tank Brigade
- Formation sign of the 36th Army Tank Brigade.
- Active: 1941–1943
- Disbanded: 30 July 1943
- Country: United Kingdom
- Branch: British Army
- Type: Armoured brigade
- Role: Home Defence; Training
- Size: Brigade

The 36th Tank Brigade was a short-lived armoured brigade of the British Army raised during the Second World War. The brigade remained in the United Kingdom for its service and did not serve overseas, being disbanded in July 1943.

== Origins ==
The 36th Army Tank Brigade was created in the Second World War on 1 December 1941 by the conversion of the Headquarters of the 205th Independent Infantry Brigade (Home). The regiments in the brigade were all converted from infantry battalions that had been transferred to the Royal Armoured Corps, but they still maintained their own infantry cap badges on the black beret of the Royal Armoured Corps.

On 12 August 1942 the brigade dropped the 'Army' from its title and was redesignated 36th Tank Brigade. Throughout its existence the brigade remained in Eastern Command and in the United Kingdom until 30 July 1943 when the regiments were broken up and the day after, the brigade Headquarters was disbanded.

=== Order of battle ===
36th Tank Brigade was constituted as follows during the war:

- 154th Regiment Royal Armoured Corps (previously 9th Battalion, North Staffordshire Regiment)
- 156th Regiment Royal Armoured Corps (previously 11th Battalion, Highland Light Infantry)
- 157th Regiment Royal Armoured Corps (previously 10th Battalion, Hampshire Regiment)

=== Commanders ===
The following officers commanded 36th Tank Brigade during the war:

- Brigadier R. Morton (until 27 December 1941)
- Brigadier K.E.S. Stewart (from 27 December 1941 until 24 May 1943)
- Colonel J.P. Fowler-Esson (Acting, from 24 May 1943)

== See also ==
- British Armoured formations of World War II
- List of British brigades of the Second World War

== Bibliography ==
- Cole, Howard (1973). Formation Badges of World War 2. Britain, Commonwealth and Empire. London: Arms and Armour Press.
- Joslen, H. F. (2003) [1960]. Orders of Battle: Second World War, 1939–1945. Uckfield, East Sussex: Naval and Military Press. ISBN 978-1-84342-474-1.
