= 205th Independent Infantry Brigade (Home) =

- Active: 10 October 1940 – 1 December 1941
- Country: United Kingdom
- Branch: British Army
- Type: Infantry Brigade
- Role: Home Defence

The 205th Independent Infantry Brigade (Home) was a short-lived Home Defence infantry brigade formation of the British Army during the Second World War.

== Formation and Service ==
The 205th Independent Infantry Brigade (Home) was formed in the Second World War for service in the United Kingdom on 10 October 1940 by No 5 Infantry Training Group. It was commanded by Brigadier R. Morton and comprised one Territorial Army battalion and three newly raised infantry battalions.

Soon after formation the brigade came under command of North Midlands Area, transferring to the Lincolnshire County Division when that was formed on 27 February 1941. The Lincolnshire County Division ceased to function on 24 November and the Brigade lasted only a few days more, its battalions were dispersed.

The headquarters of the Brigade were re-designated HQ 36th Army Tank Brigade on 1 December 1941.

== Order of battle ==
The composition of 205th Brigade was as follows:

- 7th Battalion, Royal Norfolk Regiment (10 October 1940 – 5 November 1941, a 2nd Line Territorial Army pioneer battalion that had seen service during the Battle of France)
- 7th Battalion, Lincolnshire Regiment (10 October 1940 —27 November 1941, converted that year to the 102nd Light Anti-Aircraft Regiment, Royal Artillery)
- 7th Battalion, Leicestershire Regiment (10 October 1940 – 25 November 1941)
- 8th Battalion, North Staffordshire Regiment (10 October 1940 – 29 November 1941, converted in March 1942 to the 180th Field Regiment, Royal Artillery)
