= 76th Infantry Division (United Kingdom) =

76th Infantry Division 76th Infantry (Reserve) Division
- The divisional insignia was a red Norfolk wherry
- Active: 18 November 1941–1 September 1944
- Country: United Kingdom
- Branch: British Army
- Type: Infantry
- Role: Home defence, training and deception.

The 76th Infantry Division was an infantry division of the British Army, which was formed in November 1941 and served during the Second World War. It was created when the Norfolk County Division, initially raised in 1940 to defend the Norfolk coast from a potential German invasion, was redesignated. The division maintained the defensive duties that had been assigned to it, prior to it being renamed, until late 1942 when it became a training formation. It was then responsible for providing final tactical and field training to soldiers who had already passed their initial training. After five additional weeks of training, the soldiers were posted to fighting formations overseas. The formation was used as a source of reinforcements for the 21st Army Group, that was fighting in the Normandy campaign. After all available British troops had left the United Kingdom for France, the division was disbanded in September 1944.

In addition to the actual formation, a phantom 76th Infantry Division was formed for deception purposes. The phantom division was part of the notional British Fourth Army, to be used for the fictitious Operation Trolleycar. This operation aimed to deceive the Germans into believing that an Allied landing would occur along the northern German coast. While the deception effort was not a complete success, it managed to divert German attention to the northern flank for the remainder of the war.

== Background ==
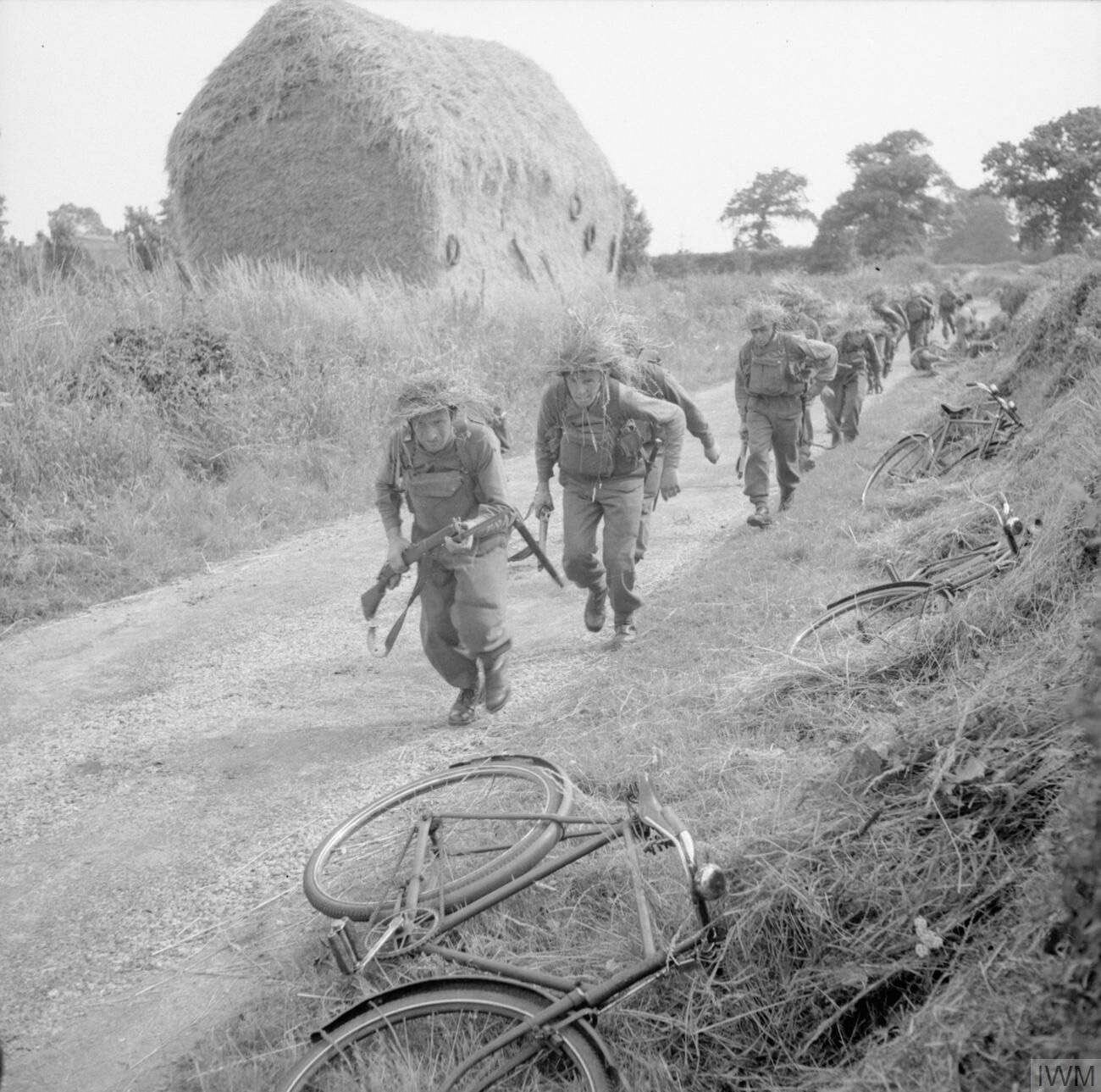
Men of the 8th Battalion, Lincolnshire Regiment, during an anti-invasion exercise in Norfolk, 1941

In the early stages of the Second World War following the Battle of France in 1940, the United Kingdom was under threat of invasion from Germany but during the summer, the Battle of Britain dampened this threat. As the year progressed, the size of the British Army increased dramatically as 140 new infantry battalions were raised. In late 1940, with the possibility of a German invasion during 1941, these new battalions were formed into independent infantry brigades that were then loaned to newly created County Divisions.

The County Divisions, including the Norfolk County Division, were around 10,000 men strong and assigned to defend the coast of threatened sections of the country, undertaking defensive tasks including the manning of coastal artillery. These divisions were largely static, lacking mobility and also divisional assets such as artillery, engineers and reconnaissance forces. Using the new formations in this manner allowed the pre-war regular infantry divisions to undertake training and form an all-important reserve that could be used to counter-attack any possible German landing.

On 22 June, Germany launched Operation Barbarossa the invasion of the Soviet Union; this attack all but removed the German threat to the United Kingdom. The British still had to consider the threat of an invasion, due to the possibility that the Soviet Union could collapse under the German onslaught, after which Germany could easily transfer troops back to the west. With the arrival of winter in late 1941, the threat of invasion subsided. This, coupled with the production of new equipment for the British army, allowed the War Office to begin steps to better balance the army, due to the large number of infantry units formed during the preceding year and a half; as part of this reform, the County Divisions were disbanded. (Note: The large intake of men into the army had considerably increased the infantry arm. The reforms intended to address this, with many of the newly raised battalions being "converted to other arms, particularly artillery and armour". In addition to this, historian F. W. Perry comments, there was considerable pressure "to increase the armoured component [of the army] and build up raiding and special forces". These pressures and the re-balancing of the military, resulted in seven of the nine County Divisions being disbanded and only two being reformed as infantry divisions.)

== History ==
=== Home defence ===
During the war, the divisions of the British Army were divided between "Higher Establishment" and "Lower Establishment" formations. The former were intended for deployment overseas and combat, whereas the latter were strictly for home defence in a static role. On 18 November 1941, the Norfolk County Division was abolished and reformed as the 76th Infantry Division, a "Lower Establishment" division. The division, like its predecessor, comprised the 213th, the 220th and the 222nd Infantry Brigades. That day, the division was assigned artillery, an anti-tank regiment, engineers and signallers; reconnaissance troops joined the division in January 1942. The paper strength of an infantry division at this time was 17,298 men. Major-General William Ozanne, who had commanded the Norfolk County Division since its inception, retained command of the division. The 76th Division was assigned to II Corps and maintained its previous mission of defending the Norfolk coastline. The Imperial War Museum comments that the division insignia, a "red Norfolk wherry, under sail", underscored "the association of the Division with Norfolk". After the division became a training formation, the insignia was only worn by the permanent division members.

The division was involved in establishing the ability of the Abwehr (German military intelligence). A German-published order of battle of the British army based within the United Kingdom, dated 10 April 1942, was captured. This document included the division and had a near perfect listing of its subordinate units, with one exception. Rather than including the 1st Battalion, Leicestershire Regiment, the Germans believed the 18th Battalion, Welch Regiment had already replaced it. This and similar errors led the British to understand the capability of the Germans to intercept wireless communications in the United Kingdom. In 1943, this, in part, led to the Operation Fortitude a plan to exploit the German ability and deceive their intelligence community about future Allied operations like Operation Overlord.

=== Training formation ===
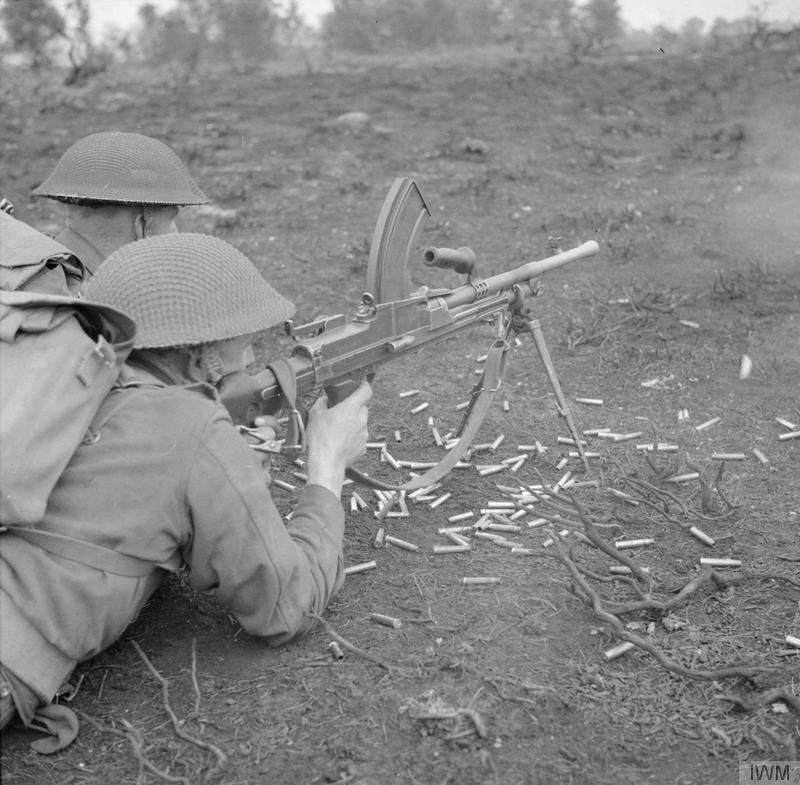
A Bren Gun team train at Eastern Command's Battle School, 1942.

During the winter of 1942–43, the army overhauled the training of recruits. The 76th Division, along with the 48th Infantry and 77th Infantry divisions, was changed from a "Lower Establishment" unit to a "Reserve Division". On 20 December, the division was renamed the 76th Infantry (Reserve) Division, becoming a training formation in the process. These three divisions were supplemented by a fourth training formation, the 80th Infantry (Reserve) Division, which was raised on 1 January 1943. The 76th Infantry (Reserve) Division was assigned to Eastern Command, and moved to Norwich. Soldiers who had completed their corps training, were sent to these training divisions. (Note: Having entered military service, a recruit was assigned to the General Service Corps. He would then undertake six weeks' training at a Primary Training Centre and take aptitude and intelligence tests. The recruit would then be posted to a Corps Training Centre that specialized in the arm of the service they were joining. For those who would be joining the infantry, corps training involved a further sixteen week course. For more specialized roles, such as signallers, it could be up to thirty weeks.) The soldiers were given five weeks of additional training at the section, platoon and company level, before undertaking a final three-day exercise. Troops would then be ready to be sent overseas to join other formations. Training was handled in this manner to relieve the "Higher Establishment" divisions from being milked for replacements for other units and to allow them to intensively train without the interruption of having to handle new recruits. For example, the 9th Battalion, Dorsetshire Regiment provided recruits to other battalions within the regiment as well as the Royal Norfolk Regiment. During this period, command of the division changed several times. On 21 December 1943, Ozanne was replaced by Major-General Colin Callander who in turn was replaced by Major-General John Utterson-Kelso on 13 March 1944.

On 30 June 1944, the 76th Infantry (Reserve) Division, along with the other training divisions, had a combined total of 22,355 men. Of this number, only 1,100 were immediately available as replacements for the 21st Army Group. (Note: The war establishment—the paper strength—of a "Higher Establishment" infantry division in 1944 was 18,347 men.) The remaining 21,255 men were considered ineligible for service abroad, due to a variety of reasons, ranging from medical, not being considered fully fit or not yet fully trained. Over the following six months, up to 75 per cent of these men would be deployed to reinforce the 21st Army Group, following the completion of their training and having met the required fitness levels. Stephen Hart comments that, by September, the 21st Army Group "had bled Home Forces dry of draftable riflemen", due to the losses suffered during the Normandy Campaign, leaving the army in Britain, with the exception of the 52nd (Lowland) Infantry Division, with just "young lads, old men, and the unfit". On 1 September 1944, the division was disbanded. Utterson-Kelso assumed command of the 47th Infantry (Reserve) Division, which took over the role of the 76th Division.

=== Deception ===
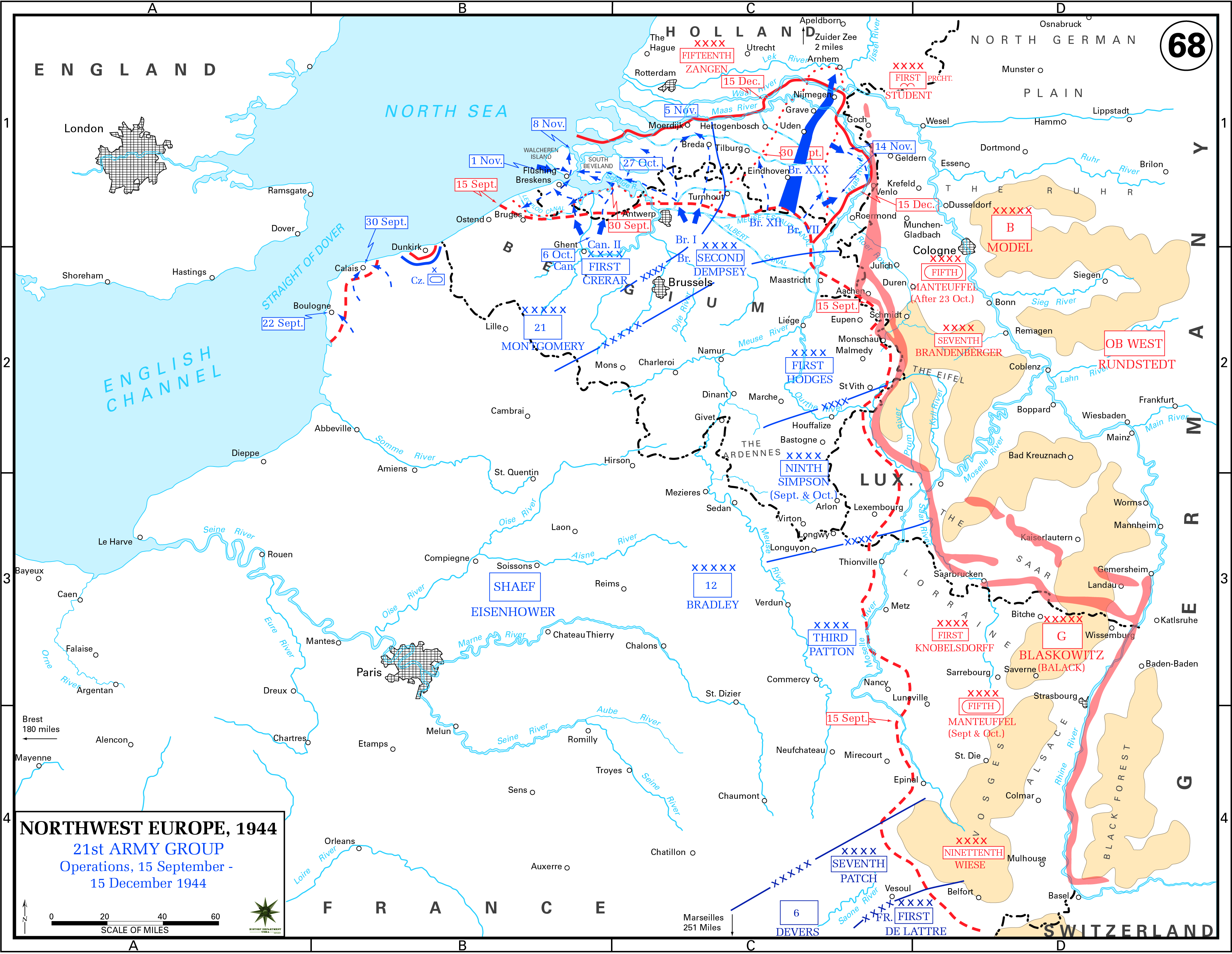
The front line, in North West Europe, following Operation Market Garden

The creation of the fictitious division arose from an actual reorganisation of British forces. During 1944, the British Army was facing a manpower crisis. The army did not have enough men to replace the losses to front line infantry. While efforts were made to address this (such as transferring men from the Royal Artillery and Royal Air Force to be retrained as infantry), the War Office began disbanding divisions to reduce the size of the army and to transfer the surplus men to other units to help keep those as close to full strength as possible. The 76th Infantry (Reserve) Division was one of several "Lower Establishment" divisions in the United Kingdom, chosen to be disbanded.

R Force, the Fortitude deception staff, seized upon this opportunity to retain the division as a phantom unit. A cover story was established to explain the change in the division's status. It was claimed that with the war nearing an end, several Territorial Army divisions would revert to their peacetime recruiting role and release their equipment and resources to other units. For the 76th, this was the 47th Division. With the transfer of equipment, the 76th was notionally raised to the "Higher Establishment" and assigned to reinforce the 21st Army Group.

As a deception unit, the division was assigned to the bogus Operation Trolleycar. Trolleycar was initially envisioned as a fictitious amphibious assault upon the coast of the Netherlands, by the phantom British Fourth Army, to exploit the success of the authentic Operation Market Garden. When the Battle of Arnhem failed, the notional invasion plan was temporarily scrapped. Trolleycar was revived to convince the Germans that the Fourth Army would land near Emden, in support of an imaginary assault by the First Canadian Army, that would be launched west of Arnhem and through the Netherlands. The deception effort was kept up until 1945, being wound down in January. Despite the British ceasing their attempts to deceive the Germans about this possible landing and the Germans not believing all that had been reported to them, the Germans remained anxious about a landing along the northern coast for the remainder of the war.

== General officers commanding ==
Appointed	General officer commanding
18 November 1941	Major-General William Ozanne
21 December 1943	Major-General Colin Callander
13 March 1944	Major-General John Utterson-Kelso

== Order of battle ==
76th Infantry Division (November 1941 - December 1942)
- 213th Infantry Brigade
  - 13th Battalion, Royal Warwickshire Regiment (until 12 September 1942)
  - 9th Battalion, Royal Berkshire Regiment (until 16 November 1943)
  - 14th Battalion, South Staffordshire Regiment
  - 7th Battalion, Royal Norfolk Regiment (between September and October 1942)
  - 7th Battalion, North Staffordshire Regiment (between September and October 1942)
- 220th Infantry Brigade
  - 7th Battalion, Royal Norfolk Regiment (until September 1942)
  - 9th Battalion, Royal Norfolk Regiment
  - 9th Battalion, Bedfordshire and Hertfordshire Regiment (until September 1942)
  - 1/5th Battalion, West Yorkshire Regiment (from September 1942)
  - 6th Battalion, Northamptonshire Regiment (from September 1942)
- 222nd Infantry Brigade
  - 8th Battalion, Lincolnshire Regiment
  - 8th Battalion, Leicestershire Regiment (Battalion was renamed the 1st Battalion in July 1942, and remained with the division until December 1942.)
  - 11th Battalion, Royal Scots Fusiliers (until September 1942)
  - 9th Battalion, Bedfordshire and Hertfordshire Regiment (between September and October 1942)
  - 4th Battalion, East Lancashire Regiment (from October 1942)
  - 16th Battalion, Sherwood Foresters (December 1942)

Divisional Troops

- 76th Infantry divisional artillery, Royal Artillery
  - 52nd (Manchester) Field Regiment (until August 1942)
  - 53rd (Bolton) Field Regiment (until June 1942)
  - 167th Field Regiment (from May 1942)
  - 56th (King's Own) Anti-Tank Regiment (until December 1941)
  - 100th (Gordon Highlanders) Anti-Tank Regiment (from January 1942, until November 1942)
- 76th Infantry Divisional Engineers, Royal Engineers
  - 591st (Antrim) Field Company (until December 1941)
  - 757th Field Company (from November 1941, until February 1942)
  - 556th Field Company (from December 1941)
  - 250th Field Company (from February 1942)
  - Divisional Field Stores Section (from December 1941)
- 76th Divisional Signals, Royal Corps of Signals
- 76th Independent Company, Reconnaissance Corps (joined from 54th Battalion, Reconnaissance Corps 15 January 1942, became 76th Independent Reconnaissance Squadron, 6 June 1942 (Note: In June 1942, the Reconnaissance Corps universally adopted cavalry nomenclature. As a result, all companies were redesignated as squadrons.))

76th Infantry (Reserve) Division (December 1942 - September 1944)
- 213th Infantry Brigade
  - 9th Battalion, Royal Berkshire Regiment (until 16 November 1943)
  - 9th Battalion, King's Own Scottish Borderers (until December 1943)
  - 11th Battalion, York and Lancaster Regiment (until November 1943)
  - 9th Battalion, Seaforth Highlanders (until November 1943)
  - 1st Battalion, Sherwood Foresters (from 15 November 1943)
  - 4th Battalion, East Lancashire Regiment (from 15 November 1943)
  - 7th Battalion, Border Regiment (from 15 November 1943)
  - 6th Battalion, Royal Sussex Regiment (from 30 July 1944)
  - 7th Battalion, Gloucestershire Regiment (from 3 August 1944)
- 220th Infantry Brigade
  - 1/5th Battalion, West Yorkshire Regiment (until January 1943)
  - 6th Battalion, Northamptonshire Regiment (until November 1943)
  - 18th Battalion, Welch Regiment (until November 1943)
  - 6th Battalion, King's Own Yorkshire Light Infantry (until October 1943)
  - 5th Battalion, West Yorkshire Regiment (from October 1943, until July 1944)
  - 9th (Caernarvonshire and Anglesey) Battalion, Royal Welch Fusiliers (from October 1943, until July 1944)
  - 2/6th Battalion, Lancashire Fusiliers (from October 1943, until July 1944)
  - 6th Battalion, King's Own Royal Regiment (from November 1943, until July 1944)
  - 8th Battalion, Suffolk Regiment (from July 1944)
  - 9th Battalion, Dorsetshire Regiment (from August 1944)
  - 6th Battalion, Devonshire Regiment (from August 1944)
- 222nd Infantry Brigade (brigade was disbanded on 18 November 1943)
  - 4th Battalion, East Lancashire Regiment (until November 1943)
  - 7th Battalion, Border Regiment (until November 1943)
  - 16th Battalion, Sherwood Foresters (December 1942)
  - 1st Battalion, Sherwood Foresters (from January 1943, until November 1943)

Divisional Troops

- 76th Infantry (Reserve) divisional artillery, Royal Artillery
  - 167th Field Regiment (until January 1943)
  - 173rd Field Regiment (from November 1943)
  - 56th (Highland) Medium Regiment (from January 1943)
  - 60th Heavy Regiment (from July 1943, until November 1943)
  - 94th Anti Tank Regiment (from January 1943, until November 1943)
- 76th Infantry (Reserve) divisional engineers, Royal Engineers
  - 556th Field Company (until January 1943)
  - 250th Field Company (until August 1944)
  - Divisional Field Stores Section (until August 1944)
- 76th Infantry (Reserve) Division Signal Regiment, Royal Corps of Signals
- 76th Independent Squadron, Reconnaissance Corps (transferred to 80th (Reserve) Division 6 January 1943.)

== See also ==
- List of British divisions in World War II

== Notes ==
Footnotes

Citations
