= St Alban's Church, Frant =

Church in Frant, East Sussex, England

Coordinates: 51°05′53″N 0°16′12″E

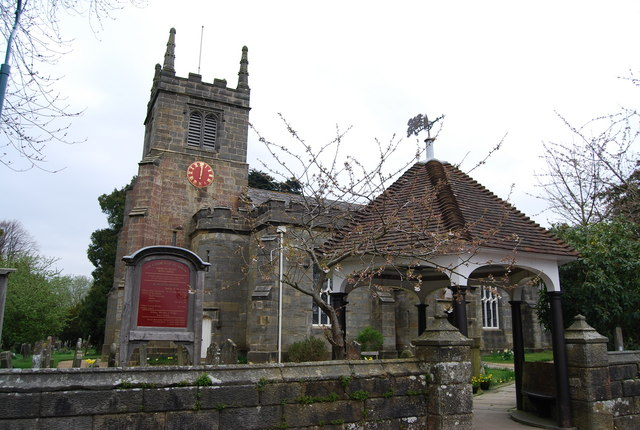
St Alban's Church, seen from the lych gate.

St Alban's Church is a Church of England parish church in Frant, East Sussex, England. It was built in 1819–22 in a fifteenth-century Gothic Revival style and is a grade II listed building.
