= Walter Barttelot (disambiguation) =

Sir Walter Barttelot, 1st Baronet (1820–1893) was a British politician.

Walter Barttelot may also refer to:

- Walter Barttelot (MP for Bramber) (1585–1641), English MP for Bramber, 1625
- Sir Walter Barttelot, 2nd Baronet (1855–1900)
- Sir Walter Barttelot, 3rd Baronet (1880–1918)

== See also ==
- Barttelot (surname)
