= Barttelot =

Barttelot is a surname. Notable people with the surname include:

- Barttelot baronets
- Walter Barttelot (1820–1893), British politician
- David Barttelot (1821–1852), English cricketer
- Brian Barttelot (1867–1942), British Royal Navy officer
