= Edith Sclater =

Dame Edith Sclater DBE
- Born: Edith Harriet Barttelot; 24 March 1856; Hilliers, Petworth, UK
- Died: 29 March 1927 (aged 71); Ovington Gardens, London
- Burial place: Four Elms, Kent, UK
- Organization(s): Lady Sclater's Work Room and Smokes Fund; Prisoners of War Packing Association; Soldiers' and Sailors' Families' Association; Salisbury Plain Pensions Committee
- Spouse: Sir Henry Crichton Sclater (1884–1923)
- Father: Sir Walter Barttelot
- Honours: Dame Commander of the Order of the British Empire

Dame Edith Harriet Sclater, Lady Sclater, DBE (née Barttelot; 24 March 1856 – 29 March 1927) was a British philanthropist.

== Early life and family ==
Sclater was born at Hilliers in Petworth into an ancient Sussex family. She was the second and eldest surviving daughter of Sir Walter Barttelot, who was created a baronet in 1875, and Harriet Musgrave, daughter of Rev. Sir Christopher Musgrave, 9th Baronet.

Edith's eldest brother, Walter, was killed during the Boer War and her second brother, Edmund, was killed in 1888 while part of the Emin Pasha Expedition in Central Africa. Further tragedy befell the family when her nephew was killed at Teheran in October 1918.

== First World War ==
During the First World War, she operated the Lady Sclater's Work Room and Smokes Fund, was president of the Salisbury branch of the Prisoners of War Packing Association, president of the Soldiers' and Sailors' Families' Association at Central Hackney as well as the Salisbury Plain Pensions Committee. For these efforts she was appointed a Dame Commander of the Order of the British Empire in the 1918 New Year Honours.

== Personal life ==
She married General Sir Henry Crichton Sclater, son of James Henry Sclater, on 12 June 1884. The union was childless.

Sir Henry Crichton Sclater died on 26 September 1923. She died on 29 March 1927 of heart failure following pneumonia at her Ovington Gardens home in London.

Her funeral took place on 2 April 1927 at Four Elms in Kent.

== See also ==
- Barttelot baronets
