= Sir Walter Barttelot, 3rd Baronet =

British Army officer and Baron (1880–1918)

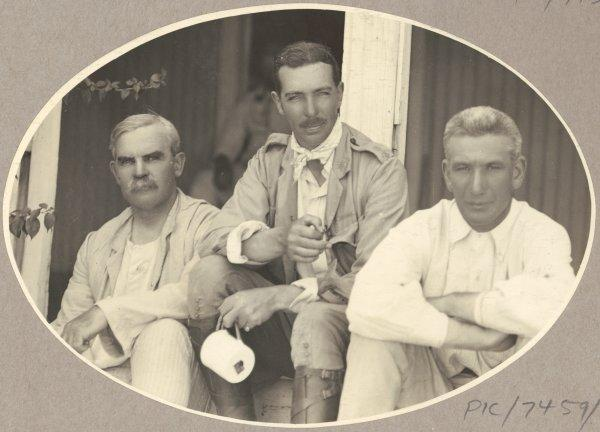
- From left: Minister Josiah Thomas, Sir Walter Balfour Barttelot and Administrator John Gilruth in 1912
- Born: 22 March 1880; Sidmouth, Devon, England
- Died: 23 October 1918 (aged 38); Tehran, Qajar Iran
- Military career
- Allegiance: United Kingdom
- Branch: British Army
- Rank: Brevet Lieutenant-Colonel; Major
- Units: Dorsetshire Regiment; Coldstream Guards
- Conflicts: Second Boer War; First World War: Western Front; Gallipoli campaign; Mesopotamian campaign

Sir Walter Balfour Barttelot, 3rd Baronet, DSO (22 March 1880 – 23 October 1918) was of the Barttelot Baronetcy and grandson of Sir Walter Barttelot, 1st Baronet. The Barttelots resided at "At Ford", in the parish of Stopham Sussex.

== Early life and military career ==
Barttelot was born at The Manor, Sidmouth on 22 March 1880. He was educated at Fonthill, East Grinstead and Eton College.

He then attended the Royal Military College, Sandhurst and was commissioned as a second lieutenant in the 2nd Battalion, Dorsetshire Regiment on 6 December 1899. The regiment was stationed in South Africa, so he was involved throughout the Second Boer War, part of the time he was an Aide de Camp to General Talbot Coke, and he also served as a staff officer to Colonel Williams, who commanded a Mounted Infantry Column. He succeeded to the title of 3rd Baronet Barttelot, on 23 July 1900, after his father, Sir Walter George Barttelot, 2nd Baronet, was killed in action during the Boer War. He transferred to the 1st Battalion, Coldstream Guards on 12 February 1901, returning to the United Kingdom with them in October 1902. The 3rd baronet received the Queen's South Africa Medal with six clasps and the King's South Africa Medal with two. He married Gladys St. Aubyn Angove, daughter of William Collier Angove, on 17 November 1903.

He was promoted to lieutenant on 9 November 1903, and to captain on 18 May 1910. He served in Egypt from 1906 to 1908, and from 27 June 1911 he was Aide de camp, and from 12 August 1913 to 14 October 1914, Military Secretary to Lord Denman the Governor-General of Australia.

=== First World War ===
With the outbreak of the First World War, Barttelot initially served in France with the 4th (Reserve) Battalion Coldstream Guards, from 12 August 1914, where he was wounded at the Battle of the Aisne and also awarded the French Croix de Guerre. He was then appointed a General Staff Officer, Grade III on 11 February 1915 and was concerned with coastal defence around Portland, and served in the ill-fated Gallipoli campaign from July 1915, where he was promoted major on 1 September 1915. He was appointed a brigade major on 11 January 1916, for the Mesopotamian campaign. He was appointed to the Distinguished Service Order (DSO) on 22 December 1916, and appointed GSO, Grade II from 11 September 1917. and was Military Attaché to Tehran from 17 March 1918 with temporary promotion to lieutenant-colonel whilst performing those duties. He was awarded a brevet promotion to lieutenant-colonel for his service in Mesopotamia on 3 June 1918, and was killed, (aged 38) on 23 October 1918 in Tehran, Persia and was buried in the Tehran War Cemetery. In addition to his DSO, he had also been Mentioned in Despatches four times.

He had come to know Gertrude Bell during his time in Tehran, and in a letter to her mother on 25 October 1918, she wrote:

A terrible tragedy has happened at Tehran [(Teheran)]. I think I must have written to you about the Military Attach‚, Sir Walter Barttelot, with whom I used to ride at Gulhak before breakfast. He was also our host on the night expedition into the hills which I described to you. He has been murdered in his bed by a jealous husband - I know no details but I profoundly believe that there was nothing in the whole business but wicked Tehran gossip. The wife in question, Mrs Maclaren, left Tehran a month ago and passed through here on her way to England. I didn't see her in Baghdad, partly because I was having influenza at the time and other partly because, though I had seen very little of her at Gulhak, I thought her Class B lady and had no special wish to renew the acquaintance. Also she had quarrelled with the Marlings, the wrong quite on her side, as far as I could see, and I didn't want to be mixed up in any dissensions. It's a truly shocking business. Sir Walter had a wife in England and a boy at Eton, about both of whom he used to talk to me continuously. He was a nice, pleasant, not particularly brilliant British landowner; we made rather friends, just because he was the sort of man I knew at home - at least that was my feeling about him. He was not well suited in his Tehran job and was longing to get away. I told the C.G.S. this when I came back, a successor was found for him, and he would have probably have been back in England before the end of the year. Oh dear, I'm so sorry for his wife and boy. Maclaren I thought a dreadful man - class W, if not Z. He is a consul.

== Family ==
Barttelot was survived by his wife and two sons. The eldest son, Sir Walter de Stopham Barttelot, 4th Baronet, was killed in action as a brigadier on 16 August 1944, in Normandy during Operation Overlord during the Second World War. Barttelot was commemorated with memorial services in Stopham Parish Church on 9 November 1918, and at Holy Trinity Brompton on 11 November. His widow remarried, to Commander N. W. Diggle CMG, Naval Attaché in Rome, on 30 April 1920.

Barttelot's brother, Lieutenant-Commander Nigel Kenneth Walter Barttelot, had been killed in the early days of World War I, whilst commanding the destroyer HMS Liberty during the Battle of Heligoland Bight.

== Legacy ==
Barttelot Road, in Horsham West Sussex, takes its name from the family.

Baronetage of the United Kingdom
Preceded by Sir Walter George Barttelot	Baronet (of Stopham); 1900–1918	Succeeded by Sir Walter de Stopham Barttelot
