= 2nd Sussex Rifle Volunteers =

2nd Sussex Rifle Volunteers 4th Bn, Royal Sussex Regiment 4th/5th (Cinque Ports) Bn, Royal Sussex Regiment
- Active: 2 December 1859–1 April 1967
- Country: United Kingdom
- Branch: Volunteer Force/Territorial Force
- Role: Infantry
- Size: 1–3 Battalions
- Part of: 53rd (Welsh) Division; 34th Division; 44th (Home Counties) Division; 12th (Eastern) Division; 10th Armoured Division
- Garrison/HQ: Worthing; Denne Road Drill Hall, Horsham
- Engagements: Second Boer War; First World War; Gallipoli Campaign; Battles of Gaza; Battle of Jerusalem; Battle of the Soissonnais and the Ourcq; Fifth Battle of Ypres; Second World War; Battle of France; Defence of Amiens; Battle of Alam el Halfa; Second Battle of El Alamein

Commanders
- Notable commanders: Sir Walter Barttelot, 1st Baronet; Sir Henry Fletcher, 4th Baronet; Henry Fitzalan-Howard, 15th Duke of Norfolk; Sir William Campion; Sir Lashmer Whistler

The 2nd Sussex Rifle Volunteers was a part-time unit of the British Army first raised from the county of Sussex in 1859. It later became the 4th Battalion, Royal Sussex Regiment. A detachment served in the Second Boer War. During the First World War, the battalion fought at Gallipoli, in Sinai and Palestine, and then in the final months of the war on the Western Front. In the Second World War, both the battalion and its duplicate served in the Battle of France and were evacuated from Dunkirk. The 4th Battalion then fought at the Second Battle of El Alamein, and served in the Middle East until the end of the war. It continued in the postwar Territorial Army until it lost its individual identity in a series of mergers from 1967.

== Volunteer Force ==
An invasion scare in 1859 led to the emergence of the Volunteer Movement, and Rifle Volunteer Corps (RVCs) began to be organised throughout Great Britain. A number of these were raised in Sussex, and three Administrative Battalions were formed in April 1860 to control these independent corps (other RVCs formed in the Cinque Ports of Sussex and Kent were organised in their own numerical sequence and admin battalions):

1st Administrative Battalion, Sussex Rifle Volunteer Corps

- Headquarters (HQ): Chichester, moving to Worthing in 1866
- 8th (Storrington) Sussex RVC, formed 16 February 1860 with Sir Charles Goring, 9th Baronet as captain, transferred to 2nd Sussex Admin Bn by beginning of 1861
- 9th (Arundel) Sussex RVC, formed 28 February 1860 with Henry Fitzalan-Howard, 14th Duke of Norfolk (died 25 November 1860) as captain
- 10th (Chichester) Sussex RVC, formed 1 March 1860 with George Green Nicholls, formerly lieutenant-colonel, 90th Foot, as captain
- 11th (Worthing) Sussex RVC, formed 10 March 1860
- 12th (Westbourne) Sussex RVC, formed 8 December 1860
- 15th (Bognor) Sussex RVC, formed 9 April 1860, disbanded 1865

2nd Administrative Battalion, Sussex Rifle Volunteer Corps

- HQ: Petworth, moving to Horsham in 1869
- 6th (Petworth) Sussex RVC, formed 15 February 1860 with Walter Barttelot Barttelot, formerly captain, 1st Dragoons, as captain-commandant
- 7th (Horsham) Sussex RVC, formed as 1st Sub-Division 1859, redesignated 2 April 1860
- 13th (Hurstpierpoint) Sussex RVC, formed 14 March 1860
- 14th (Crawley) Sussex RVC, formed 14 March 1860, disbanded 1863
- 18th (Henfield) Sussex RVC, formed 14 June 1860
- 20th (Billingshurst) Sussex RVC, formed January 1860, disbanded by December 1860 without any officers being appointed
- 8th (Storrington) Sussex RVC, transferred from 1st Sussex Admin Bn by beginning of 1861, disbanded 1876
- 5th (East Grinstead) Sussex RVC, transferred from 3rd Sussex Admin Bn 1863
- 2nd (Cuckfield) Sussex RVC, transferred from 1st Cinque Ports Admin Bn 1870

3rd Administrative Battalion, Sussex Rifle Volunteer Corps

- HQ: Brighton
- 1st (Brighton) Sussex RVC, formed as two companies 23 November 1859 with R. Molsom, formerly captain, Scots Fusilier Guards, as captain
- 2nd (Cuckfield) Sussex RVC, formed as two companies 2 December 1859
- 4th (Lewes) Sussex RVC, formed 25 January 1860
- 5th (East Grinstead) Sussex RVC, formed 9 February 1860, transferred to 2nd Sussex Admin Bn 1863
- 16th (Battle) Sussex RVC, formed 19 May 1860
- 19th (Eastbourne) Sussex RVC, formed 6 October 1860, disbanded 1868

No 3rd Sussex RVC appears to have been formed, but two others were raised:

- 17th (Etchingham) Sussex RVC, formed 4 June 1860, joined 5th Kent Admin Bn
- (New) 20th (Uckfield) Sussex RVC, formed 27 October 1870, joined 1st Cinque Ports Admin Bn

On 26 April 1860 George Nicholls (10th RVC) and Walter Barttelot (6th RVC) were promoted to major and R. Molsom (1st RVC) to lt-col, to command the 1st, 2nd and 3rd Admin Bns respectively; Barttelot was succeeded as captain-commandant of the 6th RVC on the same day by Edward Turnour, 4th Earl Winterton. The 3rd Sussex Admin Bn was broken up in 1863, by which time the 1st Sussex RVC had grown to six companies and became an independent unit, while the 5th (East Grinstead) transferred to the 2nd Admin Bn and the other RVCs of the 3rd Admin Bn transferred to the 1st Cinque Ports Admin Bn. The Very Rev Walter Hook, Dean of Chichester, was appointed honorary chaplain of the 1st Admin Bn on 13 August 1864.

Under the 'Localisation of the Forces' scheme introduced by the Cardwell Reforms of 1872, Volunteers were brigaded with their local Regular and Militia battalions. For the Sussex and Cinque Ports RVCs and Admin Bns this was in Sub-District No 43 in South Eastern District, grouped with the 35th (Royal Sussex) and 107th Regiments of Foot and the Royal Sussex Light Infantry Militia.

The 1st and 2nd Sussex Admin Bns were amalgamated in 1874 and consolidated as the 2nd Sussex RVC on 4 February 1880:

- HQ at Worthing

- A and B Companies at Cuckfield – from 2nd RVC
- C Company at East Grinstead – from 5th RVC
- D Company at Petworth – from 6th RVC
- E Company at Horsham – from 7th RVC
- F Company at Arundel – from 9th RVC
- G Company at Chichester – from 10th RVC
- H Company at Worthing – from 11th RVC
- I Company at Westbourne – from 12th RVC
- K Company at Hurstpierpoint – from 13th RVC
- L Company at Henfield – from 18th RVC

The officer corps of the unit was dominated by the most prominent political and landowning families of the county. Barttelot was elected MP for West Sussex in 1860, and was created a baronet in 1875. He continued to command the battalion until he became its Honorary Colonel in 1882. His son Walter George Barttelot, formerly of the 5th Dragoon Guards and Royal 1st Devon Yeomanry, became a captain in the battalion on 13 March 1886. The elder Barttelot was succeeded in the command by Sir Henry Fletcher, 4th Baronet, former lieutenant in the Grenadier Guards who had been appointed a supernumerary lt-col in the battalion on 6 May 1874. Fletcher was elected MP for Horsham in 1880. Henry Fitzalan-Howard, 15th Duke of Norfolk, who had become captain of his father's old 9th (Arundel) RVC on 5 April 1871, was promoted to major in the 2nd Sussex on 4 March 1882. Another family long associated with the unit was the Campions of Danny House, near Hurstpierpoint: William Henry Campion, formerly captain in the 53rd Foot, who had fought in the Crimean War and Indian Mutiny, with the 72nd Highlanders, was appointed major on 30 April 1873, and succeeded Fletcher as lt-col on 27 January 1897.

== Royal Sussex Regiment ==
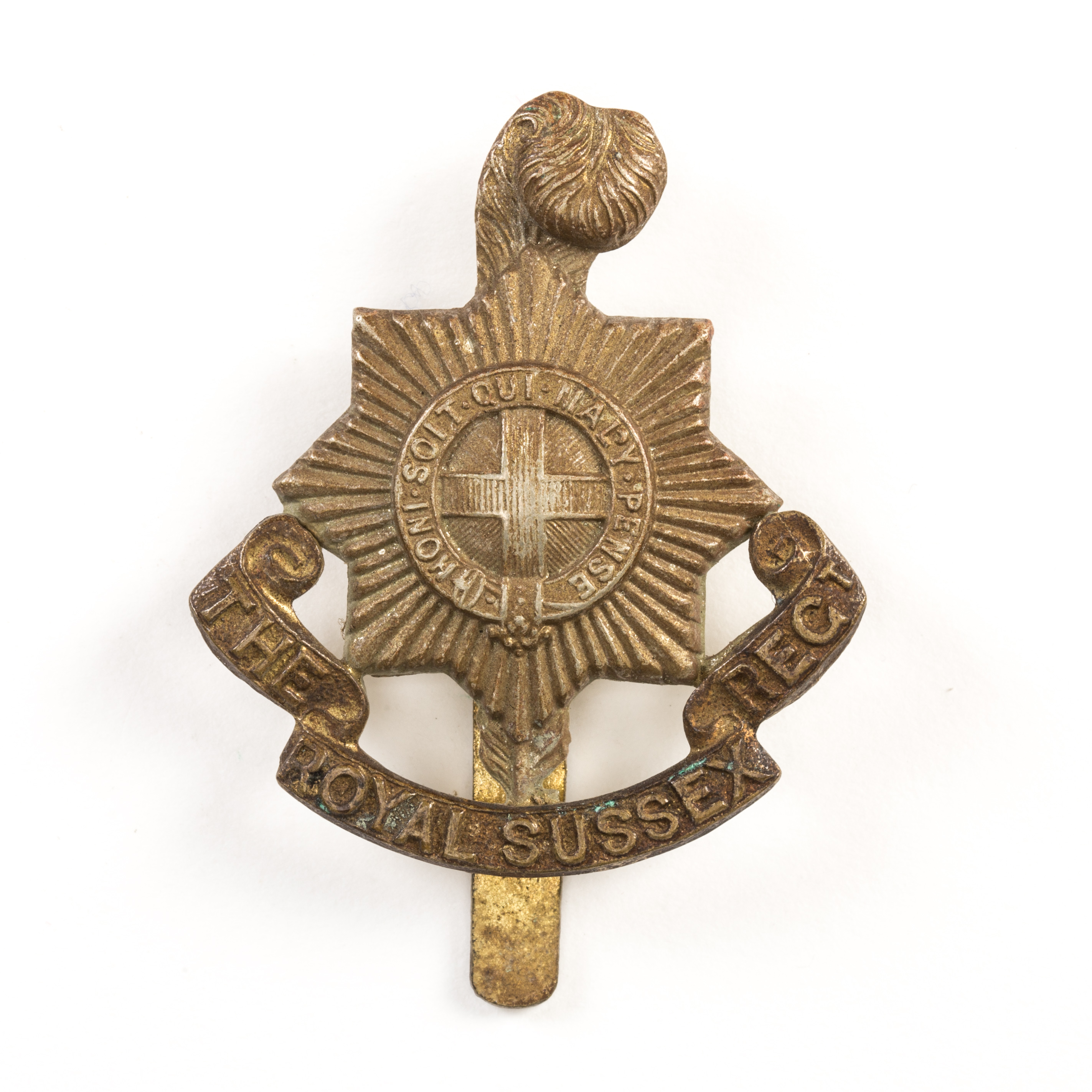
Cap badge of the Royal Sussex Regiment.

The Childers Reforms of 1881 took Cardwell's reforms further, the linked battalions becoming county regiments to which the Volunteers were formally affiliated. The 35th and 107th became the Royal Sussex Regiment on 1 July 1881, the 2nd Sussex RVC becoming its 2nd Volunteer Battalion (VB), but without changing its title until February 1887.

While Cardwell's sub-districts were often referred to as 'brigades', they were purely administrative organisations and the Volunteers were excluded from the 'mobilisation' part of the scheme. The Stanhope Memorandum of December 1888 proposed a more comprehensive Mobilisation Scheme for Volunteer units, which would assemble in their own brigades at key points in case of war. In peacetime these brigades provided a structure for collective training. Under this scheme the 2nd Sussex formed part of the Dover Brigade, later entitled the South Eastern Brigade, before the Royal Sussex VBs formed their own Sussex Brigade at the end of the 1890s. This became the Sussex and Kent Brigade in the early 1900s, with its HQ at St Elmo, Worthing. Colonel Sir Henry Aubrey-Fletcher commanded this brigade from 1897 to 1904

=== Second Boer War ===
After Black Week in December 1899, the Volunteers were invited to send active service units to assist the regulars in the Second Boer War. The War Office decided that one company 116 strong could be recruited from the volunteer battalions of any infantry regiment that had a regular battalion serving in South Africa. The Royal Sussex's VBs accordingly raised a service company, to which the 2nd VB contributed 80 or more volunteers under Maj the Duke of Norfolk and Capt Sir Walter Barttelot, 2nd Baronet (the Duke transferred to 69th (Sussex) Company, Imperial Yeomanry). The service company joined 1st Bn Royal Sussex and saw action at Welkom Farm, Zand River, Doornkop, Johannesburg, Pretoria and Diamond Hill. Sir Walter Barttelot was killed leading his men at Retief's Nek on 23 July 1900. The service company was in South Africa for a year, and was replaced by two further companies from the VBs as the war continued. These companies earned the Royal Sussex VBs their first Battle honour: South Africa 1900–02.

There was a general expansion of the Volunteers during the Boer War, and the 2nd VB increased to 12 companies in 1900. In addition, three school Cadet Corps were affiliated to the battalion: St John's College, Hurstpierpoint, since 1887, Lancing College, Shoreham-by-Sea, from 1900 and Ardingly College, Hayward's Heath, from 1902. Rev Henry Southwell, VD, later a canon of Chichester Cathedral, was appointed one of the battalion's chaplains on 9 April 1904.

After the Boer War, a Royal Commission on Militia and Volunteers was established in 1903, chaired by the Duke of Norfolk, who had been promoted to lt-col commandant of the 2nd VB on 24 December 1902. The commission attempted to define the role of the auxiliary forces, and made detailed proposals on how their deficiencies in training and equipment could be addressed. Norfolk's commission proposed a Home Defence Army raised by conscription, which was unpopular with the Volunteers and Yeomanry, and was quickly shelved.

== Territorial Force ==
However, in conjunction with the Elgin Commission on the War in South Africa, the Norfolk Commission's work influenced the creation of the Territorial Force (TF) under the 1908 Haldane Reforms, which subsumed the Volunteer Force. Under the TF the 2nd VB became the 4th Battalion, Royal Sussex Regiment (not to be confused with the 4th (Royal Sussex Militia) Bn that existed between 1881 and 1890). HQ moved from its old location at Teville Road, Worthing, to the Drill Hall at Park Street, Horsham, before the outbreak of the First World War. The battalion was distributed as follows:

- A Company at Drill Hall, Market Place, Hayward's Heath
- B Company at Drill Hall, High Street, Hurstpierpoint, with detachments at Burgess Hill and Henfield
- C Company at De La Warr Road, East Grinstead, with detachments at Crawley and Forest Row
- D Company at Midhurst Road, Petworth, with a detachment at Northchapel
- E Company at Horsham, with a detachment at Warnham
- F Company at Graystock Terrace, Arundel, with detachments at Ashington and Storrington
- G Company at Drill Hall, Priory Park, Chichester, with detachments at the Drill Hall, Bedford Street, Bognor and at Eastergate
- H Company at Bath Place, Worthing

The three school cadet corps joined the Officers' Training Corps, but Brighton College Preparatory School Cadet Corps was transferred to the battalion from 1st Volunteer Bn.

The two TF battalions of the Royal Sussex (4th and 5th) were not included in the Home Counties Division, but were attached to it as 'Army Troops'.

== First World War ==
=== Mobilisation ===
On the declaration of war 4th Royal Sussex mobilised at Horsham on 4 August 1914 under Lt-Col E.H.J.D. Mostyn, VD, who had been promoted to command the battalion on 13 May 1913 following the retirement of the Duke of Norfolk after 42 years' service to the battalion. The senior captain (honorary major) was William Campion, son of the honorary colonel and MP for Lewes. Chaplain 1st Class Canon Southwell was still the senior chaplain attached to the battalion, and went on to a distinguished career during the war.

TF units and formations were invited to volunteer for Overseas Service, and on 15 August 1914, the War Office issued instructions to separate those men who had signed up for Home Service only, and form these into reserve units. On 31 August, the formation of a reserve or 2nd Line unit was authorised for each 1st Line unit where 60 per cent or more of the men had volunteered for Overseas Service. The titles of these 2nd Line units would be the same as the original, but distinguished by a '2/' prefix. In this way duplicate battalions, brigades and divisions were created, mirroring those TF formations being sent overseas. Later 3rd Line units were formed to train reinforcements for the others.

In September the Home Counties Division began to send battalions to Gibraltar to relieve the Regular garrison for active service with the British Expeditionary Force (BEF) on the Western Front. Then at the end of October the whole division went to India to replace the Regulars. However the attached Royal Sussex battalions remained in England.

=== 1/4th Battalion ===
Eventually 1/4th Royal Sussex was assigned to 53rd (Welsh) Division. This division had also sent a number of its units overseas, and now that it was being prepared for service its Welsh Border Brigade was reformed as 160th Brigade comprising 1/4th Sussex and three composite battalions made up of companies from various 2nd Line Home Counties battalions. The battalion, now commanded by Lt-Col William Campion, with his brother the Rev Frederick Campion as chaplain, joined at Cambridge on 24 April 1915, moving to Bedford the following month to continue its training.

On 2 July the division was ordered to refit for service in the Mediterranean, where it was destined as reinforcements for the Gallipoli Campaign. The battalion boarded two trains on 16 July for Devonport Dockyard, where it embarked on the transport Ulysses next day, with a strength of 29 officers and 969 other ranks (ORs).

==== Gallipoli ====
The battalion arrived at Alexandria on 28 July and moved to Port Said. It then sailed for Lemnos and landed on C Beach at Suvla Bay on the night of 8/9 August. After spending the night on the beach it was sent to dig a trench, following which it went into divisional reserve. 1/4th Sussex was then sent to come under the orders of 33rd Bde of 11th (Northern) Division. This entailed crossing the open ground south of the Salt Lake under shellfire. It reported to 33rd Bde about 12.15, and at 13.00 it was ordered up to support the left of 33rd Bde's attack on Scimitar Hill, which was falling back. The Official History records that the orders given to Lt-Col Campion 'were vague in the extreme. The colonel was verbally told "to restore the line". No one knew where it was, but he was told that "if he went in that direction (pointing to a column of smoke from the burning scrub) he ought to find the 2/4th Queen's".' The 1/4th Sussex advanced steadily in extended order, every man with an extra 100 rounds of ammunition and the rear company carrying entrenching tools. By chance it found the 2/4th Queen's lining a ditch, having been driven off the crest, and came in on its northern flank. This forward position was untenable because of the burning scrubland and enfilade fire from the right flank, so the battalion fell back and consolidated a line of old Turkish trenches facing Scimitar Hill. In its first action the battalion had suffered casualties amounting to 1 officer and 11 ORs killed, 3 officers and 60 ORs wounded and missing. This, together with scattering, left the battalion with a frontline fighting strength of just 250.

The battalion held this trench next day while other formations tried to attack, then was relieved on 11 August, returning to the beach next day. It then worked on trenches until 22 August when two companies went up into the line. The whole battalion went to the rest camp at the end of the month. It returned to the front line from 6 to 12 September, where it came under constant sniper fire and fought off a Turkish bombing attack on 11 September. Another trench tour from 16 to 19 September saw less sniping but heavy enemy shellfire. 160th Bde was then sent to the Lala Baba area to prepare defences for the beachhead and winter quarters for the troops. The Sussex men named one dangerous gully 'Devil's Dyke' after a well-known landmark on the Sussex Downs.

Trench warfare and sickness took a constant toll of the battalion. It received a draft of one officer and 175 men from home in August and another officer and 24 men in early September, but by 20 October its strength was down to 17 officers and 197 ORs. Among those evacuated sick was Lt-Col Campion on 5 October, when Maj Beale took over temporary command. However, on 21 October the battalion was temporarily amalgamated with 2/4th Queen's. (Lieutenant-Col Campion went home, where he later commanded 15th (Reserve) Bn Royal Fusiliers in the UK and then went to France to command 6th (Service) Bn Bedfordshire Regiment and 17th (Garrison) Bn Royal Sussex on the Western Front before returning to 1/4th Royal Sussex in 1918, see below.).

By mid-December the decision had been made to shut down the Suvla front, and 53rd (W) Division began to be evacuated. 160th Brigade was the last to go, on 13 December, transported from South Pier to Mudros Harbour. There the battalion boarded HM Transport Haverford and was taken to Alexandria, where it disembarked on 19 December and Lt-Col Ashworth from England took over command.

==== Egypt ====
53rd (Welsh) Division began a long period of rest and recuperation guarding the Nile Valley in Egypt. The battalion (now simply the 4th Royal Sussex, since the 2/4th and 3/4th Bns had disappeared, see below) slowly regained its fitness from regular route marches, and strength from the receipt of several reinforcement drafts from home. It spent June working on defences along the Suez Canal, based at Ferry Post. When the Turks attacked the defences from Sinai in August 1916, leading to the Battle of Romani, only part of 53rd Division was actually engaged. The 4th Royal Sussex was brought up by train but saw no action; nevertheless it was later awarded the battle honours Rumani and Egypt 1915–1917. It then resumed its training.

The Egyptian Expeditionary Force (EEF) began its own advance across Sinai to launch the Sinai and Palestine Campaign in December 1916, and 4th Royal Sussex marched into the new base at el Arish on 3 February.

==== Gaza ====
In March 1917 the EEF advanced towards Gaza, with 53rd (W) Division in the Desert Column. The First Battle of Gaza began at 03.30 on 26 March, when 160th Bde advanced to cross Wadi Ghazzee, led by 4th Royal Sussex, which began crossing at 03.45. Shortly afterwards, fog rolled in from the sea, slowing the advance, but the brigade pushed on to Esh Sheluf ahead of schedule and 4th Royal Sussex secured the most prominent knoll on the Es Sire Ridge by 05.10. There was then a delay before the attack began shortly after 11.45. 160th Brigade immediately came under shrapnel fire but advanced rapidly with 4th Royal Sussex on the right. By 13.30 the brigade had captured 'The Labyrinth', a maze of entrenched gardens, but now the battalion, advancing up the centre of the Es Sire Ridge, suffered heavy casualties, lost its commanding officer (Lt-Col Ashworth) killed, and fell back in some disorder from the crest. At 16.00, reinforced from the reserve, the battalion advanced again and by 18.30 the whole position had been secured and the Turks were running back into Gaza. But events had not gone so well elsewhere, and 53rd (W) Division was ordered to pull back. It was then ordered to reoccupy the ridge, then finally withdrawn again. By 28 March it was back on its starting position behind Wadi Ghazzee. 4th Royal Sussex had lost four officers and 24 ORs killed, 11 officers and 154 ORs wounded, and 59 ORs missing.

A second attempt to take Gaza began on 17 April, and 53rd (W) Division attacked up the coast road in the second phase on 19 April. The objective for 160th Brigade was Samson Ridge, 4th Royal Sussex advancing in support of 2/10th Middlesex Regiment, who became pinned down about 300 yards (270 m) short of the Turkish redoubt at the top. Just before midday, A and C Companies were sent up to join 2/10th Middlesex's successful assault on the redoubt. The rest of the 4th Sussex came up and began consolidating the position taken. The attack elsewhere had failed and 53rd (W) Division could advance no further. 4th Royal Sussex was relieved that night, having lost 15 ORs killed and one officer and 50 ORs wounded.

There followed a pause of several months while the EEF was reorganised. The battalion took its turns of duty in the 'Dumbbell Hill' and 'Fusilier Ridge' trenches facing Gaza, and carried out training when out of the line. By 1 October it had been reinforced by drafts from home and men returning from hospital to a strength of 27 officers and 984 ORs. In preparation for the Third Battle of Gaza 53rd (W) Division was moved inland and 4th Sussex took up outpost positions along Wadi Hanafish on 26 October without encountering the enemy. There it dug in while the battle began on 28 October. After the Desert Mounted Corps had outflanked the Gaza–Beersheba line, 4th Royal Sussex crossed the wadi on 31 October and marched with 160th Bde through Beersheba next day. On 3 November 53rd (W) Division was sent to take the heights of Tel el Khuweilfe, 4th Royal Sussex supporting 2/4th Queen's, which made the attack. The day was hot, and the troops suffered greatly from thirst as they laboured over the rough ground while the enemy held the high ground and the water supplies. After sunset a patrol of 4th Royal Sussex got round the enemy and approached the wells before returning. Next morning the battalion withdrew a little to allow the artillery to bombard the Turkish positions, then attacked with B and D Companies forming the firing line, supported by overhead fire from artillery and machine guns. 4th Royal Sussex captured the high ground but was unable to advance further because of enfilading machine gun fire. Finally some food and water were got up to the troops. Two days later (6 November) the battalion advanced again behind a Creeping barrage under command of 158th (North Wales) Bde. The first line of hills was captured with minimal opposition (20 prisoners were taken), but the next line had to be stormed with the bayonet by three companies. 158th Brigade then consolidated the position and drove off several counter-attacks during the day. 53rd (W) Division was preparing to renew its attack on Tel el Khuweilfe when the Turks began to withdraw.

==== Jerusalem ====
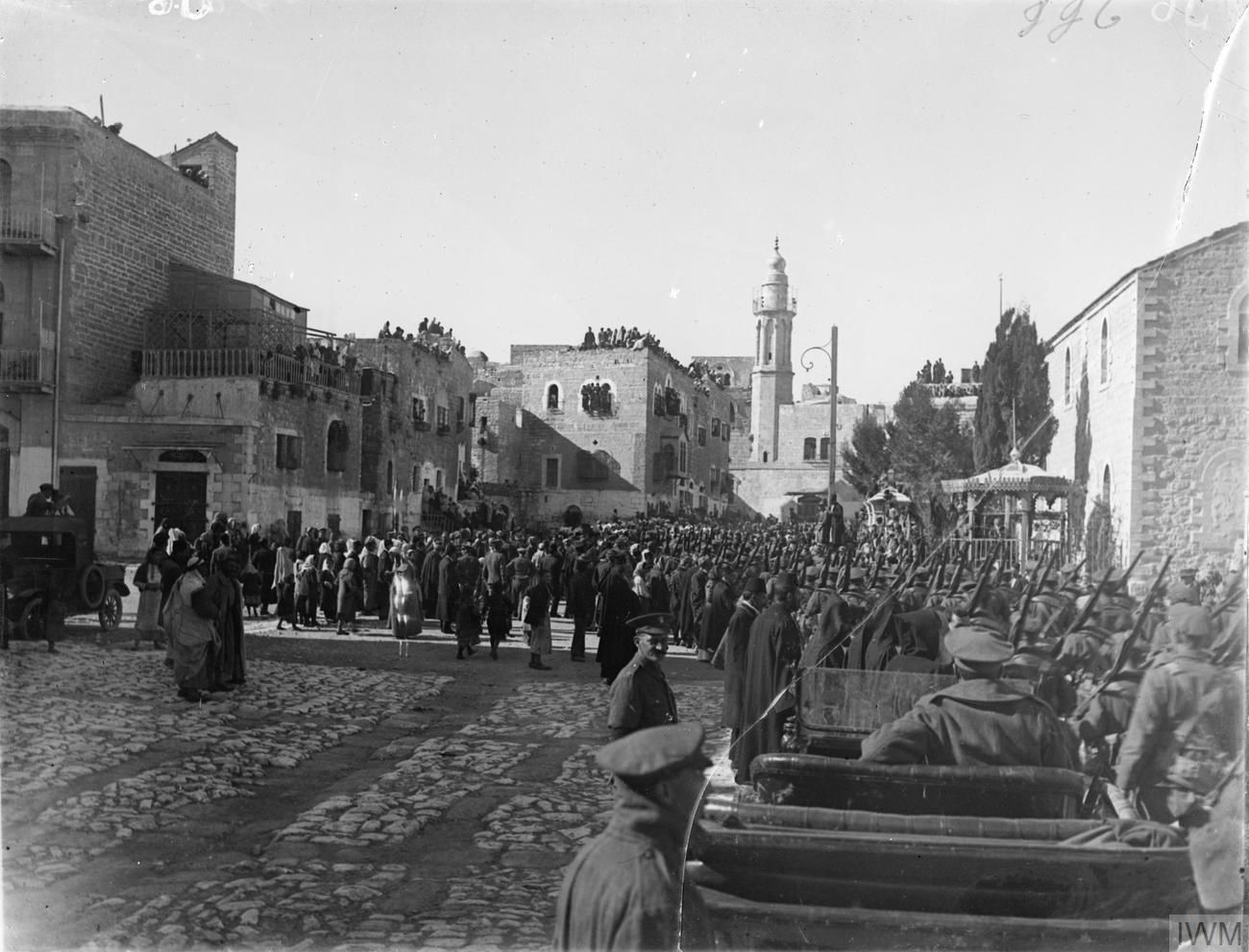
4th Royal Sussex marching through Bethlehem on 9 December 1917.

From 9 to 22 November the battalion was holding an outpost line, and then was withdrawn for rest and training while the rest of the EEF pushed the defeated Turks back towards Jerusalem. At the beginning of December 53rd (W) Division rejoined the fighting, advancing up the Hebron road through the Judean Hills in fog and rain to threaten Jerusalem from the south. Jerusalem fell on 9 December, the advance guard of 53rd (W) Division entering the city that day. Next day 4th Royal Sussex were sent to Bethlehem to protect the telephone line that was continually being cut. The companies were spread along the line in bivouacs and patrolled constantly. The rest of the division pushed on towards Jericho. After taking over positions on the Mount of Olives and then at Abu Dis, 4th Royal Sussex made an attack on 17 December. A and B Companies advanced under and artillery barrage took the objectives of 'Scrag Hill' and 'Sussex Ridge', which the battalion consolidated and held until 27 December when it was relieved.

The Turks counter-attacked on 27 December with the intention of recapturing Jerusalem. 4th Royal Sussex had to send three companies up next day to support 2/10th Middlesex, who were under attack at Deir Ibn Obeid, and then covered their withdrawal. However the Turkish counter-offensive failed, and they were seen to be retiring. The battalion was relieved in the outpost line on 1 January and went into divisional reserve at Ramallah until 12 January when it returned to the line, which was quiet. From 20 January to the end of February the battalion was alternately working on road repairs and holding the line, occasionally taking another small piece of territory without serious opposition. On 8 March 1918, 53rd (W) Division was ordered to capture Tell 'Asur, which led to several days of heavy fighting; once again 4th Royal Sussex were not engaged but used to repair the road to Tell 'Asur. The battalion made a small advance against weak opposition on 11 March, but a more serious attack that afternoon was cancelled, and 4th Royal Sussex returned to bivouacs on the Mount of Olives. It was back in the line on 19 March, driving off a Turkish attack on 22 March, and continued to take turns through April and May, usually holding three defended localities.

==== Western Front ====
The success of the German Spring Offensive on the Western Front led the British Expeditionary Force (BEF) to demand urgent reinforcements from Palestine. 4th Sussex left 53rd (W) Division on 30 May 1918 and travelled by road and train to Kantara in Egypt, where it was brought up to full strength with drafts. On 17 June it embarked on the transport Malwa and after landing at Taranto in Italy it proceeded by rail to Proven in Flanders. On arrival on 30 June it joined 101st Brigade in 34th Division.

34th Division had been virtually destroyed in the Spring battles, and was being reconstituted with battalions from Palestine. As soon as this was complete it was sent to reinforce the French sector of the front. When the Germans launched the last effort of their Spring Offensive on 15 July (the Second Battle of the Marne), the division was diverted and by the evening of 18 July was concentrated round Senlis. The infantry were moved up by lorry and by 03.00 on 23 July had completed the relief of a French division in the front line. Next day the 34th Division joined in the French counter-attack (the Battle of the Soissonnais and the Ourcq); 4th Royal Sussex was in brigade reserve in a wood and immediately came under German shellfire and began suffering casualties.

On 29 July the division attacked again to capture Beugneux Ridge. 4th Royal Sussex was assembled along the railway line and began its advance on a two-company front behind a creeping barrage at 04.10. The battalion pushed forward through a German defensive barrage that included Tear gas, and had progressed over a mile by 06.00, when a halt was made on the Green Line. But when the battalion resumed the attack, the morning fog had lifted and it was stopped in the wood by machine gun fire. Communication problems meant that supporting French artillery fire could not be called down, but the wood was stormed with the bayonet. The battalion had lost 4 officers and 42 ORs killed and died of wounds, 4 officers and 125 ORs wounded, and 29 ORs missing. The attack was renewed on 1 August, 4th Royal Sussex once again in the lead, though now weak in numbers and obliged to put in three companies to complete the first line. Nevertheless, the attack launched in fog and smoke at 04.49 had achieved its objectives by 06.00 as the Germans retired in disorder. The battalion lost another 41 ORs killed, wounded and missing. After the battle, the division entrained to return to the British front.

Lt-Col Campion's command, 6th (S) Bn Bedfords, having been disbanded, he was free to return to the 4th Royal Sussex, and resumed command of the battalion on 14 August.

==== Hundred Days Offensive ====
4th Royal Sussex spent the rest of August in training, while the Allies began their final Hundred Days Offensive. 34th Division was in Second Army, which followed up when the Germans withdrew from Mont Kemmel on 31 August. Next day 4th Royal Sussex led for 101st Bde, and on 4 September it supported 102nd Bde which had taken the lead. It then alternated in holding the new line until 23 September. That night, the battalion intelligence officer, Lt P.W. Lovering, led a patrol onto the Messines Ridge and into Spanbroekmolen Crater (a relic of the 1917 battle), which he found poorly guarded. On the night of 25 September the battalion occupied both that crater and Peckham Crater without opposition, and then consolidated the line.

34th Division attacked on the first day of the Fifth Battle of Ypres on 28 September. The attack consisted of pushing forward strong patrols protected by barrages. In the evening, 4th Royal Sussex pushed up the Wytschaete Ridge to within 10 yards (9.1 m) of German positions, despite the darkness and ground devastated in earlier battles. Next morning the battalion advanced at 05.30, encountering little opposition, swept through Wytschaete, and reached Oosttaverne by 08.40, after which the follow-up battalions advanced to the Ypres–Comines Canal.

The division then went into reserve, with 4th Royal Sussex bivouacked beside the canal until it took over the front line on 7 October. On 12 October two platoons from the regiment carried out a raid on a pillbox 300 yards (270 m) in front of the lines, and took a prisoner for identification without losing a casualty. The battalion pushed up towards the River Lys on 15 October, and when the Battle of Courtrai was launched on 16 October, it crossed the river by a footbridge without opposition at dusk. 101st Brigade was in divisional reserve during the next attacks, and the whole division was withdrawn into reserve on 1 November. It was still refitting and training when the Armistice with Germany came into force on 11 November.

34th Division began to move forward on 14 November, reaching the Dendre on 18 November. It was selected to form part of the Army of Occupation in Germany, and continued to carry out light training, although 'pivotal men' were demobilised. Between 12 and 19 December it advanced to the area south-west of Namur, where it was billeted. On 17 January 1919 it entrained for the Rhine and by 29 January it completed taking over its sector of the Cologne Bridgehead. On 15 March 34th Division was renamed Eastern Division in British Army of the Rhine, and its infantry battalions began to be replaced by Regular units. The 4th Royal Sussex was disembodied at Horsham on 20 October 1919.

==== Commanding officers ====
The following officers commanded 1/4th Bn during its active service:

- Lt-Col William Campion, to 5 October 1915 (evacuated sick) and again from 14 August 1918
- Maj S.W. Beale, acting from 5 to 26 October 1915, from 26 March to 14 April 1917, and again 26–29 March 1918
- Maj R.J. Few (2/4th Queen's), acting from 26 October to 23 December 1915
- Lt-Col H.S. Ashworth from 23 December 1915; killed at 1st Gaza 26 March 1917
- Lt-Col T.M. Bridges from 14 April 1917 to 5 June 1918
- Maj G.S. Constable acting from 5 June to 29 July 1918, and as acting Lt-Col from 4 to 14 August 1918
- Capt R.C.G. Middleton, acting from 29 July to 4 August 1918

=== 2/4th and 3/4th Battalions ===
The 2/4th Battalion was formed at Horsham on 29 January 1915, followed by the 3/4th Bn on 17 March. However, there was no role for the 2/4th in the 2nd Home Counties Division, so only one reserve battalion was required to supply drafts to the 1/4th Bn. On 7 September 1915 the 2/4th was absorbed into the 3/4th Bn, which changed its title to 2/4th. In line with other 3rd Line battalions it was redesignated 4th (Reserve) Bn on 8 April 1916, when it was probably at Cambridge. On 1 September 1916 it absorbed 5th (Reserve) Bn (formerly 2/5th (Cinque Ports) Bn) and 3/6th (Cyclist) Bn of the Royal Sussex in the Home Counties Reserve Brigade at Tunbridge Wells. After the war it was disbanded on 5 May 1919 at Horsham.

=== 15th Battalion ===
After the 3rd Line TF battalions were formed the remaining Home Service and unfit men were separated in May 1915 to form brigades of Coast Defence Battalions (termed Provisional Battalions from June 1915). The men from the 4th and 5th Royal Sussex were formed into 72nd Provisional Battalion. The Military Service Act 1916 swept away the Home/Foreign service distinction, and all TF soldiers became liable for overseas service, if medically fit. Part of these units' role was now physical conditioning to render men fit for drafting overseas. The Provisional Brigades thus became anomalous, and on 1 January 1917 the remaining battalions became numbered battalions of their parent units. 72nd Provisional Bn had disappeared, probably absorbed into 70th Provisional Bn (originally formed from the men of 5th and 6th Bns, East Surrey Regiment), which now became 15th Battalion, Royal Sussex. 70th Provisional Bn had been at Burnham-on-Sea as part of 8th Provisional Bde when that brigade was expanded into 72nd Division in November 1916. The battalion joined 215th Bde. The division moved from Somerset to Eastern England, and 15th Sussex was stationed at Bedford by January 1917 and at Ipswich by May. Early in 1918, 72nd Division began to be broken up: 15th Sussex moved to Cambridge where it was disbanded (sources give various dates between 28 March and 19 August 1918).

== Interwar ==
The TF was reconstituted on 7 February 1920 and reorganised as the Territorial Army (TA) the following year. The 4th Royal Sussex reformed at Park Street, Horsham, still commanded by Lt-Col William Campion, DSO, MP, with his father as Hon Col. In 1924 Lt-Col Campion was appointed Governor of Western Australia. The battalion was now in 132nd (Middlesex and Sussex) Brigade in the TA's 44th (Home Counties) Division, but had changed to 133rd (Kent and Sussex) Brigade by the late 1930s.

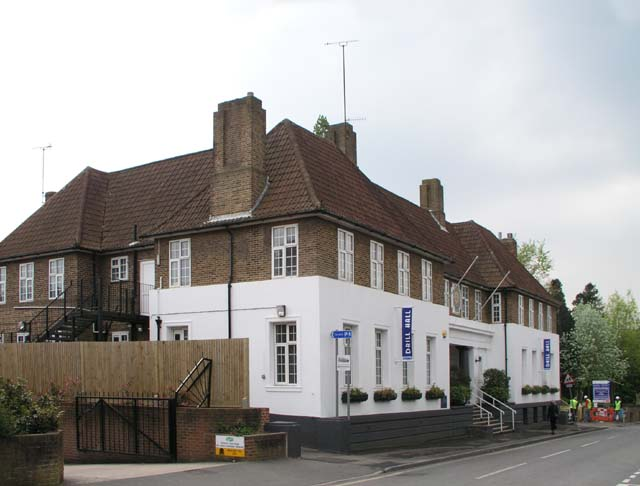
4th Royal Sussex's new drill hall, in Denne Road, Horsham, opened in 1927.

The battalion built a new drill hall in Denne Road, Horsham, designed by the then CO, Lt-Col C.B.R. Godman, who was a partner in the local architects Godman & Kay. It was opened in 1927.

A number of cadet corps were affiliated to the battalion:

- Brighton, Hove and Sussex Grammar School
- Midhurst Grammar School
- Ovingdean Hall School
- Shoreham Grammar School
- Warren Farm School
- West Hoathly Cadet Company

Among the new generation of officers commissioned into the battalion was Bernard Fitzalan-Howard, 16th Duke of Norfolk, a former lieutenant in the Royal Horse Guards.

After the Munich Crisis the TA was rapidly doubled in size, with most units forming duplicates. This time the duplicate of the 4th Bn, formed at Horsham on 17 May 1939, was designated 6th Battalion, Royal Sussex Regiment, re-using the number of the former 6th (Cyclist) Bn that had been disbanded after the war.

== Second World War ==
=== Mobilisation ===
The TA was mobilised on 1 September 1939. Next day 4th Royal Sussex and 133rd Bde HQ formed 'HQ Western Sub-Area' to handle mobilisation; war was declared on 3 September. 44th (Home Counties) Division was still in the process of organising its duplicate formation, the 12th (Eastern) Division: 6th Royal Sussex was assigned to 37th Brigade, the duplicate of 133rd. The two formations began their separate existence on 7 October 1939.

=== 4th Battalion ===
==== Battle of France ====
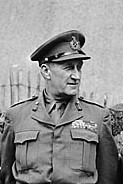
Sir Lashmer 'Bolo' Whistler, later in his career.

At first the battalion was employed guarding vulnerable points in England. On 3 February 1940 it came under the command of Lt-Col Lashmer Whistler, a Regular officer who had been commanding the Royal Sussex's Depot at Chichester; Maj the Duke of Norfolk commanded HQ Company. 4th Battalion was at Longburton in Dorset when the order came on 2 April 1940 to entrain for Southampton. There it embarked on the steam packet Ben-my-Chree to join the new British Expeditionary Force. It landed at Cherbourg Harbour on 9 April and moved to Doucelles, where it spent a few days. It then carried out a 90-mile march in five days across France to Bailleul-lès-Pernes, arriving on 23 April.

When the German offensive in the west opened early on 10 May, A and C Companies were digging cable trenches at Doullens when a nearby camp was bombed. The BEF immediately activated 'Plan D' and advanced into Belgium. 4th Battalion was assembled and marched via Robecq, Steenwerck and Wervicq-Sud, crossing the Belgian frontier on 12 May. Next day it took over bridge and airfield guard and anti-paratroop duties around Watermolen and Wevelghem airfield, carrying out patrols to investigate reports that proved unreliable. On 14 May, HQ and B Companies came directly under 44th (HC) Division HQ at Watermolen. On 17 May the battalion was ordered to make a night march beyond Lille, which was under heavy air attack and then north east of Steenbrugge, where 133rd Bde began digging in on the reserve line along the Escaut line.

However, the German Army had crossed the Meuse on 13 May and broken through the Ardennes to the east, forcing the BEF to withdraw again, and by 19 May the whole force was back on the Escaut line, with 44th (HC) Division holding the most dangerous sector. The Germans established bridgeheads across the river at dawn on 20 May, and next day 4th Bn was sent forward to Anseghem under shellfire, losing its first casualties, including three company commanders (the Duke of Norfolk had already been evacuated to hospital sick). It maintained its position through the night, but on 22 May the Germans penetrated into a wood between 4th and 5th Royal Sussex; Lt-Col Whistler collected stragglers retreating through the battalion's positions and formed them into platoons to extend the line. There was no breakthrough: it was the deep penetration further east that forced the BEF to pull back to the 'Canal Line'. 133rd Brigade withdrew to Courtrai behind the River Lys, the battalion arriving at 05.00 on 23 May, having broken contact with the enemy.

The BEF was now cut off and falling back towards the coast, with 44th (HC) Division given the responsibility of defending the area round Hazebrouck to protect the BEF's flank. 4th Sussex spent 23 May at Wevelghem airfield, then was ordered to go by motor transport to Lille. The next night it moved to Caëstre, where it dug in. It was shelled throughout 26 May but suffered comparatively few casualties. On that day the decision was made to evacuate the BEF through Dunkirk (Operation Dynamo). 44th (HC) Division was attacked by German Panzer divisions on 27 May, but fought on doggedly: 20 enemy tanks approached 4th Royal Sussex, but the battalion and the brigade anti-tank company accounted for six of them and the others withdrew and harassed the battalion with ong-range machine gun fire. The Germans continued to shell Caëstre on 28 May while they bypassed the village. That night the battalion was ordered to destroy most of its vehicles and retire some 10 miles (16 km) to Mont des Cats, a strong position already held by the divisional artillery and support troops. It arrived at 03.00 on 29 May and relieved some engineers and transport troops holding the line. The position was shelled and attacked by low-flying aircraft in the morning, then at 10.30 on 29 May 4th Sussex was ordered to withdraw towards Dunkirk for evacuation. A and C Company became detached, and on arrival at the beaches C Company was kept by 44th (HC) Divisional HQ for guard duties. D Company also became split up, and its two parties embarked from Dunkirk and La Panne. The rest of the battalion embarked from beaches north of Dunkirk, but after arriving in England on 30 May Lt-Col Whistler immediately went back to Dunkirk to look for D Company and other stragglers from the battalion; he got home on 1 June with a battalion of the Manchester Regiment. After this unauthorised excursion he became known as 'The Man who went Back to Dunkirk'.

==== Home Defence ====
Having landed at different British ports, the 4th Sussex was re-assembled at Oxford and then moved to Goole in Northern Command, where the men were re-armed and re-equipped. The transport consisted of impressed civilian vehicles. Initially, the battalion was given a counter-attack role in the event of a seaborne invasion and was kept at high level of readiness, with constant training under Lt-Col Whistler. After reorganising and re-equipping, 44th (HC) Division came under I Corps in Northern England at the end of June. In November 1940 the division was transferred to XII Corps in invasion-threatened South East England, where it remained until early April 1942. 4th Sussex was initially stationed at Hastings, East Sussex, in beach defence, later at Deal, Kent, in a counter-attack role, then moved successively to Broadstairs and Herne Bay.

Once the imminent danger of invasion had passed, training for offensive action began. For much of this training period 44th (HC) Division was commanded by Maj-Gen Brian Horrocks, in South-Eastern Command under Lt-Gen Bernard Montgomery, the two commanders under whom it would fight in the desert.

44th (HC) Division came under War Office control on 3 April 1942, preparatory to overseas service, and at the end of May embarked on the SS J.M. McArthur at Greenock. It formed part of a convoy that sailed for the Middle East on 31 May 1942, proceeding via Freetown and Cape Town, where Lt-Col Whistler was evacuated to hospital.

==== Alam el Halfa ====
The division arrived at Suez in Egypt on 24 July, shortly after Eighth Army had retreated to the El Alamein position. At first it was in the Nile Delta defences in the rear, then on 14 August the division was called forward by Gen Montgomery and the following day assigned to XIII Corps under Lt-Gen Horrocks. The division was positioned with 133rd Bde on the vital Alam Halfa ridge, where Gen Rommel was expected to attack the El Alamein line, and its positions were protected by minefields and artillery, with armour on its flanks to counter-attack. Arriving from Cape Town, Lt-Col Whistler caught up with his battalion at Alam Halfa, and was acting commander of 133rd Bde during the subsequent battle. When the attack came in on 30 August (the Battle of Alam el Halfa), the Panzers spent hours attempting to break through in the darkness and early morning. Over the next two days the Panzers made repeated attacks but 44th (HC) Division held its position and the Panzers suffered heavy casualties. By 3 September the division was counter-attacking.

After Alam Halfa, Lt-Col Whistler was promoted to permanent command of another brigade. Meanwhile 133rd Bde with 4th Sussex was detached from 44th (HC) Division on 8 September and joined first 8th Armoured Division briefly, and then, from 29 September, 10th Armoured Division, which was lacking a Lorried Infantry Brigade. Shortage of equipment meant that the conversion to 'lorried infantry' was only just completed in time for the Second Battle of El Alamein.

==== Alamein ====
This battle was launched with Operation Lightfoot on the night of 23/24 October. 10th Armoured Division lay up some 13–16 miles behind the starting line until after dark, when it advanced to the 'Springbok Track' and topped up with fuel. After the infantry divisions had advanced, it was the turn of the armoured divisions to pass through gaps made by the sappers in the enemy's minefields. 10th Armoured Division started promptly at 02.00 and its armour reached the Miteirya Ridge (the objective codenamed 'Oxalic') but could not get beyond that to its second objective ('Pierson'). 133rd Lorried Bde had still not left Springbok by dawn. The following night, the division prepared to advance from 'Oxalic' to 'Pierson', with 133rd Bde acting as a pivot on Miteirya Ridge. Mines, air attacks and enemy gunfire slowed the advance from the congested minefield gaps.

'Lightfoot' had failed to break through: there followed what Montgomery termed the 'Dogfight' part of the battle. On 27 October, 1st Armoured Division failed again to break through, and the corps commander sent 133rd Bde up to reinforce 1st Armoured's 7th Motor Brigade holding the 'Snipe' and 'Woodcock' positions. Ground reconnaissance was impossible in daylight, and 133rd Bde HQ could not locate 7th Motor Bde's positions; after dark it was found that neither 'Snipe' nor 'Woodcock' was in British hands. 133rd Brigade therefore set off to capture them, with only a simple artillery fireplan in view of the confused situation. The attack was launched at 22.30, and 4th Royal Sussex crossed ground already held by 1st Gordon Highlanders, leading to a clash and some casualties from friendly fire. Then there was heavy fire from the left: the reserve company was sent to deal with it and was almost destroyed. By 01.30 the CO judged that the battalion had reached 'Woodcock' and began to dig in – not easy in the rocky ground. Communications with Brigade HQ and the artillery had broken down, so the battalion was on its own. The armour began to move up at dawn, but was not in place before the enemy suddenly attacked and overran 4th Royal Sussex. The battalion's casualties were 47 killed and wounded and 342 missing, mainly prisoners. (During the final part of the battle, 'Operation Supercharge', on 2 November, the 5th (Cinque Ports) Bn, Royal Sussex, of 133rd Bde put in a successful attack on 'Snipe' as the Axis defences began to crumble.) After the battle 133rd Bde was left behind to collect prisoners while Eighth Army pursued the beaten enemy westwards.

=== 4th/5th (Cinque Ports) Battalion ===
133rd Bde was broken up on 31 December 1942, and on New Year's Day 1943 its 4th and 5th (Cinque Ports) Bns of the Royal Sussex were combined as a single unit: 4th/5th (Cinque Ports) Battalion. This became a permanent amalgamation. The battalion was sent from Egypt to Iraq, and on arrival on 1 February it came under the command of 27th Indian Infantry Brigade in 6th Indian Division. This formed part of Tenth Army, protecting the vital oilfields and lines of communication to the Soviet Union.

The battalion spent the rest of the war moving around Middle East Command: it arrived in Persia on 17 April 1943, returning to Iraq on 26 September. It then moved to Palestine on 28 March 1944, back to Persia on 24 May, and finally returned to Iraq on 16 April 1945.

After the war the battalion passed into suspended animation on 15 June 1946.

=== 6th Battalion ===
==== Battle of France ====
In April 1940, three of the new duplicate TA divisions under training, including the 12th (Eastern), were sent to France to act as labour troops to work on airfields and Lines of Communication (LoC).

On 17 May the threat to the BEF's LoC was obvious, and the partly-trained TA divisions working on labour projects were concentrated for possible action, 12th (E) Division gathering around Amiens. 37th Brigade, with only the 6th and 7th Sussex present, arrived at Amiens by train and was caught by a Luftwaffe bombing raid that destroyed one of the trains. The troops were extricated and the two battalions moved out south of Amiens, with little more than their rifles to halt the German Panzers. The following day the division was covering the important traffic centres of Albert, Doullens, Amiens and Abbeville together with two equally ill-equipped brigades of 23rd (Northumbrian) Division, all under the commander of 12th (E) Division, Maj-Gen R.L Petre, and known as 'Petreforce'. Petreforce at the time was the only thing between seven advancing Panzer divisions and the sea. On 20 May the 1st Panzer Division broke through at Albert and drove on to Amiens. Here the raw Territorials held up the German advance for 5 hours, allowing the BEF to continue its retreat towards Dunkirk. The 6th Royal Sussex was comparatively less engaged, but the 7th (Cinque Ports) Bn fought to a finish and was destroyed.

The survivors of 12th (E) Division then made their way to the coast and got out of France through Dunkirk and other evacuation ports, the division finally reaching England on 8 June and was broken up on 10 July.

==== Home Defence ====
37th Brigade became an independent formation operating directly under II Corps in Norfolk. In February 1941 the brigade transferred to XI Corps, but it was still guarding the Norfolk coast.

On 27 November 1941 37th Bde was converted into 7th Bde in 3rd Infantry Division, a Regular formation under GHQ Home Forces, training for eventual overseas service. However, in June 1942 3rd Division was converted into a 'Mixed' division and a tank brigade replaced 7th Bde, which instead became the infantry brigade in 9th Armoured Division.

At the time 9th Armoured was training hard under Maj-Gen Brian Horrocks for possible overseas service. In January 1943 it joined VIII Corps, earmarked for the planned invasion of Normandy (Operation Overlord), but it was not included in the order of battle for 21st Army Group when that was formed later in the year. Shortly after Overlord was launched on D Day, 9th Armoured Division was broken up. 6th Royal Sussex was sent on 30 July 1944 to 213th Bde in 76th Infantry Division, which were renumbered 140th Bde and 47th (Reserve) Division on 1 September. The division was a draft-producing formation, training reinforcements for the units overseas, and the battalion continued in this role until the end of the war.

After the war the battalion passed into suspended animation on 15 May 1946 at Crowborough.

== Postwar ==
The TA was reconstituted on 1 January 1947, but it was not until 13 September 1948 that the 4th/5th (Cinque Ports) Bn was reformed, now as the only TA infantry unit in the county having re-absorbed the duplicate 6th Bn. It was distributed as follows:

- HQ at Worthing
- A Company at Hayward's Heath
- B Company at Horsham
- C Company at Worthing
- D Company at Chichester

As before, the battalion was in 133 (Kent & Sussex) Brigade in 44th (Home Counties) Division.

The Home Counties' regular infantry regiments were amalgamated as the Queen's Regiment on 31 December 1966. This did not affect the TA battalions, until the TA was reduced into the Territorial and Army Volunteer Reserve (TAVR) on 1 April 1967. At this point the 4th/5th (Cinque Ports) Battalion was broken up to form two subunits:

- C (Cinque Ports) Company in 5th (Volunteer) Bn, Queen's Regiment, at St Leonards-on-Sea, Hastings, in TAVR II
- A Company in 9th (Territorial) Bn, Queen's Regiment (Royal Sussex), at Brighton, in TAVR III; this company also incorporated part of 257th (Sussex Yeomanry) Field Regiment, Royal Artillery

The TAVR was reduced further on 1 April 1969, the TAVR III elements being reduced to cadres: 9th Queen's became a cadre under 5th Queen's, with some personnel at Eastbourne forming a platoon of C (Cinque Ports) Company. (Another platoon was formed in Sussex in June 1970, at Crawley, from elements of 8th (West Kent) Bn, Queen's.)

There was a further reorganisation of the TAVR on 1 April 1971, a new 7th (V) Bn, Queen's Regiment being formed, with HQ at Denne Road, Horsham, and C (Royal Sussex) Company being formed from the cadre of 9th (T) Bn, based at Crawley with a detachment at Horsham. A full HQ Company (Royal Sussex) was formed at Horsham the following year and C Company's platoon at Horsham moved to Hayward's Heath in 1974. In effect this battalion continued the lineage of the 4th Royal Sussex, as C Company of 5th (V) Bn continued that of the 5th (Cinque Ports) Bn. All the company subtitles in the Queen's TAVR battalions were dropped by 8 October 1973, apart from the Cinque Ports company.

On 1 April 1975 the 7th (V) Bn was merged with the 6th (V) Bn (derived from the Queen's Surreys). HQ and C Companies were carried over from the 7th Bn to the new 6th/7th (V) Bn. On 16 May 1988 the companies of 6th/7th (V) Bn were named and a new company was formed in Sussex:

- HQ (Alamein) Company at Horsham
- B (Somme) Company formed at Brighton with a platoon at Worthing
- C (Quebec) Company at Crawley and Hayward's Heath

Following the Options for Change reforms of 1992, The Queen's Regiment and Royal Hampshire Regiment merged as the Princess of Wales's Royal Regiment (PWRR); C (Quebec) Company at Crawley was replaced by a Hampshire Company. Then on 1 July 1999 the 5th (V) Bn and 6th/7th (V) Bn were merged as 3rd (V) Bn PWRR. The companies at Horsham (Alamein) and Hastings (Cinque Ports) were disbanded, and Sussex was represented by B (Royal Sussex) Company at Brighton and Worthing.

B Company of the present-day 3PWRR is still based at Brighton and Eastbourne.

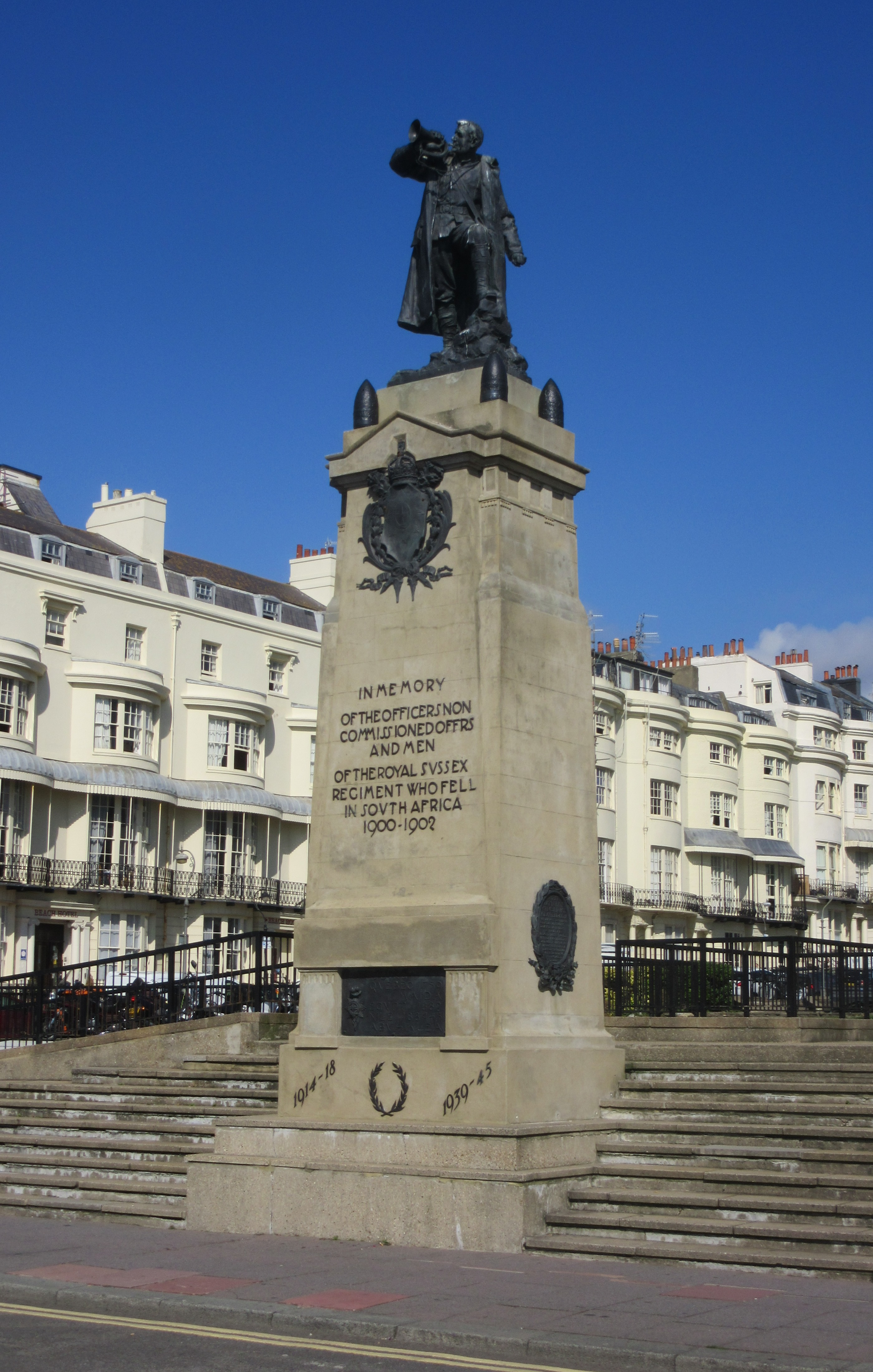
The Royal Sussex Regiment's Boer War memorial in Brighton.

== Memorials ==
The Royal Sussex Regiment's Boer War memorial stands in Regency Square, Brighton; it lists 160 names, including W.G. Barttelot and the other casualties of the Volunteer Service Companies.

The Royal Sussex Regiment's Memorial Chapel (St George's Chapel) in Chichester Cathedral lists the regiment's First World War dead on a series of panels by battalion, with a memorial book for those of WWII.

There is a memorial board in St Mary the Virgin Church, Petworth, to those of D Company, 4th Royal Sussex, who died in the First World War. A memorial chapel in St Mary the Virgin Church, Horsham, commemorates those from the parish, the 4th Royal Sussex, and Collyer's School who died in the Second World War.

== Honorary Colonels ==
The following served as Honorary Colonel of the 2nd Sussex RVC and its successors:

- Sir Walter Barttelot, 1st Baronet, CB, former CO, appointed 18 January 1882
- W.H. Campion, VD, former CO, appointed 7 February 1903
- Brig-Gen W.L. Osborn, CB, CMG, DSO, appointed 10 July 1926
- Sir Winston Churchill, KG, Lord Warden of the Cinque Ports, appointed 1 January 1943 (from 5th (Cinque Ports) Bn), died 24 January 1965
- Sir Robert Menzies, KT, Lord Warden of the Cinque Ports, appointed 1 June 1966, continued with 5th (V) Bn
- Bernard Fitzalan-Howard, 16th Duke of Norfolk, appointed 1 April 1967 to 9th (T) Bn; also 5th (V) Bn from 1 April 1972, died 31 January 1975
- Brig Arthur Catchmay Tyler, CBE, MC, 7th (V) Bn to 1975
