= Edmund Musgrave Barttelot =

British explorer, soldier, and adventurer (1859–1888)

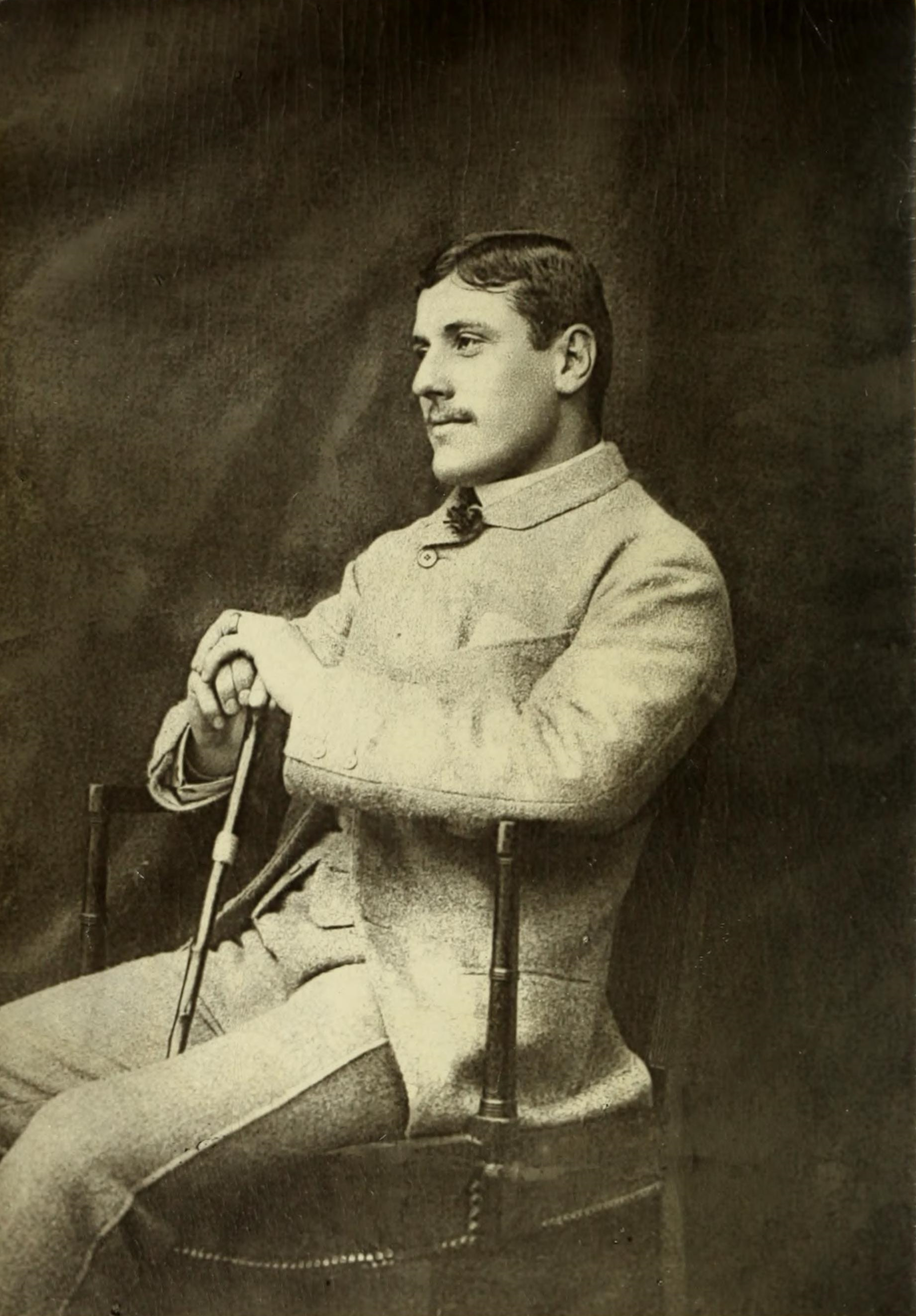
- Born: 28 April 1859; Petworth, Sussex, England
- Died: 19 July 1888 (aged 29); Banalya, Congo Free State
- Education: Royal Military College, Sandhurst
- Military career
- Allegiance: United Kingdom
- Branch: British Army
- Service years: 1879–1888
- Rank: Brevet Major
- Units: Royal Fusiliers
- Conflicts: Second Anglo-Afghan War; Anglo–Egyptian War; Mahdist War

Edmund Musgrave Barttelot (28 March 1859 – 19 July 1888) was a British army officer, who became notorious after his allegedly brutal and deranged behaviour during his disastrous command of the rear column in the Congo during Henry Morton Stanley's Emin Pasha Relief Expedition. He has often been identified as one of the sources for the character of Kurtz in Joseph Conrad's 1899 novel Heart of Darkness.

== Life ==
Barttelot was born in Petworth, West Sussex, the second son of Sir Walter Barttelot, 1st Baronet and his first wife, Harriet Musgrave. He attended Sandhurst before receiving a commission in the 7th Regiment of Foot on 22 January 1879 at the age of 19. Barttelot served in the British Raj before fighting in the Second Anglo-Afghan War and the Anglo–Egyptian War. During the Nile Expedition of 1884–85, he joined the Camel Corps on their march to Khartoum, and caused some controversy by shooting an Aden man who attempted to vandalise a waterskin and struck Barttelot with a stick. Barttelot was promoted to the rank of captain on 8 September 1886 before being brevetted Major the following day in recognition of his service in Sudan.

In 1886, he volunteered for Henry Morton Stanley's Emin Pasha Relief Expedition. As Stanley's second in command, he was leader of the Rear Column which was left at Yambuya on the Aruwimi River to wait for more porters to be brought by the Arab slave trader Tippu Tip while Stanley marched on to reach Emin as soon as possible. During Stanley's absence, the Rear Column descended into confusion. Barttelot was unable to maintain discipline, and resorted to repeated floggings of Africans, at least two of whom died from the beatings. Large numbers of bearers died from malnutrition and untreated illness or deserted. Although the Rear Column finally received some of the Manyema porters, it had only got as far as Banalya when the Major threatened a woman with his revolver because she was beating a drum during a ceremony in the early hours of the morning. He was shot dead by the woman's husband, a man named Sanga or Samba.

Stanley received reports about Barttelot's behaviour from other officers. One, William Bonny, said that "the least thing caused the Major to behave like a fiend" and that he would repeatedly stab African workers with a steel-pointed cane, bit a woman, and tried to poison an Arab chief. Bonny's comments, however, have been regarded with scepticism by historians who have studied the expedition, on account of his habitual dishonesty, his doctoring of his old diary entries, and his opium addiction. Another officer, John Rose Troup, said that the Major "had an intense hatred of anything in the shape of a black man". His 13-year-old 'boy' named Sudi bin Bohati had been beaten and kicked by him. Stanley nursed the injured Sudi, who died six weeks after Stanley returned. Furious, Stanley mainly blamed Barttelot for the failure of the Rear Column, though he also criticised the other officers for allowing him to "kick, strike and slay human beings". After being sewn into a blanket, Barttelot's body was buried in the forest.

== Reputation ==
After the return of expedition-members to Europe and America, Barttelot's alleged abusive and incompetent behaviour was widely reported. In response, Barttelot's brother, Walter George Barttelot edited the diaries of his brother, defending his reputation and adding some biting comments on Stanley's behaviour.

Modern historians have generally accepted the negative assessment of Barttelot. Adam Hochschild wrote that after being left in charge of the Rear Column,

Major Barttelot promptly lost his mind. He sent Stanley's personal baggage down the river. He dispatched another officer on a bizarre three-thousand-mile three-month round trip to the nearest telegraph station to send a senseless telegram to England. He next decided that he was being poisoned, and saw traitors on all sides. He had one of his porters lashed three-hundred times (which proved fatal). He jabbed at Africans with a steel-tipped cane, ordered several dozen people put in chains, and bit a village woman. After trying to interfere with a native festival, an African shot and killed Barttelot before he could do more.

Barttelot has been portrayed as a model for Kurtz in Joseph Conrad's novel Heart of Darkness. Jerry Allen considered him the principal historical model, though Harold Bloom argued that there was no single model, and that many of Kurtz's actions were more likely to be based on Barttelot's contemporary Tippu Tip. Hochschild also considers him a likely source, since he "went mad, began hitting, whipping, and killing people, and was finally murdered", but also thinks that other participants in the expedition and contemporary figures contributed to the character.

He appears as a character in Simon Gray's 1978 play The Rear Column, which tells the story of the men of the rear column left by Stanley to wait for Tippu Tip. He is portrayed as weak and unstable. Barttelot was played by Barry Foster in the original production and in the 1980 BBC television version.

== See also ==
- Barttelot baronets
