= Sir Walter Barttelot, 1st Baronet =

The Right Honourable Sir Walter Barttelot Bt., CB
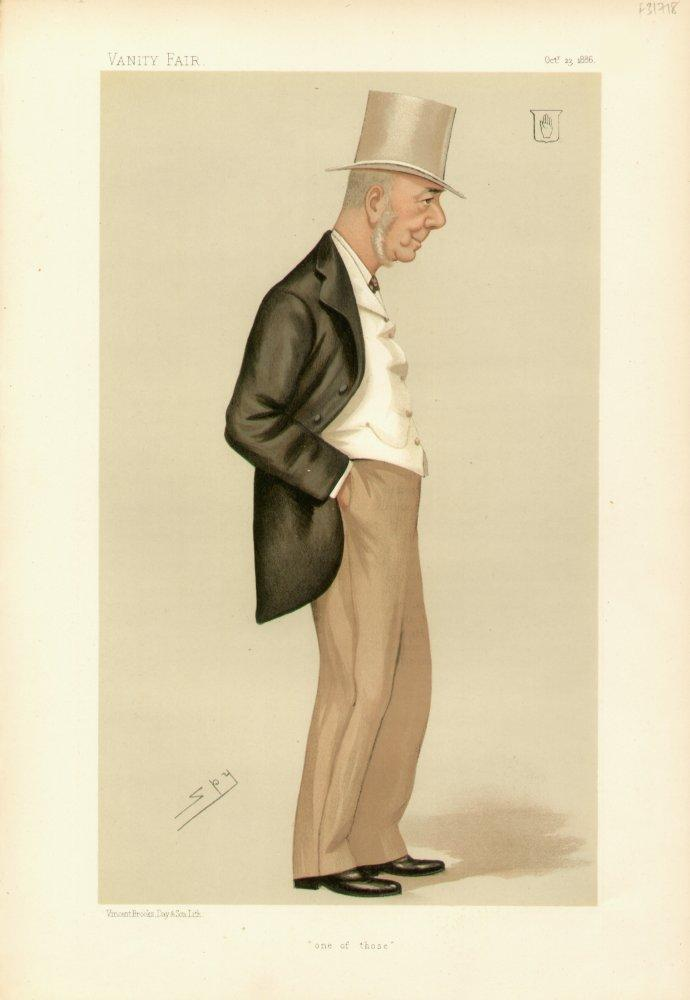
- "One of those"; Caricature by Spy published in Vanity Fair in 1886

Member of Parliament for Horsham
- In office 1885–1893
- Preceded by: Henry Aubrey-Fletcher
- Succeeded by: John Heywood Johnstone

Member of Parliament for West Sussex
- In office 1860–1885 Serving with Henry Wyndham; The Earl of March
- Preceded by: The Earl of March
- Succeeded by: Constituency abolished

Personal details
- Born: 10 October 1820 Richmond, London (then in Surrey), England
- Died: 2 February 1893 (aged 72) Petworth, West Sussex
- Party: Conservative
- Spouse: Harriet Musgrave (m. 1852)
- Children: 7, including Edith, Walter and Edmund
- Education: Rugby School
- Occupation: Politician, military officer

Sir Walter Barttelot, 1st Baronet, CB (10 October 1820 – 2 February 1893) was a Conservative Party politician in the United Kingdom who served as Member of Parliament for several constituencies.

== Life ==
A member of an ancient Sussex family, Barttelot was the son of George Barttelot and his wife Emma (née Woodbridge). He was educated at Rugby School and then served in the 1st Royal Dragoons, purchasing his captaincy on 7 February 1845. After retirement from the army he raised the 6th (Petworth) Sussex Rifle Volunteer Corps on 15 February 1860 and was promoted to major to command the 2nd Administrative Battalion, Sussex Rifle Volunteer Corps on 26 April 1860. He continued to command the 2nd Sussex Rifle Volunteers until he became its Honorary Colonel in 1882.

In December 1860 he was elected as a Member of Parliament for West Sussex, which he served until 1885 when he became member for Horsham, serving until his death. Horsham's Barttelot Road off the Brighton Road was named after him. Sussex Police Headquarters was located there and current photographs of Barttelot Road are featured (Hidden Horsham). Barttelot was created a baronet, of Stopham in the County of Sussex, on 14 June 1875, and made a Companion of the Order of the Bath in 1880. In 1892 he was admitted to the Privy Council.

He became a director of the London, Brighton and South Coast Railway in August 1864, and served as its chairman from April to July 1867.

Barttelot married firstly Harriet, daughter of Sir Christopher Musgrave, 9th Baronet, in 1852. They had two sons (Walter Barttelot, who became the 2nd Baronet and Edmund Musgrave Barttelot who died whilst in command of the rear column in the Congo during the Emin Pasha Relief Expedition led by Henry Morton Stanley) and five daughters, including Dame Edith Sclater. After his first wife's death in 1863 he married secondly Margaret, daughter of Henry Boldero, in 1868. They had no children. Lady Barttelot died in January 1893. Barttelot survived her by only a few days and died in early February 1893, aged 72. He was succeeded in the baronetcy by his eldest son Walter.

== See also ==
- Barttelot baronets
- Sir Walter George Barttelot, 2nd Baronet
- Sir Walter Balfour Barttelot, 3rd Baronet

Parliament of the United Kingdom
Preceded by Earl of March; Henry Wyndham	Member of Parliament for West Sussex; 1860–1885; With: Henry Wyndham to 1869; The Earl of March from 1869	Constituency abolished
Preceded by Sir Henry Fletcher	Member of Parliament for Horsham; 1885–1893	Succeeded by John Heywood Johnstone
Baronetage of the United Kingdom
New title	Baronet (of Stopham); 1875–1893	Succeeded by Walter George Barttelot
Business positions
Preceded by Peter Northall Lawrie	Chairman of the Board of Directors of the London, Brighton and South Coast Railway; April–July 1867	Succeeded by Samuel Laing
