= David Barttelot =

English cricketer (1821–1852)

Personal information
- Full name: David Smyth Barttelot
- Born: 24 October 1821; Richmond-upon-Thames, Surrey, England
- Died: 11 July 1852 (aged 30); Sydney, New South Wales, Australia
- Batting: Unknown

Career statistics
| Competition | First-class |
|---|---|
| Matches | 1 |
| Runs scored | 8 |
| Batting average | 4.00 |
| 100s/50s | –/– |
| Top score | 5 |
| Balls bowled | – |
| Wickets | – |
| Bowling average | – |
| 5 wickets in innings | – |
| 10 wickets in match | – |
| Best bowling | – |
| Catches/stumpings | –/– |
- Source: Cricinfo, 28 January 2012

David Smyth Barttelot (24 October 1821 – 11 July 1852) was an English cricketer. Barttelot's batting style is also unknown. The son of George Barttelot and Emma Woodbridge, he was born at Richmond-upon-Thames, Surrey. He was initially educated at Rugby School, before attending both Jesus College, Cambridge, and Corpus Christi College, Oxford. He did not play cricket for Cambridge University.

Barttelot made a single first-class appearance for Petworth against Hampshire at Day's Ground, Southampton, in 1845. Hampshire were dismissed for 72 in their first-innings, while in response Petworth made 69 in their first-innings, with Barttelot being dismissed in that innings for 5 runs by Daniel Day. Hampshire were then dismissed for 123 in their second-innings, leaving Petworth with a target of 126 for victory. Petworth could only to make 99 all out during their chase, with Barttelot scoring 3 runs, before being dismissed by Day again. Hampshire won the match by 27 runs and this was Barttelot's only major appearance.

He later moved to Australia, where he died at Sydney, New South Wales on 11 July 1852.
