= Sir Walter Barttelot, 2nd Baronet =

- Born: 11 April 1855; Sidmouth, Devon
- Died: 23 July 1900 (aged 45)
- Military career
- Allegiance: United Kingdom
- Branch: British Army
- Rank: Major
- Units: 5th Dragoon Guards; 1st Devon Yeomanry Cavalry; Royal Sussex Regiment
- Conflicts: Second Boer War

Sir Walter George Barttelot, 2nd Baronet, CB (11 April 1855 – 23 July 1900) was of the Barttelot Baronetcy and son of Sir Walter Barttelot, 1st Baronet.

== Early life and military career ==
Barttelot was born on 11 April 1855, the first son of Sir Walter Barttelot, 1st Baronet and Harriet Musgrave. His younger brother, Major Edmund Musgrave Barttelot (1859–1888), was an army officer in the Royal Fusiliers who was killed in the Congo, Africa in 1888, while Commander of the rear column of the Emin Pasha Relief Expedition. Their sister was Dame Edith Sclater, DBE (1856–1927).

He was educated at Eton College and subsequently served for some years in the 5th Dragoon Guards, in which he attained the rank of captain, retiring in 1879.

In 1880, he was appointed captain in the 1st Devon Yeomanry Cavalry, and in 1886, captain and honorary major in the 2nd Volunteer Battalion, Royal Sussex Regiment. He was appointed CB in the 1892 New Year Honours.

He held the office of Justice of the Peace for Sussex, the office of Justice of the Peace for Devon and was County Councillor for the Western Division of Sussex. He succeeded to the title of 2nd Baronet Barttelot, of Stopham, Sussex on 2 February 1893, after his father died of natural causes on the same day of his second wife's funeral.

Following the outbreak of the Second Boer War in late 1899, Barttelot volunteered for active service and in early March 1900 was granted the temporary rank of captain in the army while serving with the volunteer company of the Royal Sussex Regiment in South Africa. He was killed in action on 23 July 1900 (aged 45) at Retief's Nek, Orange Free State in South Africa.

== Family ==
Barttelot married Georgiana Mary Balfour, the only daughter of George Edmond Balfour and Marianna Jowitt of the Manor, Sidmouth, on 3 June 1879. He was survived by his wife and two sons, among whom were:

- The eldest son, Sir Walter Balfour Barttelot, 3rd Baronet, who was killed in Tehran, Persia on 23 October 1918, while Military Attaché to Tehran during the First World War.
- The younger son, Lieutenant-Commander Nigel Kenneth Walter Barttelot, who was killed in the early days of World War I, whilst commanding the destroyer HMS Liberty during the Battle of Heligoland Bight.

== Legacy ==
Barttelot Road, in Horsham, West Sussex, takes its name from the family.

Baronetage of the United Kingdom
Preceded by Sir Walter Barttelot	Baronet (of Stopham); 1893–1900	Succeeded by Sir Walter Balfour Barttelot
