= Stopham =

Village and parish in West Sussex, England

Coordinates: 50.9605°N 0.5405°W

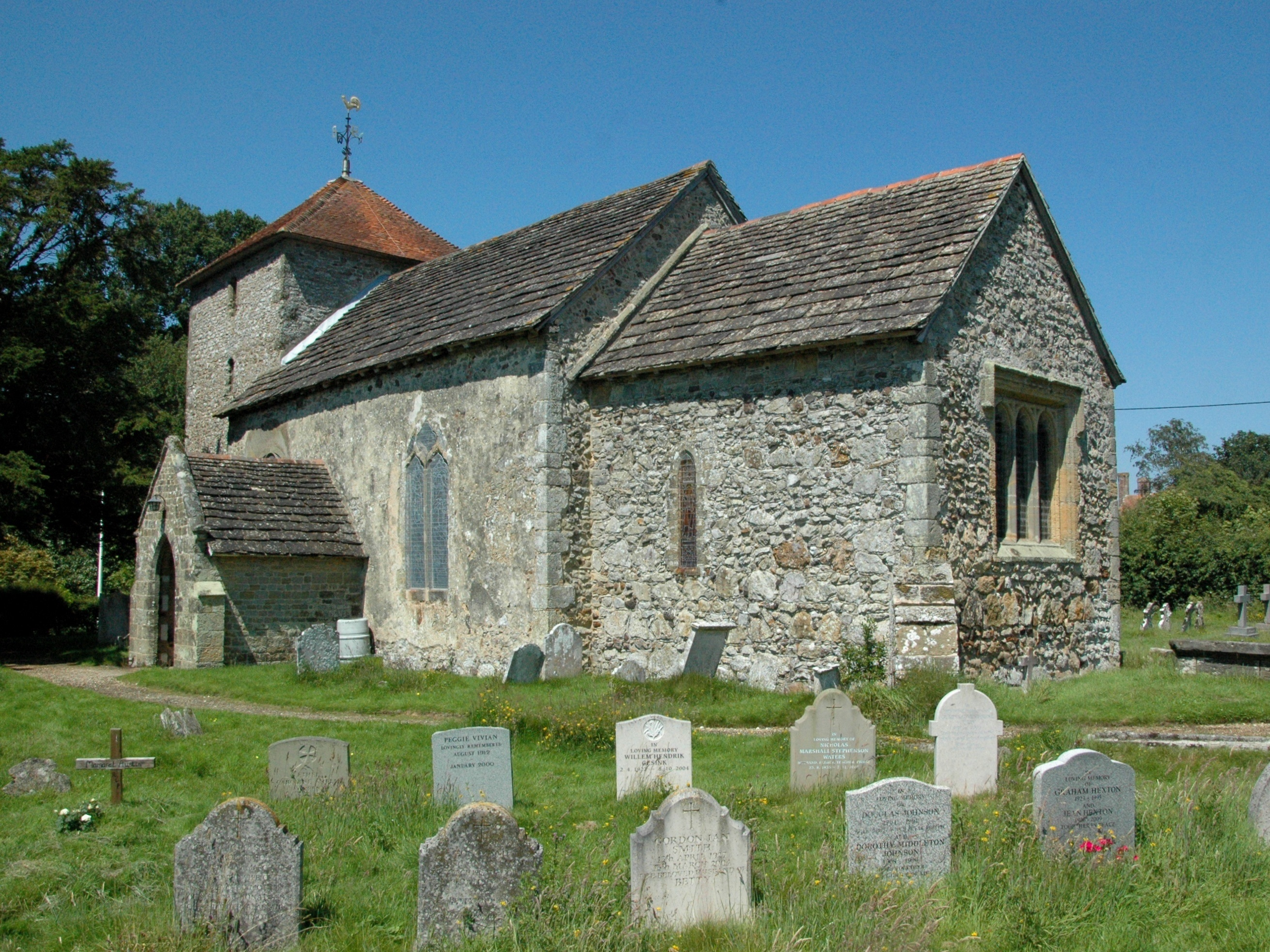
- St Mary the Virgin parish church

- Location within West Sussex
- Area: 3.54 km^{2} (1.37 sq mi)
- Population: 87 (2001 Census)
  - Density: 25/km^{2} (65/sq mi)
- OS grid reference: TQ0218
  - London: 42 miles (68 km) NNE
- Civil parish: Stopham
- District: Chichester
- Shire county: West Sussex
- Region: South East
- Country: England
- Sovereign state: United Kingdom
- Post town: Pulborough
- Postcode district: RH20
- Dialling code: 01798
- Police: Sussex
- Fire: West Sussex
- Ambulance: South East Coast
- UK Parliament: Arundel and South Downs

Stopham is a hamlet and civil parish in the District of Chichester in West Sussex, England, about 1.5 miles (2.4 km) west of Pulborough on the A283 road. It is in the civil parish of Fittleworth.

The parish has a land area of 874 acres (354 ha). The 2001 Census recorded 87 people living in 39 households, of whom 40 were economically active.

== Manor ==
The Domesday Book of 1086 records a manor of Stopham or Stopeham. Descendants of the same family, the Bartletts or Barttelots, who married the senior co-heir of the Stophams in 1379, have ensured that the same lineage, albeit with a different surname, has held the manor since the Norman Conquest of England. Since 1875 they have been baronets.

Part of the present manor house is dated 1485, but there was a house on the site before that. The house was given a new east front in the 16th century but was partly demolished in 1638. Its plan is E-shaped, a layout popular for Jacobean manor houses. The house is a Grade II* listed building.

== Parish church ==
The earliest parts of the Church of England parish church of St Mary the Virgin are 11th-century Saxon or Saxo-Norman, and the remainder of the building is 12th-century Norman. New windows were inserted in the chancel in the 13th century and in the nave in the 14th century. The west tower was rebuilt about 1600. The east window of the chancel was inserted in 1638 but is significantly older, having been transferred to its present position from the manor house. The church contains a series of monumental brasses to members of the Barttelot family: three pairs from the 15th century and one set from the early 17th century. The church is a Grade I listed building.

St Mary's parish is part of a combined benefice with the parish of St Mary the Virgin, Fittleworth.

== Stopham Bridge ==
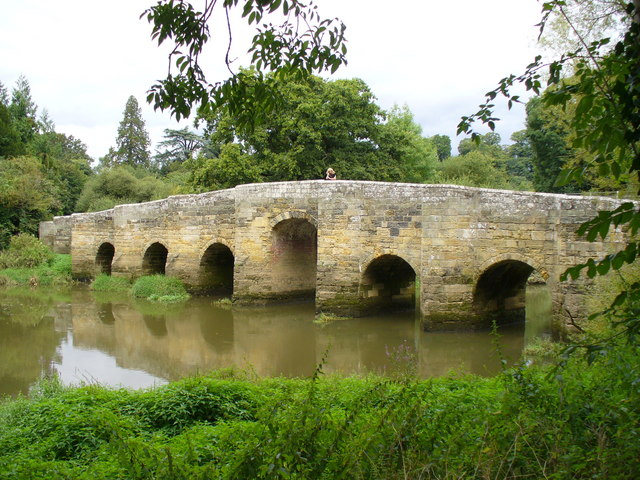
Stopham Bridge on the River Arun

Stopham Bridge is a Grade I listed building and a Scheduled Monument. Despite much speculation over the construction date of this ironstone bridge, the correct date is believed to be c.1422-3. One span of the bridge was destroyed during the Civil War and replaced by a drawbridge. The bridge's central arch was modified in 1822 and bears this date.

The bridge carried the A283 through the village, with traffic light control being introduced in 1936. The bridge was badly damaged by Army lorries during the Second World War but has been repaired since.

In 1986, Stopham Bridge was superseded by a new reinforced concrete bridge, located just 50 feet to the north, to alleviate the large queues which built up at this point and due to increasing levels of damage to the inside of the parapet by vehicles traversing the bridge. Due to poor ground conditions, the piers of the new bridge are supported on piles that go down between 15 and 20 metres to the sandstone bedrock.

== Economic history ==
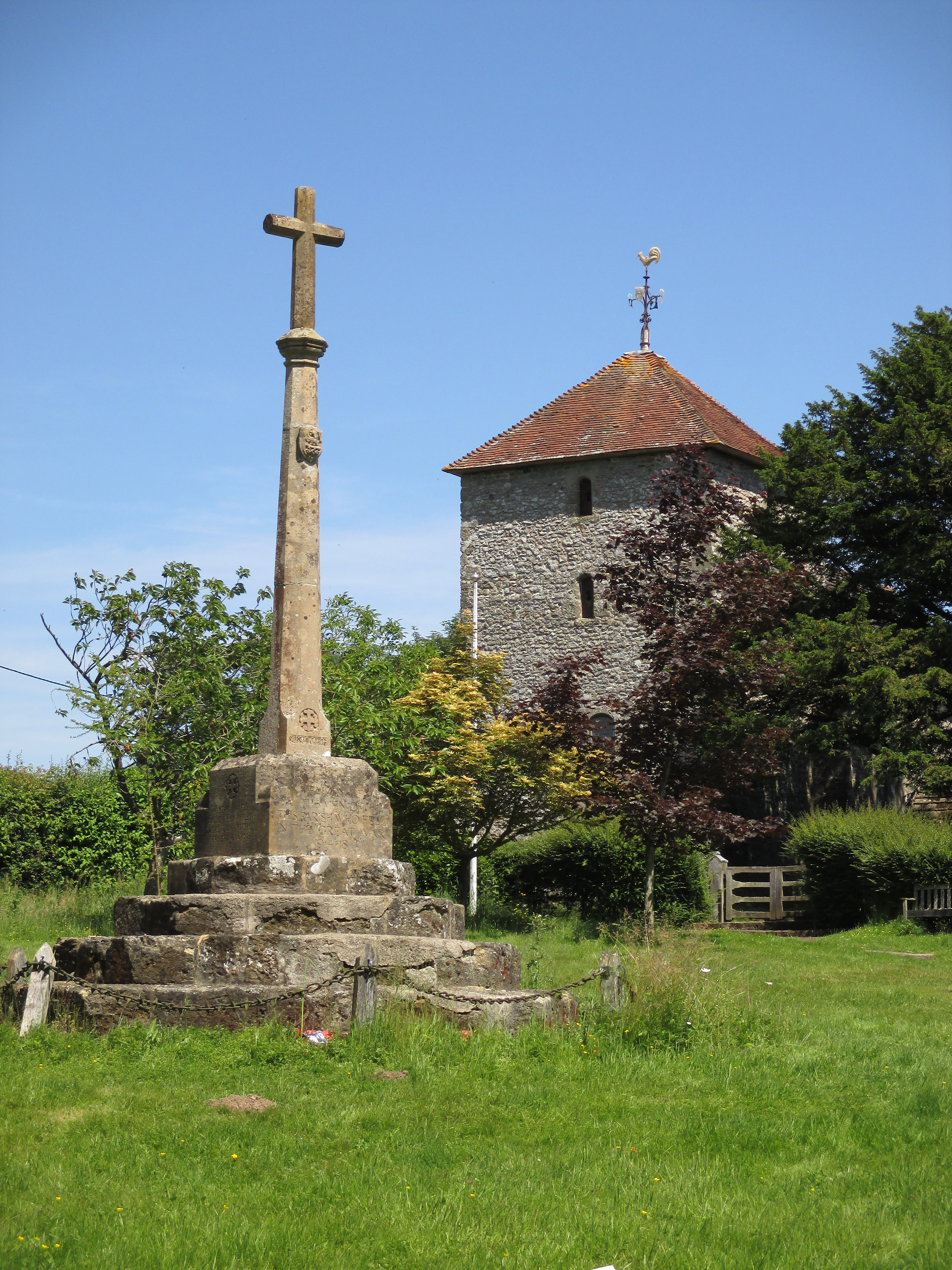
Stopham war memorial and church

The parish is bounded to the east by the River Arun, spanned by Stopham Bridge. There has been a bridge here since the 14th century, apparently built in 1347 and possibly of timber. The present stone bridge has seven arches and was probably built in 1422–23. The River Rother forms the southern boundary of the parish from its confluence with the Arun below Stopham Bridge.

Lee Farm, about 0.5 miles (800 m) southwest of the village, is a timber-framed house Tudor with red brick nogging. A date carved in two places on the house says either "1492" or, more likely, "1592". The house is a Grade II* listed building.

In the 1790s work began to make the Rother navigable to Midhurst, beginning with a canal cut from the Arun between the Rother and what is now the A283 road. The first lock was built in the grounds of Stopham House. In 1821–22 the central arch of Stopham Bridge was rebuilt much higher than the others to give enough airdraught for navigation.

Stopham has a public house, the White Hart, which is on the former main road at the east end of Stopham Bridge. The A283 road now bypasses the pub and old bridge on a new bridge built in the 20th century.

Stopham Vineyard was established in 2007 upon the planting of 21,000 vines on a six-hectare (15-acre) estate by its owner, Simon Woodhead.

== Sources and further reading ==
- Jervoise, Edwyn (1930). The Ancient Bridges of the South of England. Vol. I. Westminster: The Architectural Press for the SPAB. pp. 57–58.
- Nairn, Ian; Pevsner, Nikolaus (1965). Sussex. The Buildings of England. Harmondsworth: Penguin Books. pp. 341–343. ISBN 0-14-071028-0.
- Vine, P.A.L. (1995). London's Lost Route to Midhurst The Earl of Egremont's Navigation. Sutton Publishing. ISBN 0750909684.
