= Barttelot baronets =

Baronetcy in the Baronetage of the United Kingdom

Arms of Barttelot: Sable, three sinister gloves pendent argent tasselled or

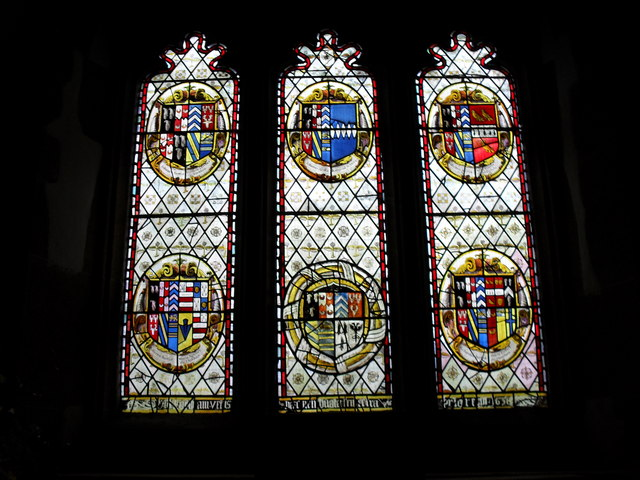
1638 Stained glass window in St Mary's Church, Stopham, Sussex, showing arms of the Barttelot family

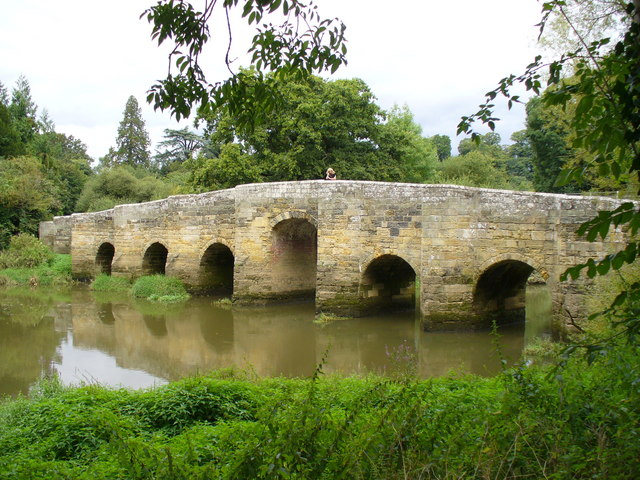
Stopham Bridge on the River Arun, built in the 14th century by the atte Forde family, which controlled river crossings, to replace the old ford, next to the site of their original residence "La Forde", now the site of Stopham House, converted to flats in 1958. The de Stophams, lords of the manor, married the heiress of atte Forde and the Barttelots married the heiress of de Stopham. The former ancient manor house of the Stophams, today a farm house, is situated next to the parish church. The present manor house, known as "Stopham Park" is a neo-classical structure built in 1958 on the site of a well-positioned estate cottage

The Barttelot Baronetcy, of Stopham in the County of West Sussex, is a title in the Baronetage of the United Kingdom.

== History ==
The Baronetage was created on 14 June 1875 for the Conservative politician Walter Barttelot. The family surname is pronounced "Bartlot". The Barttelot family claims to be the oldest gentry family in Sussex and has been seated at the manor of Stopham since 1379, which they inherited on marriage to the heiress of the de Stopham family, where they had a residence at "La Ford", situated by the ancient crossing point of the River Arun, where they built the surviving bridge the tolls of which they controlled for many centuries.

The parish church has a large collection of heraldic brasses and stained glass windows of the Barttelot family. The 2nd Baronet was killed in action during the Boer War, the 3rd Baronet in WW I and the 4th Baronet in WW II. The title is now held by Colonel Sir Brian Barttelot, 5th Baronet (born 1941), OBE DL, great-great-grandson of the 1st Baronet (the title having descended in the direct line) who succeeded his father in 1944. He is a Colonel in the Coldstream Guards and a vice-president of the Standing Council of the Baronetage.

The family residence is Stopham Park, near Pulborough, West Sussex, built on the family's estate in 1958 by the widow of the 4th Baronet as a smaller residence, having given up occupancy of the family's historic seat of Stopham House, converted to 11 flats.

== Barttelot baronets, of Stopham (1875) ==
- Sir Walter Barttelot Barttelot, 1st Baronet (1820–1893)
- Sir Walter George Barttelot, 2nd Baronet (1855–1900)
- Sir Walter Balfour Barttelot, 3rd Baronet (1880–1918)
- Sir Walter de Stopham Barttelot, 4th Baronet (1904–1944)
- Sir Brian Walter de Stopham Barttelot, 5th Baronet OBE CStJ (b. 1941)

The heir presumptive is the present holder's brother, Robin Ravenscroft Barttelot (b. 1943).

== Gallery ==
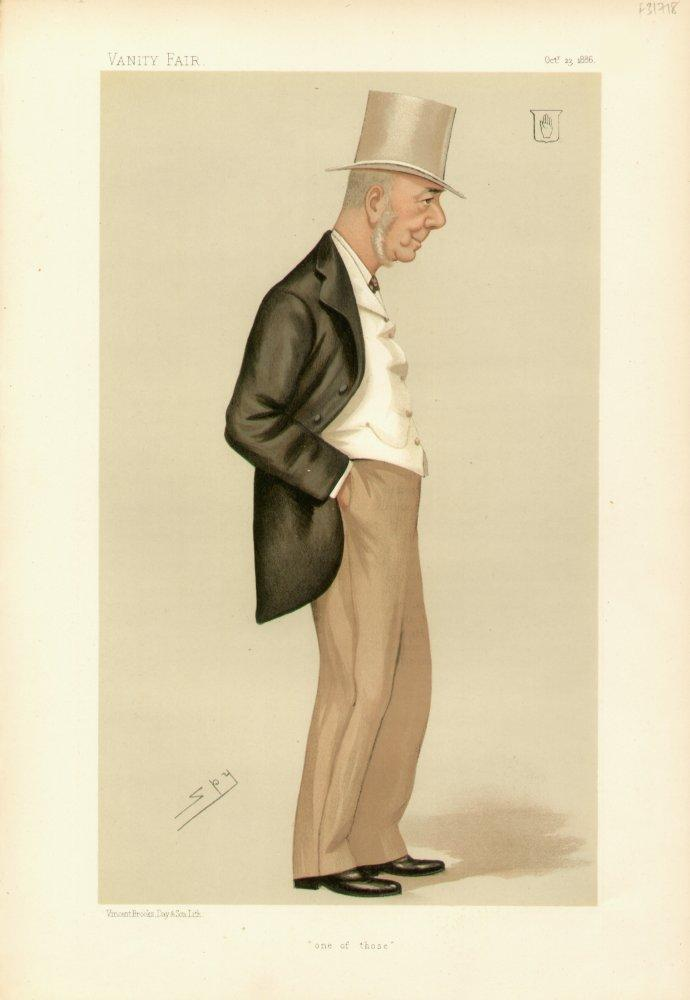
Spy Caricature of Sir Walter Barttelot, 1st Baronet c. 1886.

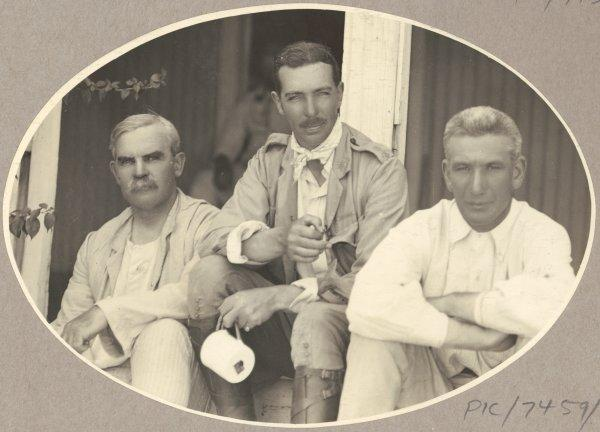
From left: Minister Josiah Thomas, Sir Walter Balfour Barttelot and Administrator John Gilruth in 1912.

== Notes ==
Baronetage of the United Kingdom
Preceded by Lusk baronets	Barttelot baronets of Stopham; 14 June 1875	Succeeded by Scourfield baronets
