= Sussex Militia =

Auxiliary force of the British Army

The Sussex Militia was an auxiliary (Note: It is incorrect to describe the British Militia as 'irregular': throughout their history they were equipped and trained exactly like the line regiments of the regular army, and once embodied in time of war they were fulltime professional soldiers for the duration of their enlistment.) military force in Sussex on the South Coast of England. From their formal organisation as trained bands in 1572 they defended the coastline, watched the Spanish Armada and took an active part in the English Civil War. It was the Sussex Militia who captured the Duke of Monmouth after his unsuccessful Rebellion in 1685. After a long hiatus, the Sussex Militia was reformed in 1778 and provided internal security and home defence in all of Britain's major wars thereafter. It eventually became the Royal Sussex Light Infantry Militia (RSLIM) and also formed the Royal Sussex Militia Artillery. After the Cardwell Reforms the RSLIM became a battalion of the Royal Sussex Regiment and saw active service in the Second Boer War. It served as a Special Reserve training unit in World War I. After 1921 the militia had only a shadowy existence until its final abolition in 1953.

== Early history ==
The English militia was descended from the Anglo-Saxon Fyrd, the military force raised from the freemen of the shires under command of their Sheriff. It continued under the Norman kings, notably at the Battle of the Standard (1138). The force was reorganised under the Assizes of Arms of 1181 and 1252, and again by King Edward I's Statute of Winchester of 1285. Under this statute 'Commissioners of Array' would levy the required number of men from each shire. The usual shire contingent was 1000 infantry commanded by a millenar, divided into companies of 100 commanded by centenars or ductores, and subdivided into platoons of 20 led by vintenars. The coastal towns of Sussex forming part of the Cinque Ports also had a legal obligation to supply ships, seamen and marines for the Royal Navy. King Henry VIII strengthened the military capability of the country and in 1539 he called out a 'Great Muster' across the country, when the armed men mustered in the rapes of Sussex amounted to:

- City of Chichester: 35 bowmen and 75 billmen (of which 20 and 25 respectively had 'harness' or armour), 8 handgunners, and 18 unarmoured billmen listed as 'aliens'; Chichester appears to have listed 237 able-bodied men
- Rape of Chichester: 559 bowmen and 811 billmen, of which about 278 were armoured
- Rape of Arundel: 526 bowmen and 1163 billmen
- Rape of Bramber: 123 bowmen and 215 billmen
- Rape of Pevensey: 1868 bowmen and 802 billmen
- Rape of Hastings: 450 bowmen and 681 billmen

(These figures do not include the Rape of Lewes nor the men who were to be fielded by the great landowners and clergy. The 'aliens' in Chichester include Frenchmen, Dutchmen and Bretons.)

== Sussex Trained Bands ==
The legal basis of the militia was updated by two acts of 1557 covering musters (4 & 5 Ph. & M. c. 3) and the maintenance of horses and armour (4 & 5 Ph. & M. c. 2). The county militia was now under the Lord Lieutenant, assisted by the Deputy Lieutenants and Justices of the Peace (JPs). The entry into force of these Acts in 1558 is seen as the starting date for the organised county militia in England. Although the militia obligation was universal, it was clearly impractical to train and equip every able-bodied man, so after 1572 the practice was to select a proportion of men for the trained bands, who were mustered for regular training. The government aimed for 10 days' training a year, with a two-day 'general muster' at Michaelmas, and two 'special musters' lasting four days for detailed training at Easter and Whitsun. When war broke out with Spain training and equipping the militia became a priority. From 1583 counties were organised into groups for training purposes, with emphasis on the invasion-threatened 'maritime' counties including Sussex.

In the 16th Century little distinction was made between the militia and the troops levied by the counties for overseas expeditions. However, the counties usually conscripted the unemployed and criminals rather than the Trained Bandsmen – in 1585 the Privy Council ordered the impressment of able-bodied unemployed men in Surrey (100) and Sussex (150) for the expedition to the Netherlands, but the Queen ordered 'none of her trayned-bands to be pressed'. Replacing the weapons issued to the levies from the militia armouries was a heavy cost on the counties.

=== Armada ===
The Armada Crisis in 1588 led to the mobilisation of the trained bands. They were mustered in April when the returns from Sussex indicated that of 7572 able-bodied men in the county 2004 were trained, and a further 2001 were armed but untrained, in addition to the cavalry:

- Infantry:
  - Calivers (the caliver was an early infantry firearm): 360 trained, 682 untrained
  - Muskets: 600 trained, 237 untrained
  - Corslets (armoured pikemen): 600 trained, 282 untrained
  - Bows: 180 trained, 588 untrained
  - Bills: 264 trained, 212 untrained
- Cavalry:
  - Lancers: 200
  - Light horsemen: 204
  - Petronels (the petronel was an early cavalry firearm): 30

The trained bands were called out on 23 July, and shadowed the Armada as it sailed up the English Channel. Four thousand trained bandsmen of Kent were ordered to reinforce those of Sussex if the Armada landed there. But the Armada was defeated at sea and was unable to land any troops: the trained bands were stood down shortly afterwards.

=== Bishops' Wars ===
With the passing of the threat of invasion, the trained bands declined in the early 17th Century. Later, King Charles I attempted to reform them into a national force or 'Perfect Militia' answering to the king rather than local control. By 1638 Sussex had 1804 musketeers, 1000 corslets and 160 horsemen, organised by rapes as follows:

- Chichester Trained Band
- Arundel Trained Band
- Bramber Trained Band
- Lewes Trained Band
- Pevensey Trained Band
- Hastings Trained Band
- Sussex Trained Band Horse

This system was tested in the Bishops' Wars. On 18 November 1638 all English counties were instructed to muster their trained bands and keep them in readiness. However, the men from the southern counties were not actually used in the King's abortive campaign. In the Second Bishops' War Sussex was ordered in March 1640 to send 600 trained bandsmen to Gravesend to be shipped to Newcastle upon Tyne along with the trained bands of other southern counties to take part in the campaign. In the event, most counties sent 'pressed men' rather than the trained men, and the army was of poor quality.

=== Civil War ===
Control of the trained bands was one of the major points of dispute between Charles I and Parliament that led to the English Civil War. However, with a few exceptions neither side made much use of the trained bands during the war beyond securing the county armouries for their own full-time troops. Sussex was one exception, its TBs seeing some action, first when involved in the siege of Portsmouth and Southsea Castle when they were captured for Parliament by Sir William Waller in September 1642. On the night of 15 November a group of Royalists in Chichester overpowered Captain Henry Chitty's company of trained bandsmen guarding the walls and seized their cannon at the North Gate (one of those captured at Portsmouth). Chitty and William Cawley, the Member of Parliament (MP) for Midhurst, fled to Portsmouth while the Royalists secured the trained band armoury. Next day the Royalist High Sheriff of Sussex, Sir Edward Ford, arrived with a force to garrison Chichester. Ford then advanced across Sussex, establishing a garrison at Arundel and moving towards Lewes. However, at Hayward's Heath he encountered the Lewes Trained Band under Herbert Morley, MP for Lewes. Although Ford's force outnumbered the trained bandsmen four-to-one, most of his men were raw country folk levied during his advance, and after a few volleys of musketry they were dispersed by a charge of the foot and horse of the Trained Band. Morley then gathered additional volunteers and recaptured Arundel, afterwards joining Waller, whose army retook Chichester in December 1642.

A year later, in December 1643, Lord Hopton captured Arundel Castle for the Royalists once more, when Catcott's Company of the Sussex TBs was in the garrison. Hearing of the loss of Arundel, Captain Edward Apsley, whose company of the Bramber Trained Band was garrisoning Cowdray House, joined other Sussex Parliamentarians in advancing against Arundel, but he was captured by a Royalist patrol. Waller finally secured Arundel for Parliament after the Battle of Alton and left Morley in command.

As Parliament tightened its grip on the country after the First English Civil War it passed new Militia Acts in 1648 and 1650 that replaced lords lieutenant with county commissioners appointed by Parliament or the Council of State. From now on the term 'Trained Band' began to disappear in most counties. Under the Commonwealth and Protectorate the militia received pay when called out, and operated alongside the New Model Army to control the country. Among the 1648 commissioners for the militia in Sussex were Herbert Morley and his brother-in-law John Fagg, MP for Rye.

During the Scottish invasion of the Third English Civil War in 1651, English county militia regiments were called out to supplement the New Model Army. In August the Sussex Militia was ordered to a rendezvous at Oxford, but was not present at the Battle of Worcester.

After the death of Oliver Cromwell, Fagg was commissioned to raise a regiment of foot by the Rump Parliament in 1659 and was taken prisoner by forces loyal to the military regime when he tried to help Morley to secure Portsmouth for Parliament.

== Restoration Militia ==
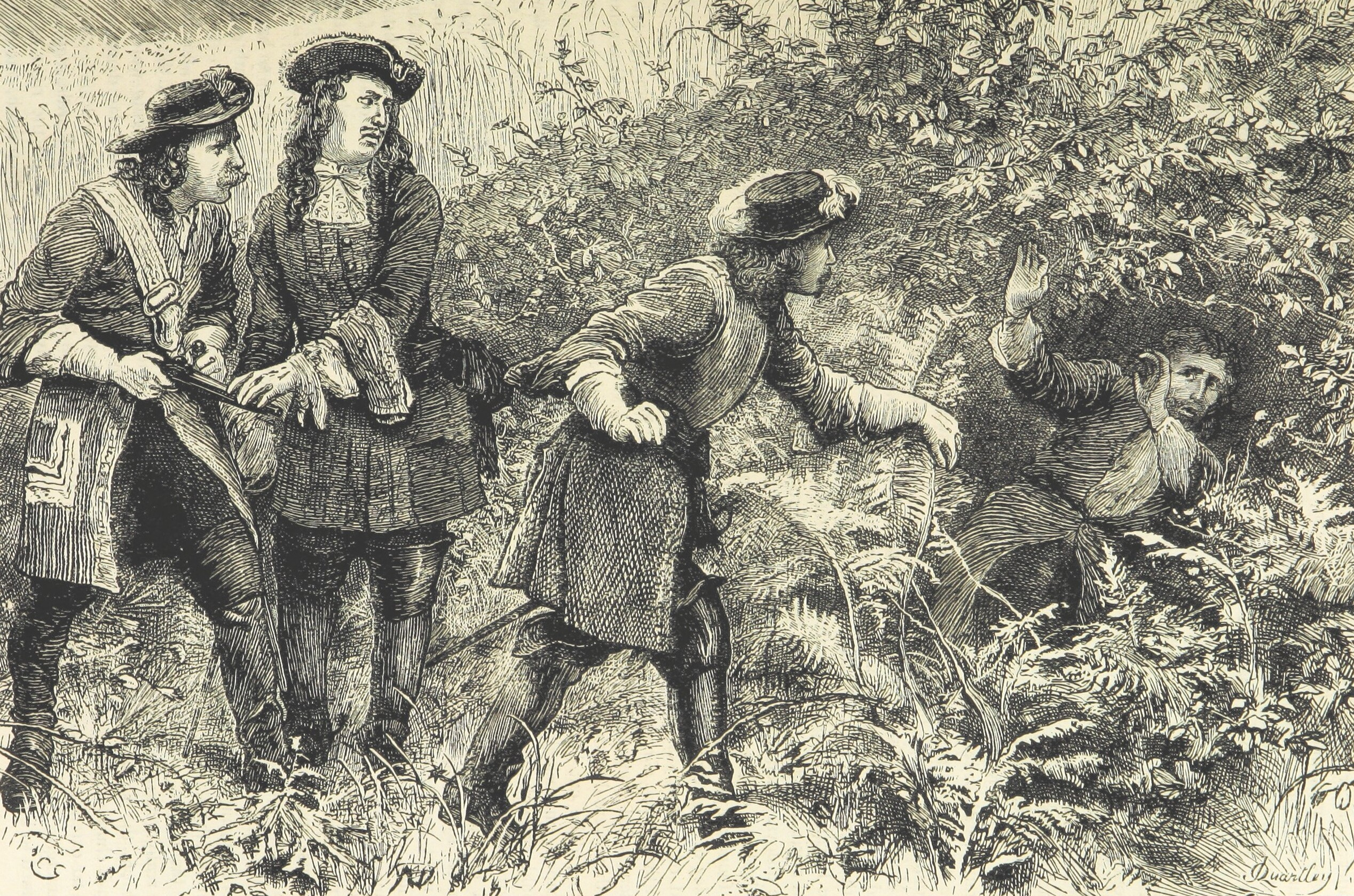
1873 illustration of Monmouth's capture

After the Stuart Restoration, The King's Sole Right over the Militia Act 1661 and the City of London Militia Act 1662 re-established the English Militia under the control of the king's lords-lieutenant, the men to be selected by ballot. This was popularly seen as the 'Constitutional Force' to counterbalance a 'Standing Army' tainted by association with the New Model Army that had supported Cromwell's military dictatorship.

The Sussex Militia was called out under Lord Lumley during the Duke of Monmouth's Rebellion in 1685. After his defeat at the Battle of Sedgemoor it was a patrol of the Sussex Militia that captured the Duke hiding near Blandford Forum, and hard-riding Sussex Militia officers that brought the news to King James II.

The militia returns for 1697 show that Sussex had two regiments – East and West – amounting to 19 companies, with an independent company at Chichester and two Troops of horse, a total of 1733 foot and 105 horse. The two colonels were John Fagg, now Sir John Fagg, 1st Baronet, MP for Steyning, and Sir William Thomas, 1st Baronet, MP for Sussex. However, the militia was allowed to decline thereafter, especially after the Peace of Utrecht in 1713.

== Reformed Militia ==
Under threat of French invasion during the Seven Years' War a series of Militia Acts from 1757 re-established county militia regiments, the men being conscripted by means of parish ballots (paid substitutes were permitted) to serve for three years. There was a property qualification for officers, who were commissioned by the lord lieutenant. Sussex was given a quota of 800 men to raise, but failed to do so – possibly because the Leader of the Opposition, the Duke of Newcastle, and his Pelham family members were powerful in the county. A patriotic ballad of the time declared:

All over the land they'll find such a stand,
From our English Militia Men ready at hand,
Though in Sussex and Middlesex folks are but fiddlesticks,
While an old fiddlestick has the command

(the 'old fiddlestick' was Newcastle, who was Lord Lieutenant of Middlesex and later of Sussex also). Newcastle had opposed the Militia Acts, but even he felt that Sussex, a county standing right in the path of potential invasion, should raise its men. Nevertheless, the county gentry were apathetic, preferring to pay a large fine instead.

=== American War of Independence ===
Sussex remained a defaulter county liable for militia fines throughout the 1760s. It was not until the American War of Independence, when Britain was threatened with invasion by the Americans' allies, France and Spain, that the Sussex Militia was reformed. It was raised and embodied at Chichester on 29 June 1778, the Lord Lieutenant of Sussex, Charles Lennox, 3rd Duke of Richmond, taking personal command as colonel. The force was still unpopular in Sussex: the imposition of the Militia Ballot caused riots in the county, but the officers took over from the parish constables the task of raising subscriptions from those who were liable, and used the money to hire volunteers.

The Sussex Militia were disembodied in March 1783 after the preliminaries of the Treaty of Paris had been signed, ending the war. From 1784 to 1792 the militia were assembled for their 28 days' annual peacetime training, but to save money only two-thirds of the men were actually mustered each year.

=== French Revolutionary War ===
The Sussex Militia were re-embodied on 11 March 1792, before Revolutionary France declared war on Britain. During the French Wars the militia were employed anywhere in the country for coast defence, manning garrisons, guarding prisoners of war, and for internal security, while the regulars regarded them as a source of trained men if they could be persuaded to transfer. Their traditional local defence duties were taken over by the part-time Volunteers and mounted Yeomanry.

=== Supplementary Militia ===
In a fresh attempt to have as many men as possible under arms for home defence in order to release regulars, the Government created the Supplementary Militia, a compulsory levy of men to be trained in their spare time, and to be incorporated in the Militia in emergency. Sussex's additional quota was fixed at 1160 men, and they were organised into 14 companies. These were mustered on 29 March 1797 for 20 days' training, with three companies at Chichester, two at Arundel, two at Shoreham-by-Sea, one at East Grinstead, three at Horsham and three at Lewes. In 1799 they were formed into a 2nd Regiment, so that the original regiment was numbered 1st. The County Lieutenancy for Sussex ruled that supplementary militiamen were not entitled to a bounty unless they were actually embodied, a ruling that was adopted nationally under the Militia Act 1802 (42 Geo. 3. c. 90).

=== Napoleonic Wars ===
The Sussex Militia was disembodied April 1802 after the Treaty of Amiens. However, the Peace of Amiens was shortlived, and the militia were called out again: the Sussex were embodied on 5 May 1803. They resumed the round of coast defence and garrison duties, and increasingly became a source of recruits for the regulars.

=== Local Militia ===
While the established militia were the mainstay of national defence during the Revolutionary and Napoleonic Wars, they were supplemented from 1808 by the Local Militia, which were part-time and only to be used within their own districts. These were raised to counter the declining numbers of Volunteers, and if their ranks could not be filled voluntarily the Militia Ballot was employed. There are records of the Pevensey Local Militia being formed in Sussex.

=== Expedition to Bordeaux ===
From November 1813 the militia were invited to volunteer for limited overseas service, primarily for garrison duties in Europe. Some of the Sussex Militia volunteered for this service, and were sent to France with a Militia Brigade under the command of the Marquess of Buckingham. They embarked on 10–11 March and landed at Bordeaux just as the war was ending. They returned to England in June.

=== Long Peace ===
The Local Militia were abolished after the Battle of Waterloo and the Sussex Militia was disembodied in January 1816. After Waterloo there was another long peace. Although officers continued to be commissioned into the militia and ballots were still held until they were suspended by the Militia Act 1829, the regiments were rarely assembled for training and the permanent staffs of sergeants and drummers (who were occasionally used to maintain public order) were progressively reduced. From 4 December 1819 Charles Gordon-Lennox, 5th Duke of Richmond was colonel of the Sussex Militia and during his colonelcy the regiment was redesignated as the Sussex Light Infantry Militia in 1835 and as the Royal Sussex Light Infantry Militia (RSLIM) in 1846.

== 1852 Reorganisation ==
The Militia of the United Kingdom was revived by the Militia Act 1852, enacted during a renewed period of international tension. As before, units were raised and administered on a county basis, and filled by voluntary enlistment (although conscription by means of the Militia Ballot might be used if the counties failed to meet their quotas). Training was for 56 days on enlistment, then for 21–28 days per year, during which the men received full army pay. Under the Act, Militia units could be embodied by Royal Proclamation for full-time home defence service in three circumstances:

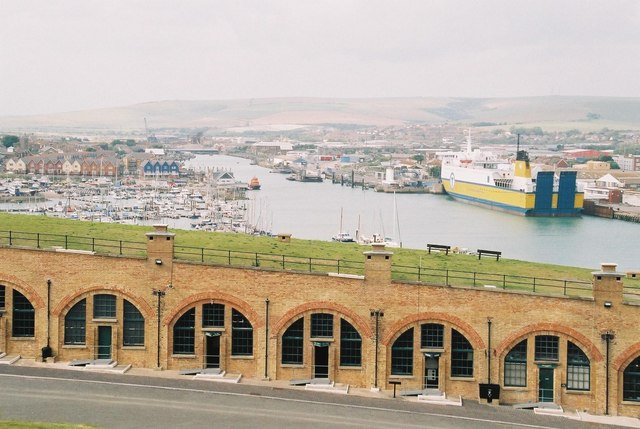
Newhaven Fort overlooking the harbour today.

1. 'Whenever a state of war exists between Her Majesty and any foreign power'.
2. 'In all cases of invasion or upon imminent danger thereof'.
3. 'In all cases of rebellion or insurrection'.

=== Artillery Militia ===
The 1852 Act introduced Artillery Militia units in addition to the traditional infantry regiments. Their role was to man coastal defences and fortifications, relieving the Royal Artillery (RA) for active service. Sussex was one of the counties selected to have a corps, and the Royal Sussex Militia Artillery (RSMA) came into existence on 9 April 1853 by the transfer of 206 volunteers from the RSLIM. It was based at Lewes with the Duke of Richmond as its colonel-in-chief.

=== Crimean War and Indian Mutiny ===
War having broken out with Russia in 1854 and an expeditionary force sent to the Crimea, the militia began to be called out for home defence. The RSLIM was embodied from December 1854 to January 1856 and the RSMA from 1 February 1855 to 16 June 1856. Neither served overseas. A number of militia regiments were also called out to relieve regular troops required for India during the Indian Mutiny, and the RSLIM was embodied from 12 November 1857 to February 1861

Thereafter the regiments were called out for their annual training. The Militia Reserve introduced in 1867 consisted of present and former militiamen who undertook to serve overseas in case of war.

== Cardwell and Childers Reforms ==
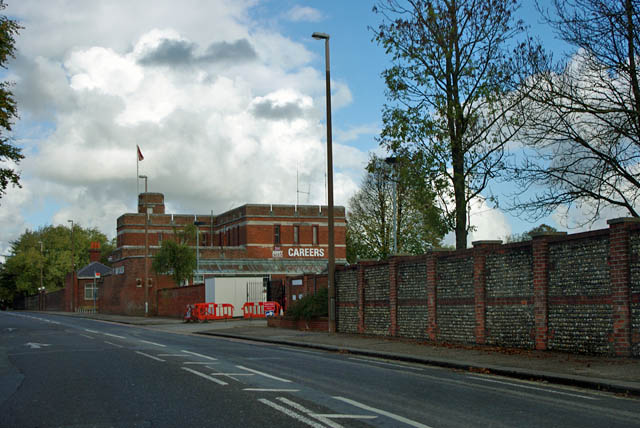
Roussillon Barracks, Chichester, depot of the Royal Sussex Regiment.

Under the 'Localisation of the Forces' scheme introduced by the Cardwell Reforms of 1872, the militia were brigaded with their local Regular and Volunteer battalions. For the RSLIM this was in Sub-District No 43 (County of Sussex) in South Eastern District, grouped with the 35th (Royal Sussex) and 107th Regiments of Foot and several Rifle Volunteer Corps. The militia now came under the War Office rather than their county lords lieutenant and battalions had a large cadre of permanent staff (about 30). Around a third of the recruits and many young officers went on to join the Regular Army. The RSLIM's headquarters had moved between Brighton and Chichester at various times in the 19th Century; now it joined the 35th and 107th in a shared depot at Chichester, where the existing barracks were expanded into Roussillon Barracks.

In the Mobilisation Scheme developed in the 1870s, the RSMA's war station was at Newhaven Fort.

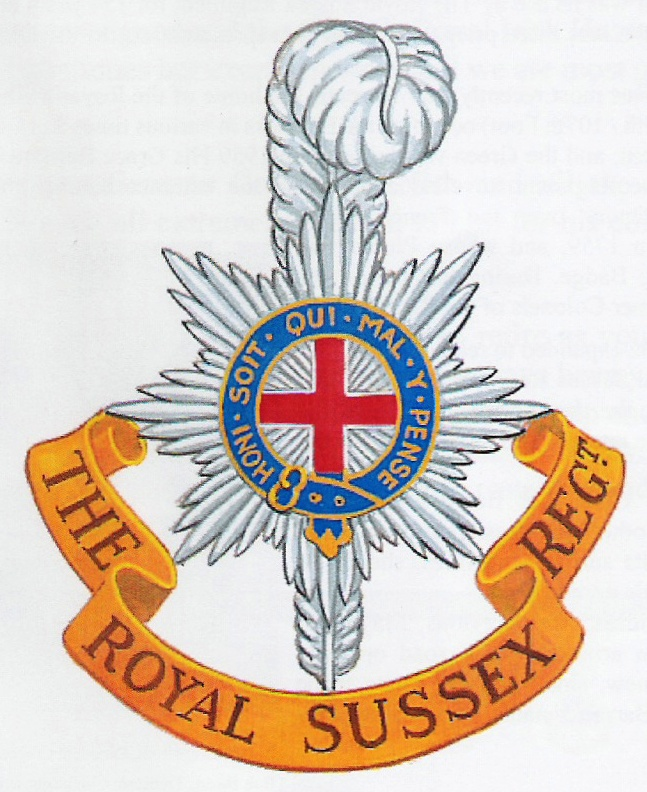
The badge of the Royal Sussex Regiment, incorporating the Garter Star of the RSLIM and the Roussillon Plume of the 35th Foot.

The Childers Reforms of 1881 took Cardwell's reforms further, with the linked regular regiments becoming two-battalion regiments and their attached militia formally joining as sequentially numbered battalions. The Cardwell system had envisaged two militia battalions in each regimental district, so the RSLIM was split to form the 3rd and 4th (Royal Sussex Militia) Bns, Royal Sussex Regiment, on 1 July 1881. However, the 3rd and 4th Bns were amalgamated again on 1 April 1890. (Note: A new 4th Battalion was formed in the Territorial Force in 1908.)

=== Second Boer War ===
After the disasters of Black Week at the start of the Second Boer War in December 1899, most of the regular army was sent to South Africa, the militia reserve was called out to reinforce them, and many militia units were embodied to replace them for home defence and to garrison certain overseas stations. The 3rd Bn Royal Sussex was embodied on 11 December 1899, and the Sussex Artillery from 1 May to 17 October 1900. As the war continued, additional troops were required in South Africa for line of communication duties. The 3rd Bn volunteered in March 1901 and served in South Africa until the end o the war, receiving the Battle honour South Africa 1901–02.

== Special Reserve ==
After the Boer War, there were moves to reform the Auxiliary Forces (militia, yeomanry and volunteers) to take their place in the six army corps proposed by St John Brodrick as Secretary of State for War. However, little of Brodrick's scheme was carried out. The artillery militia became part of the Royal Garrison Artillery (RGA), with the Sussex unit redesignated the Sussex RGA (Militia).

Under the sweeping Haldane Reforms of 1908, the militia was replaced by the Special Reserve, a semi-professional force similar to the previous militia reserve, whose role was to provide reinforcement drafts for regular units serving overseas in wartime. The 3rd (Royal Sussex Militia) Bn became the 3rd (Reserve) Battalion, Royal Sussex Regiment on 14 June 1908.

Although the majority of the officers and men of the Sussex RGA (M) accepted transfer to the Special Reserve Royal Field Artillery (RFA) and the unit became the Sussex Royal Field Reserve Artillery on 24 May 1908, all these units were disbanded in March 1909. Instead the men of the Special Reserve RFA would form Brigade Ammunition Columns for the Regular RFA brigades on the outbreak of war.

== World War I ==
=== 3rd (Reserve) Battalion ===
On the outbreak of World War I the Special Reserve was embodied on 4 August and the 3rd Royal Sussex mobilised at Chichester before going to its war station at Dover. Its role throughout the war was to prepare reinforcement drafts of reservists, special reservists, recruits and returning wounded for the regular battalions serving overseas: the 1st Royal Sussex remained in India throughout the war, but the 2nd Bn went to France with the British Expeditionary Force and fought on the Western Front until the Armistice with Germany. The SR battalions also formed reserve battalions for the service battalions of 'Kitchener's Army'; 3rd (Reserve) Bn formed 10th (Reserve) Bn (see below) at Dover in October 1914. The SR battalions' secondary role was as garrison troops in Home Defence and 3rd (Res) Bn moved in May 1915 to Newhaven, where it remained in the Newhaven Garrison for the rest of the war. It was disembodied on 4 August 1919.

=== 10th (Reserve) Battalion ===
After Lord Kitchener issued his call for volunteers in August 1914, the battalions of the 1st, 2nd and 3rd New Armies ('K1', 'K2' and 'K3' of 'Kitchener's Army') were quickly formed at the regimental depots. The SR battalions also swelled with new recruits and were soon well above their establishment strength. On 8 October 1914 each SR battalion was ordered to use the surplus to form a service battalion of the 4th New Army ('K4'). Accordingly, the 3rd (Reserve) Bn at Dover formed the 10th (Service) Bn of the Royal Sussex. It trained for active service as part of 97th Brigade in 32nd Division. On 10 April 1915 the War Office decided to convert the K4 battalions into 2nd Reserve units, providing drafts for the K1–K3 battalions in the same way that the SR was doing for the Regular battalions. The Royal Sussex battalion became 10th (Reserve) Battalion and the following month it moved to Colchester in 5th Reserve Brigade, where it trained drafts for the 7th, 8th and 9th (Service) Bns of the Royal Sussex. In September it moved with the brigade to Shoreham-by-Sea. On 1 September 1916 the 2nd Reserve battalions were transferred to the Training Reserve (TR) and the battalion became 23rd Training Reserve Bn, still in 5th Reserve Bde at Shoreham, later moving to St Albans. The training staff retained their Sussex badges. On 24 October 1917 the battalion transferred to the Queen's Royal Regiment (West Surrey) as 53rd (Young Soldier) Battalion, remaining in 5th Reserve Bde. After the war ended it was converted into a service battalion on 8 February 1919 and was absorbed into 2/4th Bn, Queen's, in April 1919.

=== Postwar ===
The SR resumed its old title of Militia in 1921 and then became the Supplementary Reserve in 1924, but almost all militia battalions remained in abeyance after World War I. Until 1939 they continued to appear in the Army List, but they were not activated during World War II and were all formally disbanded in April 1953.

== See also ==
- Special Reserve
- Royal Sussex Light Infantry Militia
- Royal Sussex Militia Artillery
- Royal Sussex Regiment
