= Royal Sussex Light Infantry Militia =

- Active: 1778-1953
- Country: United Kingdom
- Branch: British Army
- Type: Infantry
- Role: Militia/Special Reserve
- Size: 1–2 battalions
- Garrison/HQ: Roussillon Barracks, Chichester, West Sussex
- Engagements: Second Boer War

Commanders
- Notable commanders: Charles Lennox, 3rd Duke of Richmond; Charles Gordon-Lennox, 5th Duke of Richmond; Charles Gordon-Lennox, 7th Duke of Richmond

The Royal Sussex Light Infantry Militia, later the 3rd Battalion, Royal Sussex Regiment, was an auxiliary (Note: It is incorrect to describe the British Militia as 'irregular': throughout their history they were equipped and trained exactly like the line regiments of the regular army, and once embodied in time of war they were fulltime professional soldiers for the duration of their enlistment.) regiment raised in Sussex on the South Coast of England. From its formal creation in 1778 the regiment served in home defence in all of Britain's major wars. It saw active service during the Second Boer War, and trained thousands of reinforcements during World War I. After a shadowy postwar existence it was formally disbanded in 1953

== Background ==
The universal obligation to military service in the Shire levy was long established in England and its legal basis was updated by two acts of 1557 (4 & 5 Ph. & M. cc. 2 and 3), which placed selected men, the 'trained bands', under the command of Lords Lieutenant appointed by the monarch. This is seen as the starting date for the organised county militia in England. The Sussex Trained Bands were on coast defence duties during the Armada campaign of 1588, and some elements saw active service during the English Civil War, at the sieges of Chichester and Arundel Castle and at the Battle of Muster Green. The Militia was re-established in 1661 after the restoration of the monarchy, and was popularly seen as the 'Constitutional Force' in contrast to the 'Standing Army' that was tainted by association with the New Model Army that had supported the military dictatorship of the Protectorate. It was called out during the Duke of Monmouth's Rebellion – it was a Sussex Militia patrol that captured the defeated duke – and consisted of two regiments of foot and two troops of horse in 1697, but the militia declined in the years after the Peace of Utrecht in 1713.

== Royal Sussex Light Infantry Militia ==
Under threat of French invasion during the Seven Years' War a series of Militia Acts from 1757 re-established county militia regiments, the men being conscripted by means of parish ballots (paid substitutes were permitted) to serve for three years. There was a property qualification for officers, who were commissioned by the lord lieutenant. Sussex was given a quota of 800 men to raise, but failed to do so – possibly because the Leader of the Opposition, the Duke of Newcastle, and his Pelham family members were powerful in the county. A patriotic ballad of the time declared:

All over the land they'll find such a stand,
From our English Militia Men ready at hand,
Though in Sussex and Middlesex folks are but fiddlesticks,
While an old fiddlestick has the command

(the 'old fiddlestick' was Newcastle, who was Lord Lieutenant of Middlesex and later of Sussex also). Newcastle had opposed the Militia Acts, but even he felt that Sussex, a county standing right in the path of potential invasion, should raise its men. Nevertheless, the county gentry were apathetic, preferring to pay a large fine instead.

=== American War of Independence ===
Sussex remained a defaulter county liable for militia fines throughout the 1760s. It was not until the American War of Independence, when Britain was threatened with invasion by the Americans' allies, France and Spain, that the Sussex Militia was reformed. It was raised and embodied at Chichester on 29 June 1778, the Lord Lieutenant of Sussex, Charles Lennox, 3rd Duke of Richmond, taking personal command as colonel. The force was still unpopular in Sussex: the imposition of the Militia Ballot caused riots in the county, but the officers took over from the parish constables the task of raising subscriptions from those who were liable, and used the money to hire volunteers. Richmond did not ask for army pensioners as drill sergeants. A professional soldier, Richmond believed that the militia should not mimic the Regular Army's drill, but should only operate in its own localities, where local knowledge in the event of invasion would be valuable, and the militia could implement a strategy of 'scorched earth' allied with digging entrenchments. However, his efforts to obtain for the Sussex Militia the privilege of being stationed in their own county were unsuccessful.

Richmond appointed one of the Pelhams, his young friend Thomas, later 2nd Earl of Chichester, as a captain, even though they were at the time political opponents, later promoting him to major and to lieutenant-colonel. The colonel arranged smallpox inoculation for the 390 men of the regiment who had not previously been exposed to the disease. Inoculation required three weeks' sick leave in an isolation hospital; the duke was able to provide a building for this, but it could only take 60 men at a time, so it took from May to August 1779 before the whole regiment was immunised.

The Sussex Militia spent the summer of 1779 in Sussex, at Shoreham-by-Sea and Brighton. The following summer the regiment was at Ranmore Camp near Dorking in Surrey, close enough to Sussex for Pelham to stand as a candidate for Sussex in the general election and to be elected. (A surprisingly large number of Sussex militiamen were prosperous enough to be electors and claimed their statutory leave of absence to return home to vote in this election.) The regiment spent the summer of 1781 under Pelham's command stationed at Winchester. The Duke of Richmond was appointed Master-General of the Ordnance in March 1782, with Thomas Pelham in the subordinate post of Surveyor-General of the Ordnance.

The Treaty of Paris ending the war having been agreed, the Sussex Militia were disembodied in March 1783. From 1784 to 1792 the militia were assembled for their 28 days' annual peacetime training, but to save money only two-thirds of the men were actually mustered each year.

=== French Revolutionary War ===
The Sussex Militia were re-embodied on 11 March 1792, before Revolutionary France declared war on Britain. During the French Wars the militia were employed anywhere in the country for coast defence, manning garrisons, guarding prisoners of war, and for internal security, while the regulars regarded them as a source of trained men if they could be persuaded to transfer. Their traditional local defence duties were taken over by the part-time Volunteers and mounted Yeomanry.

While encamped in 1796 the Sussex Militia introduced a scientific plan for feeding its men, using special boilers invented by SirBenjamin Thompson, Count Rumford. Some of the men were trained as cooks and served in rotation under the pay sergeants for each company, who purchased vegetables in season from the bread allowance and the men's own contributions. The men were well fed and there was great saving of fuel.

In 1796 the Government created the Supplementary Militia, a compulsory levy of men to be trained in their spare time, and to be incorporated in the Militia in emergency. Sussex's additional quota was fixed at 1160 men. When the Supplementary Militia was mobilised in 1798 Richmond wanted them to be added to the existing regiment, but they were formed into a separate 2nd regiment in 1799, when the existing regiment was numbered 1st. (Note: Some lists continue to show it as the 1st Royal Sussex even after the 2nd had been disbanded later in 1799.)

=== Napoleonic Wars ===
The Sussex Militia was disembodied April 1802 after the Treaty of Amiens. However, the Peace of Amiens was short-lived, and the militia were called out again: the Sussex were embodied (as a single regiment) on 5 May 1803. Although Richmond and Pelham wanted the militia to remain local, they resumed the round of coast defence and garrison duties across the country, and increasingly became a source of recruits for the regulars. For lack of suitable senior officers, Richmond and Pelham had to stay on, despite their heavy ministerial duties and the duke's increasing age.

During the summer of 1805, when Napoleon was massing his 'Army of England' at Boulogne for a projected invasion, the Sussex, with 877 men under Lt-Col James Martin Lloyd, were stationed at Tynemouth Barracks (5 companies), North Shields Barracks (5 companies) and Whitburn Barracks (1 company) part of a brigade under Maj-Gen Henry George Grey.

=== Expedition to Bordeaux ===
From November 1813 the militia were invited to volunteer for limited overseas service, primarily for garrison duties in Europe. Three officers and 100 other ranks of the Sussex Militia volunteered for this service, and were posted to the 2nd Provisional Battalion, alongside the Royal West Middlesex Militia whose CO, Lt-Col Bayly, commanded the battalion. The 2nd Provisional Bn assembled at Chelmsford and marched to Portsmouth where the Militia Brigade was assembling under the command of the Marquess of Buckingham, colonel of the Royal Buckinghamshire Militia and the 1st Provisional Bn. The 2nd Bn arrived on 5 March 1814 and the brigade embarked on 10–11 March. It joined the Earl of Dalhousie's division that had occupied Bordeaux just as the war was ending. The brigade did not form part of the Army of Occupation after the abdication of Napoleon and returned to England in June.

=== Long Peace ===
The Sussex Militia remained embodied during the short Waterloo Campaign of 1815 and were not disembodied until January 1816. After Waterloo there was another long peace. Although officers continued to be commissioned into the militia and ballots were still held, the regiments were rarely assembled for training and the permanent staffs of sergeants and drummers were progressively reduced. From 4 December 1819 Charles Gordon-Lennox, 5th Duke of Richmond was colonel of the Sussex Militia and during his colonelcy the regiment was redesignated as the Sussex Light Infantry Militia in 1835 and as the Royal Sussex Light Infantry Militia (RSLIM) in 1846.

== 1852 Reforms ==
The Militia of the United Kingdom was revived by the Militia Act 1852, enacted during a renewed period of international tension. As before, units were raised and administered on a county basis, and filled by voluntary enlistment (although conscription by means of the Militia Ballot might be used if the counties failed to meet their quotas). Training was for 56 days on enlistment, then for 21–28 days per year, during which the men received full army pay. Under the Act, Militia units could be embodied by Royal Proclamation for full-time home defence service in three circumstances:

1. 'Whenever a state of war exists between Her Majesty and any foreign power'.
2. 'In all cases of invasion or upon imminent danger thereof'.
3. 'In all cases of rebellion or insurrection'.

The 1852 Act introduced Artillery Militia units in addition to the traditional infantry regiments, and the RSLIM provided 206 volunteers to form the new Royal Sussex Militia Artillery on 9 April 1853. It was based at Lewes with the Duke of Richmond as its colonel-in-chief.

=== Crimean War and Indian mutiny ===
War having broken out with Russia in 1854 and an expeditionary force sent to the Crimea, the militia began to be called out for home defence. The RSLIM was embodied from December 1854 to January 1856 but did not serve overseas. A number of militia regiments were also called out to relieve regular troops required for India during the Indian Mutiny, and the RSLIM was embodied from 12 November 1857 to February 1861

Thereafter the regiments were called out for their annual training. The Militia Reserve introduced in 1867 consisted of present and former militiamen who undertook to serve overseas in case of war.

== Cardwell Reforms ==
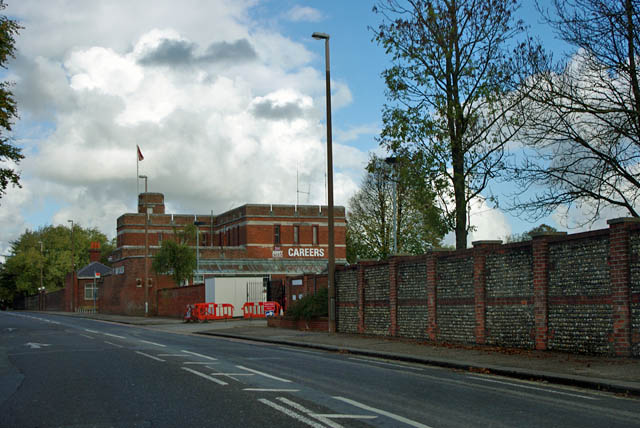
Roussillon Barracks, Chichester, depot of the Royal Sussex Regiment

Under the 'Localisation of the Forces' scheme introduced by the Cardwell Reforms of 1872, the militia were brigaded with their local Regular and Volunteers battalions. For the RSLIM this was in Sub-District No 43 (County of Sussex) in South Eastern District, grouped with the 35th (Royal Sussex) and 107th Regiments of Foot and several Rifle Volunteer Corps. The scheme assumed that there would also be two militia battalions in each sub-district, and the RSLIM formed a second battalion between 1877 and 1880. The RSLIM's headquarters had moved between Brighton and Chichester at various times in the 19th Century; now it joined the 35th and 107th in a shared depot at Chichester, where the existing barracks were expanded into Roussillon Barracks. The militia now came under the War Office rather than their county lords lieutenant. Militia battalions now had a large cadre of permanent staff (about 30). Around a third of the recruits and many young officers went on to join the Regular Army.

Following the Cardwell Reforms a mobilisation scheme began to appear in the Army List from December 1875. This assigned Regular and Militia units to places in an order of battle of corps, divisions and brigades for the 'Active Army', even though these formations were entirely theoretical, with no staff or services assigned. The Royal Sussex Militia were assigned as 'Divisional Troops' to 3rd Division, III Corps. The division would have mustered at Tunbridge Wells in time of war.

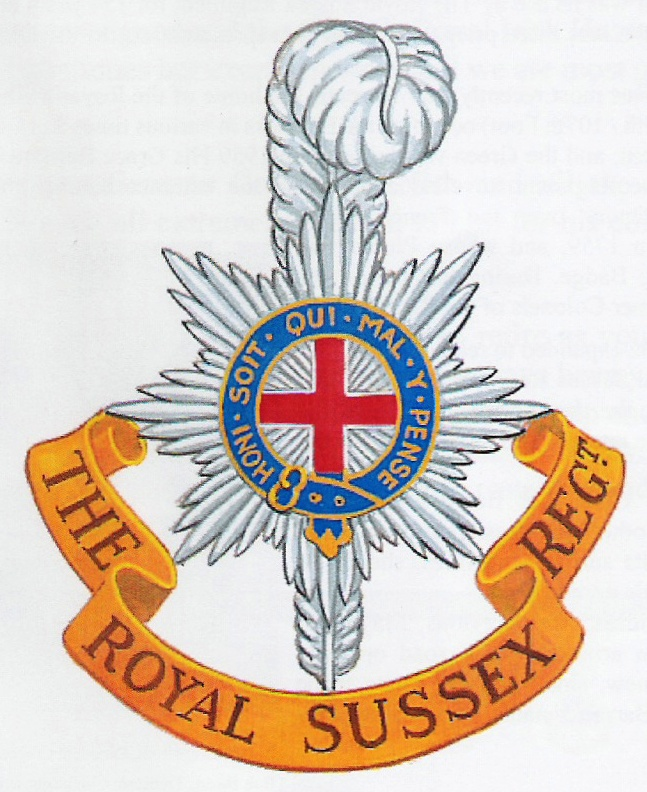
The badge of the Royal Sussex Regiment, incorporating the Garter Star of the RSLIM and the Roussillon Plume of the 35th Foot

== Royal Sussex Regiment ==
The Childers Reforms of 1881 took Cardwell's reforms further, with the linked Regular regiments becoming two-battalion regiments and their associated militia formally joining as sequentially numbered battalions. The 35th and 107th formed the 1st and 2nd Bns Royal Sussex Regiment and the two battalions of the RSLIM became the 3rd and 4th Bns on 1 July 1881. However, the 3rd and 4th Bns were amalgamated on 1 April 1890. (Note: A new 4th Battalion was formed in the Territorial Force in 1908.) The RSLIM's old Regimental colours were laid up in Chichester Cathedral in 1881.

Although Cardwell's army corps scheme had been abandoned, the Stanhope Memorandum of 1888 proposed that the home defence army should consist of three corps, of which the first two would be regular, and the bulk of the third would be militia, while the rest of the militia and the volunteers would be assigned to fixed defences round London and the seaports.

=== Second Boer War ===
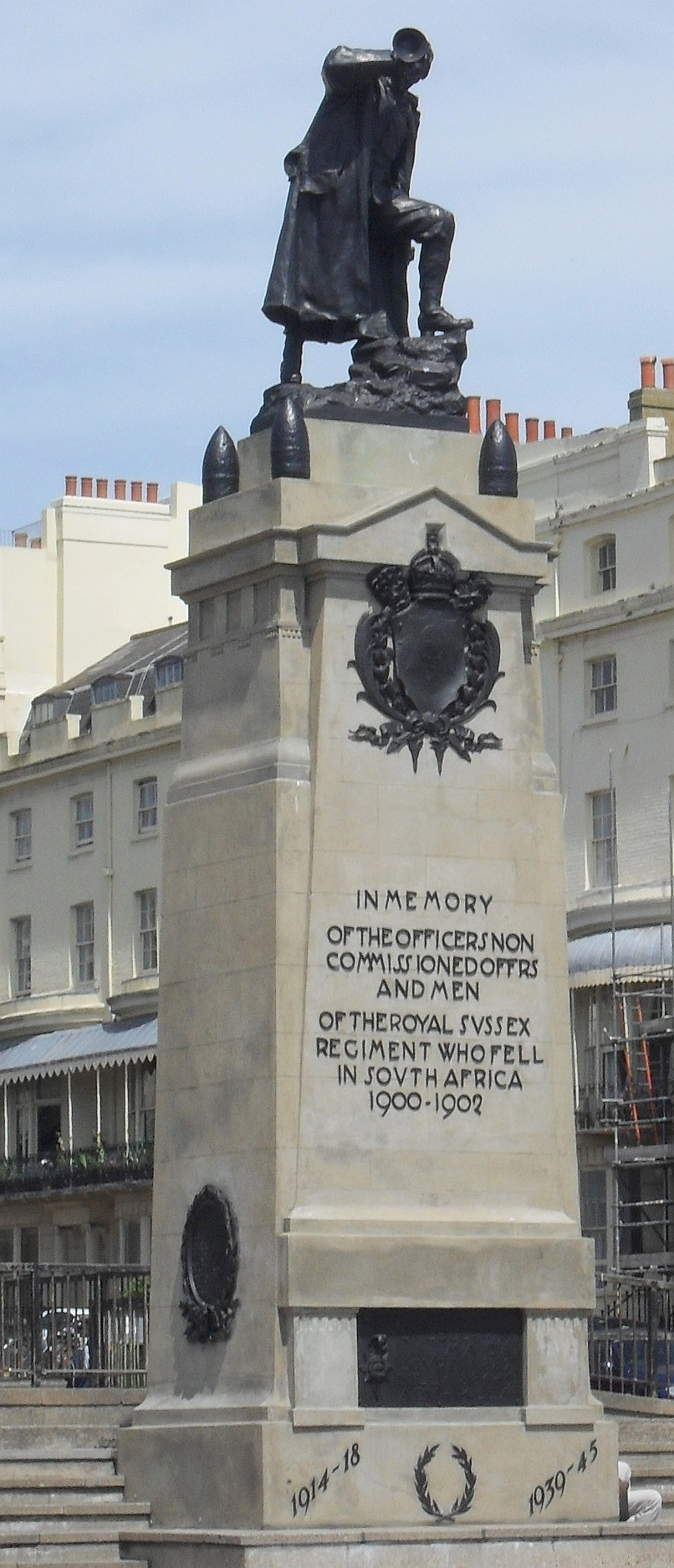
The Royal Sussex Regiment Boer War Memorial in Regency Square, Brighton

After the disasters of Black Week at the start of the Second Boer War in December 1899, most of the regular army was sent to South Africa, the militia reserve was called out to reinforce them, and many militia units were embodied to replace them for home defence and to garrison certain overseas stations. The 3rd Bn Royal Sussex was embodied on 11 December 1899.

As the war continued, additional troops were required in South Africa for line of communication (LoC) duties. The battalion volunteered in March 1901 and embarked with a strength of 23 officers and 477 ORs (the militia reservist already having been withdrawn) under the command of the Earl of March, eldest son of the 6th Duke of Richmond. On arrival the battalion carried out LoC duties and guarded Boer prisoners of war, while its Mounted Infantry detachment was employed on patrol duties and escorting convoys. Later, the battalion took part in some of the anti-guerrilla 'drives' around the Volksrust and Ingogo districts. After the Peace of Vereeniging the battalion returned home where it was disembodied on 11 September 1902. During the campaign the battalion lost 24 ORs killed or died of disease. The Earl of March was awarded a CB and Sergeant-Major Amos the Distinguished Conduct Medal. The battalion was granted the Battle honour South Africa 1901–02 and all the participants received the Queen's South Africa Medal with clasps for 'Cape Colony', 'Orange Free State', 'Transvaal', and 'South Africa 1901' and '1902'.

== Special Reserve ==
After the Boer War, there were moves to reform the Auxiliary Forces (militia, yeomanry and volunteers) to take their place in the six army corps proposed by St John Brodrick as Secretary of State for War. However, little of Brodrick's scheme was carried out. Under the sweeping Haldane Reforms of 1908, the militia was replaced by the Special Reserve, a semi-professional force similar to the previous militia reserve, whose role was to provide reinforcement drafts for regular units serving overseas in wartime. The 3rd (Royal Sussex Militia) Bn became the 3rd (Reserve) Battalion, Royal Sussex Regiment on 14 June 1908.

=== World War I ===
On the outbreak of World War I the Special Reserve was embodied on 4 August and the 3rd Royal Sussex mobilised at Chichester. It then went to its war station at Dover. Its role throughout the war was to prepare reinforcement drafts of reservists, special reservists, recruits and returning wounded for the regular battalions serving overseas: the 1st Royal Sussex remained in India throughout the war, but the 2nd Bn went to France with the British Expeditionary Force and fought on the Western Front until the Armistice with Germany. While at Dover the 3rd (Reserve) Bn may have assisted in raising of 10th (Reserve) Bn Royal Sussex from Kitchener's Army volunteers in October 1914. The SR battalions' secondary role was as garrison troops in Home Defence and 3rd (Res) Bn moved in May 1915 to Newhaven, where it remained in the Newhaven Garrison for the rest of the war.

On 10 November 1915 3rd Bn was ordered to send a draft of 109 men to the new Machine Gun Training Centre at Grantham where they were to form the basis of a machine-gun company of the new Machine Gun Corps for one of the brigades serving overseas. In addition, 10 men at a time were to undergo training at Grantham as battalion machine gunners. The order stated that 'Great care should be taken in the selection of men for training as machine gunners as only well educated and intelligent men are suitable for this work'.

The battalion was disembodied on 4 August 1919, when remaining personnel were drafted to 1st Bn.

=== Postwar ===
The SR resumed its old title of Militia in 1921 and then became the Supplementary Reserve in 1924, but almost all militia battalions remained in abeyance after World War I. Until 1939 they continued to appear in the Army List, but they were not activated during World War II and were all formally disbanded in April 1953.

== Commanders ==
The commanders of the regiment, as Colonel or (after the 1852 reforms) as Lieutenant-Colonel Commandant, included the following:

- Col Charles Lennox, 3rd Duke of Richmond, appointed 29 June 1778
- Col Charles Gordon-Lennox, 5th Duke of Richmond, appointed 4 December 1819
- Lt-Col Commandant Hon Henry Edward Hall Gage, promoted 5 February 1863
- Lt-Col Commandant John Aldridge appointed 27 October 1875
- Lt-Col Charles Gordon-Lennox, Earl of March (later 7th Duke of Richmond), promoted Lt-Col (to 2nd, later 4th Bn) 28 June 1876, appointed Lt-Col Commandant 9 July 1887
- Lt-Col R. Stephenson Clarke, promoted 28 May 1906
- Lt-Col Cecil G.H. Alers Hankey, promoted 23 April 1913

The following served as Honorary Colonel:

- Charles Gordon-Lennox, 7th Duke of Richmond, appointed 27 May 1906

== Heritage and ceremonial ==
=== Uniforms and insignia ===
From its re-foundation in 1778 the regiment's uniform was red with blue facings, though the facings changed to red by 1800. Blue facings were reintroduced later, certainly when it became a royal regiment. The clothing regulations were changed in 1798, introducing coats without lapels. However, the Sussex Militia still had 395 of the old pattern coats unused in store in 1802, and had to seek special permission to have another 203 more made, so that the whole regiment could be issued with coats of the same pattern.

In 1780 the regiment wore a simple design of button with the word 'SUSSEX' on it. It adopted the star of the Order of the Garter as its badge, probably after the Duke of Richmond became a Knight of the Garter in 1782. The officers' silver oval shoulder-belt plates in 1810 carried the Royal cypher within a crowned garter bearing the motto 'Honi soi qui mal y pense', with the title 'Sussex' on a scroll underneath. From about 1847, after it became the Royal Sussex Light Infantry, these plates carried a silver light infantry bugle horn (the coiled huntsman's horn) within a gilt garter and laurel wreath, with the title 'Royal Sussex Regt' on the garter, the whole mounted on an eight-pointed star. The shako plate of this period had the Garter star within the strings of a bugle horn, with a scroll inscribed 'Royal Sussex' beneath. The coatee buttons of 1840–55 had an eight-pointed star within a garter inscribed with the name of the regiment. The later tunic buttons had Saint George's Cross in the centre of a crowned garter and star. The ORs' forage cap badge of 1874–81 was a Garter star surmounted by a bugle horn, with a scroll beneath inscribed 'Royal Sussex'.

When the Royal Sussex Regiment was formed in 1881 the RSLIM's Garter star was combined with the Roussillon plume of the 35th Foot to produce the badge that was worn until 1966.

=== Precedence ===
When camped together, militia regiments drew lots to decide their relative order of precedence; this determined their position in the line of battle and which colonel was in command. During the War of American Independence a meeting of the lords lieutenant met to settle the order of precedence. The Duke of Richmond blocked the first proposal – that regiments should rank from their first embodiment under the 1757 Acts – because the Sussex Militia would rank last and he would be the junior colonel, even though he was a general in the regular army. Instead the lord lieutenants determined the order by ballot before each year's camping season, beginning in 1778. For the Sussex Militia the positions were:

- 27th on 1 June 1778
- 15th on 12 May 1779
- 12th on 6 May 1780
- 45th on 28 April 1781
- 12th on 7 May 1782

The militia order of precedence balloted for in 1793 (Sussex was 24th) remained in force throughout the French Revolutionary War. Another ballot for precedence took place at the start of the Napoleonic War, when Surrey was 48th. This remained in force until 1833. In that year the King drew the lots for individual regiments and the resulting list remained in force with minor amendments until the end of the militia. The regiments raised before the peace of 1763 took the first 47 places, followed by the 22 raised between 1763 and 1783: Sussex was 53rd, moving up one place 52nd in 1855 after artillery militia regiments were removed from the list. Most regiments paid little notice to the additional numeral.

=== Memorial ===
Members of the 3rd Battalion who died in the Second Boer War are commemorated on the Royal Sussex Regiment memorial in Brighton.

=== Regimental museum ===
The Royal Sussex Regiment Museum including its militia units is based at Eastbourne Redoubt in Sussex.

== See also ==
- Sussex Militia
- Militia (Great Britain)
- Militia (United Kingdom)
- Special Reserve
- Royal Sussex Militia Artillery
- Royal Sussex Regiment
- History of Sussex
