= Royal Sussex =

Royal Sussex may refer to:

- Royal Sussex County Hospital, an acute teaching hospital in Brighton, England
- The Royal Sussex Regiment, a British army unit founded in 1881, merged into the Queen's Regiment in 1966
  - 35th (Royal Sussex) Regiment of Foot, a component of the Royal Sussex Regiment
- The ancient Kingdom of Sussex, once located around modern Sussex, a county in southeast England
