= John J. Geary =

John J. Geary (c. 1835 – 1870) was a Fenian active in Cork, Ireland in the mid-19th century. Geary was from near Newcastle West, County Limerick. He was an associate of other Cork Fenians Brian Dillon, James Mountaine and John Lynch. A grocer for a time, Geary operated a pub at 27 North Main Street, Cork which was a regular meeting place of local Fenians. He was accused of being the "Head Centre" of the Fenian Brotherhood in Cork. Geary avoided arrest and fled to New York where he lived in exile.

== Biography ==
While probably working as a grocer in 1861, he wrote a letter to the Cork Examiner regarding the procurement of tea by the Cork Lunatic Asylum, which was published. He complained that his tender had been rejected even though it was cheaper than the accepted tender.

After changing profession to being a publican, local Fenian meetings and lectures were often held at Geary's pub. The meetings were also attended by informants such as John Warner. Geary employed James O'Brian at his pub as a porter, who was later accused of being a Fenian and arrested. He was later released because of lack of evidence. From 1864, the movements of Fenian leaders were closely watched by police.

1865 saw a purge of the Fenian leadership around Ireland. John Sarsfield Casey, John Thompson and Patrick Shaughnessy were arrested in Geary's pub in September 1865. The police failed to capture Geary at his pub, although it was suspected that he was there when the police arrived. A reward of 100 pounds, later increased to 200 pounds, was offered for his capture. He was described as "height, 5 feet 8 or 9 inches; medium make, (rather slight); tender eyes; fair hair, cut short; small fair whiskers; walks erect" Incriminating documents were found at Geary's pub. A person matching his description stayed at a hotel in Waterford but police were unable to locate Geary. Geary managed to evade police and escaped to New York.

Unsurprisingly, Geary did not apply to renew his alcohol license in October 1865. A satirical article in the Cork Examiner claimed that Geary was a traitor to the Irish Republican Brotherhood.

In New York, he quickly became the corresponding secretary of the Fenian Brotherhood under William R. Roberts. This put him at odds with the faction led by John O'Mahony. In 1867, he spoke in support of the Fenian Rising in Kerry.

He was killed in April 1870 when he fell into a boiling vat at the distillery where he worked.
