= Cork City Gaol =

Former prison, now a museum, in Ireland

Cork City Gaol Priosún Chathair Chorcaí
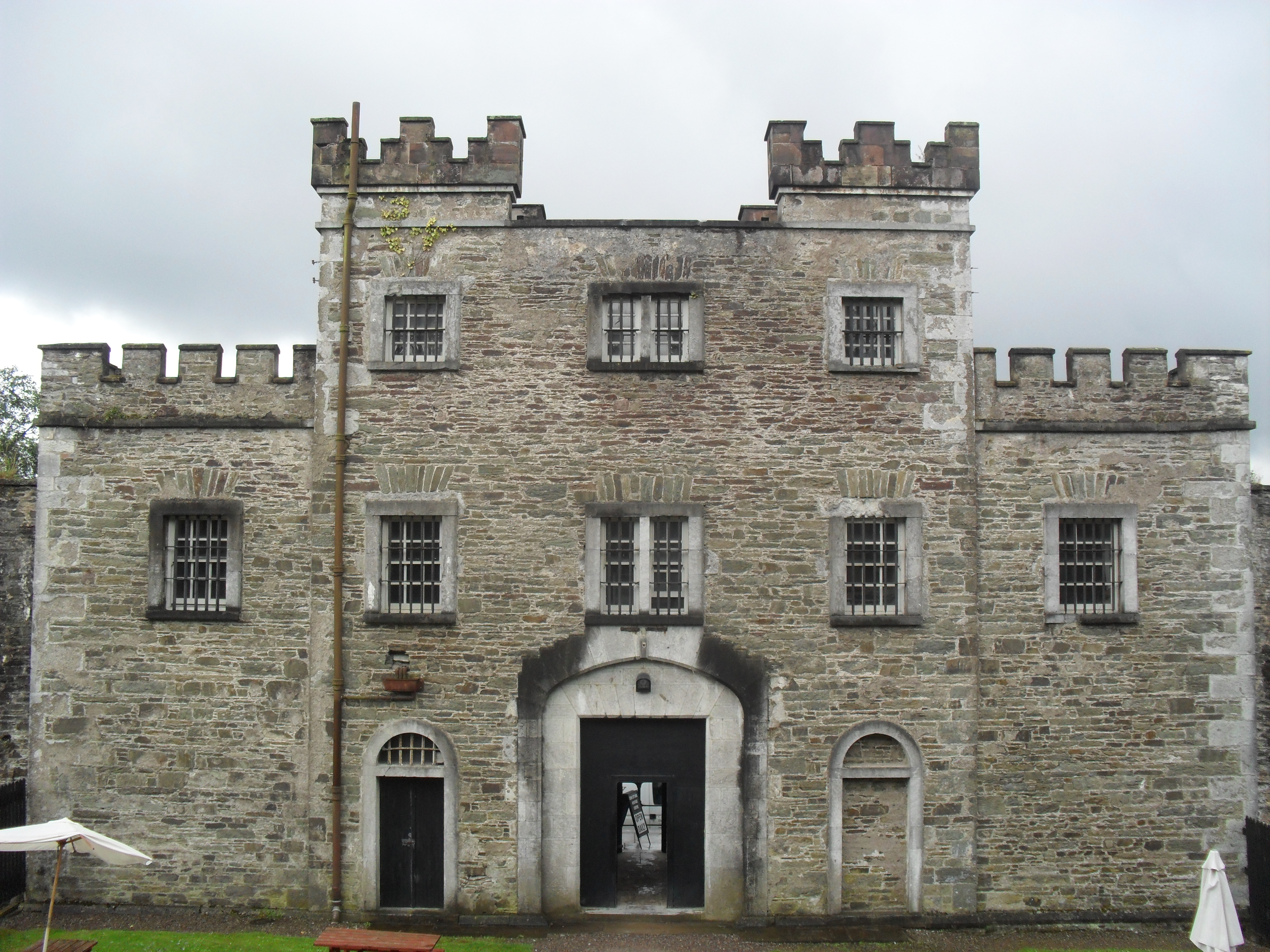

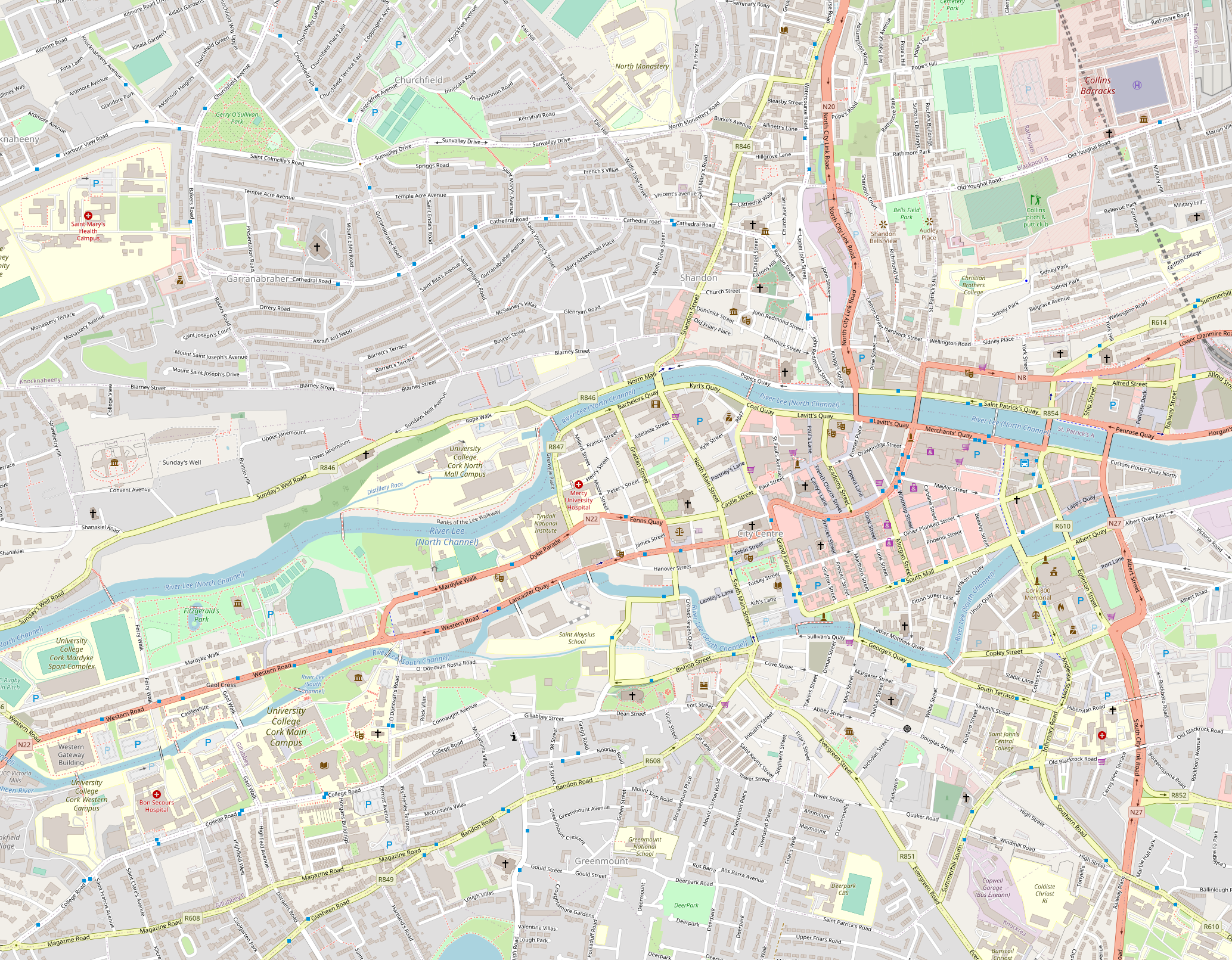
- Location in Cork
- Location: Convent Avenue, Sunday's Well, T23 VX25 Cork; 51.899530°N 8.499022°W
- Status: museum prison
- Opened: 1824
- Closed: August 1923

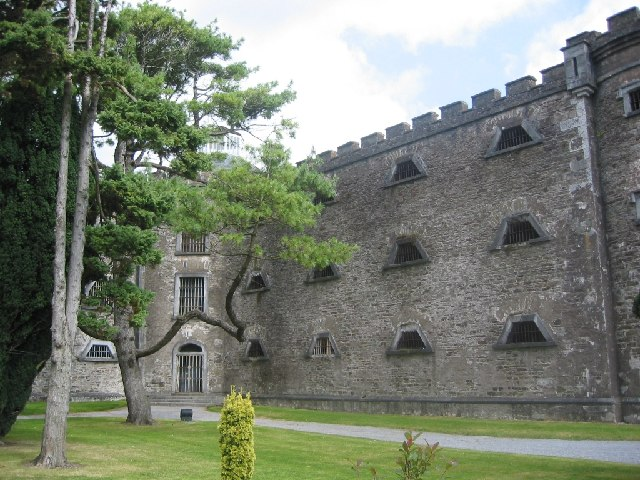

Cork City Gaol is a former prison, now a museum, located in Cork City, Ireland.

== History ==
An act of Parliament, the Cork City Gaol Act 1806 (46 Geo. 3. c. xxxviii), was passed to allow the building of a new Cork City Gaol to replace the old jail at the North Gate Bridge (the old jail, which was nearly 100 years old, was on a confined site and was overcrowded and unhygienic). The first site chosen for the new prison was at distillery fields, but this site was later deemed to be unsuitable because it was prone to flooding. A site on Sunday's Well was eventually chosen, its altitude being seen as an advantage for containing "jail fever" (typhus). The site, its approach roads and perimeters was commenced in 1816 and the building of the prison proper started in 1818.

The building was designed by William Robertson of Kilkenny and built by the Deane family. The famous sculptor John Hogan worked on the building as a draughtsman.

== Description ==
The new Cork City Gaol opened in 1824 and was reported as being "the finest in 3 kingdoms". In 1870, the west wing was remodelled into a double-sided cell wing.

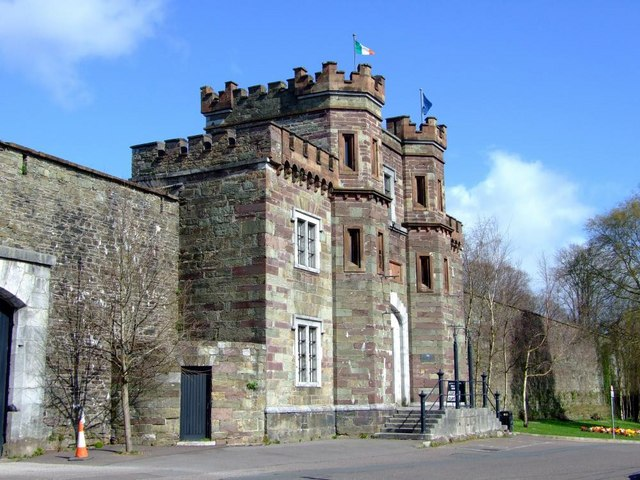
Gaol gatehouse

== City jail ==
When the prison opened in the 1820s, it housed both male and female prisoners whose crimes were committed within the city boundary. Those who committed a crime outside that boundary were sent to Cork County Gaol, across the river from the City Gaol near University College Cork.

=== Nineteenth century ===
The Fenian Brian Dillon was remanded at Cork City Gaol when he was arrested in September 1865.

== Women's jail (city and county) ==
The General Prisons (Ireland) Act 1877 (40 & 41 Vict. c. 49) reorganised the prisons in Cork. The Cork City Gaol became a women's jail (for Cork City and Cork County) and the Cork County Gaol near University College Cork became the men's jail (for Cork City and Cork County). On the day the change came into effect, male prisoners were marched out of the Sunday's Well Prison and over to the Western Road Gaol, while the women were marched in the opposite direction.

=== Nineteenth century ===
Many of the prisoners in the late 19th century were repeat offenders locked up for what would not today be imprisonable offences; for example, a woman named Mary Tucker from Rathmore in County Cork was imprisoned at least three times between 1849 and 1908, sometimes for offences such as 'Obscene Language' or 'Drunkenness'.

=== Twentieth century ===
During the Irish War of Independence Republican women prisoners were imprisoned in the jail.

In October 1919, Constance Markievicz, the first woman to be elected to the British Parliament, was imprisoned at Cork Gaol for making a seditious speech.

In January 1919, another member of Cumann na mBan, Mary Bowles, was imprisoned for arms offences. Later that month a Republican prisoner named Dolly Burke escaped from the prison.

== Civil War ==
In 1922 and 1923, the prison was opened to male and female Republican (anti-treaty) prisoners of the Irish Civil War.

One of those imprisoned at the time was the writer Frank O'Connor.

A spectacular escape was made from the jail in November 1923. The escapees were high-value prisoners who had been sent to the jail as it was "the safest place to hold them". Some men had feigned illness on the night preceding the escape. A rope ladder was made to scale the outer wall, and bed clothes were used to descend to the ground by night. After the prisoners had lowered themselves to the ground inside the wall, they had to huddle in its shadow in sight of a sentry. The position of the moon at a certain hour had to be estimated in order to conceal the movements of the men in the shadows. They went in batches of fourteen as that was the number that could fit in the shadow of the wall, the most wanted men being given preference in order of the serious nature of their charges. All the men in the first batch were liable to the death penalty and cast lots for the order in line. When number nine went over the wall some noise attracted the sentry, and he made movements which caused the prisoner to balk. After a few moments silence, the action was resumed, and three batches amounting to forty two men, escaped with a lapse of fifteen minutes between each batch. It was a frosty night and they had to travel in stockinged feet. Some of those who escaped were natives of Cork City and got clear of there before daylight, but others in the last few batches were recaptured later in the day.

The jail closed in August 1923, with all remaining prisoners either released or transferred to other prisons.

== Post 1923 ==
From 1927 the top floor of the Governor's house was used as a radio broadcasting station by 6CK, the first official radio station in Cork, Ireland. 6CK was succeeded by a national radio station – Radio Éireann (now Raidió Teilifís Éireann), and broadcasting continued at the jail until the 1950s.

Apart from the radio broadcasting and some storage use of the exterior grounds by the Dept, Posts & Telegraphs, the jail complex was allowed to become totally derelict.

== Museum ==
The building reopened to the public as a visitor attraction in 1993.

== Former prisoners ==
- Brian Dillon, 1865
- Constance Markievicz, 1919
- Frank O'Connor (born Michael Francis O'Connor O'Donovan), 1923
