= Brian Dillon =

Irish Republican (1830–1872)

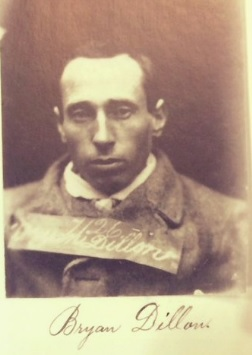
- Born: 1830; Glanmire, County Cork, Ireland
- Died: 17 August 1872 (aged 41–42); Cork, Ireland
- Other name: Bryan Dillon
- Movement: Irish Republican Brotherhood

Brian Dillon (also spelled Bryan Dillon) (1830 – 17 August 1872) was an Irish republican leader and a member of the Irish Republican Brotherhood. He was a central figure in the Cork Fenian movement. After being arrested in 1865 for felony treason, he was found guilty and sentenced to ten years' penal servitude. Because of poor health condition, he was given amnesty after four and a half years. He returned to Cork and was welcomed enthusiastically but died eighteen months later.

== Early life ==
Dillon was born in Glanmire in 1830. As a child, he was in a serious accident—a heavy fall—which resulted in curvature of the spine, and general ill health.

His family moved to a house near the corner of Old Youghal Road and Ballyhooly Road.

He attended the School of Art for several years and became quite talented with brush and pencil.

He lived through the famine and became an ardent nationalist.

== Fenian involvement ==
Dillon was appointed a Fenian leader in Cork by James Stephens, the head of the Irish Republican Brotherhood.

Under Dillon's supervision the Fenian recruits drilled on the Fair Field and at Rathpeacon and were hoping for a rebellion in 1865 when the Fenians were at their strongest. He often associated with other Cork Fenians such as John J. Geary, James Mountaine and John Lynch. Dillon used to chair the Fenian meetings at Geary's pub.

== Arrest and imprisonment ==
In September 1865, police arrested Fenian leaders James Stephens and O'Donovan Rossa in Dublin, and Brian Dillon in Cork. The police searched Dillon's home and found a pair of field glasses, some drawings, and some incriminating letters sewn into the mattress of his bed.

Dillon was remanded in Cork City Gaol before his trial.

On 18 December, Dillon and another Cork Fenian, John Lynch, were tried together in the dock in Cork Courthouse by Judge Keogh. The charges were primarily based on information provided by an informer named John Warner, an ex-military pensioner. Isaac Butt and Mr Waters represented the defendants. The charges were "in one indictment with having conspired to depose the Queen, &c., and with illegally drilling and being drilled in furtherance of that design". Both were found guilty, based primarily on the testimony of informants although John Warner's account was very weak and unsatisfactory under cross examination. The defendants were sentenced to ten years' penal servitude.

He was brought under armed guard by train from Cork to Dublin and then thrown into Mountjoy Gaol. He spent nearly a month there and suffered a lot from lack of sleep. In January 1866 Dillon and John Sarsfield Casey (the Galtee Boy) were handcuffed together on the tough and rough sea crossing between Kingstown and Holyhead. On arrival at Holyhead they were then taken by train to Pentonville Prison. This was a very cold prison and Dillon became seriously ill in May 1866. He was transferred to the hospital wing of Woking Convict Invalid Prison and this was to be his home for the next four-and-a-half years. Here he became Convict Number 2658.

== Homecoming and death ==
In 1870, after five years imprisonment, a commission was set up to investigate the Fenian prisoners, and on account of his bad health, this commission recommended that Dillon be allowed home to Cork. In January 1871 he was transferred to Millbank Prison London, and two weeks later on 8 February he was set free. The following day he arrived in Dublin and after a few days' rest, he returned to Cork by train. All along the route thousands of people waited on the platforms to greet him, and read special addresses of welcome. The train reached Cork at 8:00 p.m. and even though a carriage and pair were waiting, he was glad to seek refuge in the first covered car he could find, so dense was the crowd all around him, willing to shake his hand. The triumphal procession from the station to his home then began, and the hills all along the route were lighted with tar barrels.

Amid emotional scenes Brian Dillon met his family, and afterwards appeared at one of the windows of the house and thanked the people of Ireland for the great reception he had received everywhere on his journey home to Cork. Brian was now in very poor health and his mother began the task of nursing him. Everything that loving care and money could do was done, and from New York came a cheque for £50 from the generous-hearted O'Donovan Rossa. Other friends too contributed, but all to no avail. On Saturday 17 August 1872, Brian Dillon died at his home, surrounded by his sorrowing relatives.

== Funeral and legacy ==
Dillon's funeral was one of the biggest ever seen in Cork. The cortege was headed by the Barrack Street Band, and at least ten other bands took part. All had their instruments dressed in sombre black. On Monday 18 August, his remains were privately borne to St. Joseph's cemetery, to a temporary resting place, as it was decided to build a vault in the family burial ground in Rathcooney, and this would not be ready for a few days. Later the funeral route travelled from Turners Cross along Anglesea Street, South Mall, Grand Parade, Patrick Street, McCurtain Street and St. Luke's. The funeral procession stopped outside his home and prayers were recited for the repose of the hero's soul. Then the procession moved on towards Ballyvolane, and up the steep hill, towards the graveyard at Rathcooney. On arrival at the newly built tomb, so dense was the crowd that milled around the hearse, that considerable difficulty was experienced in getting the coffin to the grave. Then the priests read the burial service, and in a hushed silence, Canon Freeman asked the entire assembly to kneel and recite the Lord's Prayer aloud. He blessed the grave and the mortal remains of Brian Dillon were lowered to rest. The coffin was then covered, and after Colonel Richard O Sullivan Burke's oration, the crowd quietly dispersed.

Today his name is inscribed in the National Monument on the Grand Parade and in street names like Dillon's Cross, Brian Dillon Park and Brian Dillon Crescent. The Brian Dillons G.A.A. club in the same area of Cork city is also named after him.
