= George Kirwan Carr Lloyd =

English army officer and Sussex landowner

George Kirwan Carr (17 June 1810 – 15 June 1877), who changed his surname to Carr Lloyd in 1855, was an English army officer and Sussex landowner.

== Family and education ==
Carr Lloyd was born in Brighton on 17 June 1810, the youngest son of the Reverend Robert James Carr, then vicar of Brighton, and his wife Nancy. He was educated at Eton College, and matriculated at Christ Church, Oxford in 1828.

He was first married on 15 November 1841 to Caroline, daughter of Sir Michael Seymour Bt KCB, and they had two daughters before she died on 10 September 1843. He was next married on 12 April 1847 to Jane, daughter of John Watson, and they had two daughters and two sons. She died on 27 December 1896.

== Career ==
After serving as a regular officer in the Rifle Brigade in Canada and Malta, he lived in Sussex where he served as a militia officer, being appointed the first Lieutenant-Colonel Commandant of the Royal Sussex Militia Artillery on 26 April 1853. He entered the banking business, becoming a partner in the Brighton Union Bank, later absorbed into Barclays Bank. In 1858 his aunt Elizabeth, widow of Sir James Lloyd Bt MP, left him the estate of Lancing and in 1869 he was chosen as High Sheriff of Sussex.

== Legacy ==
Depressed after the death of his brother-in-law Thomas Baker, rector of Hartlebury, he shot himself at his country house of Lancing Manor, dying there on 15 June 1877. The estate was inherited by his only surviving son, James Martin Carr Lloyd.
