= Charles James Otway =

British Army officer (1694–1764)

General Charles James Otway
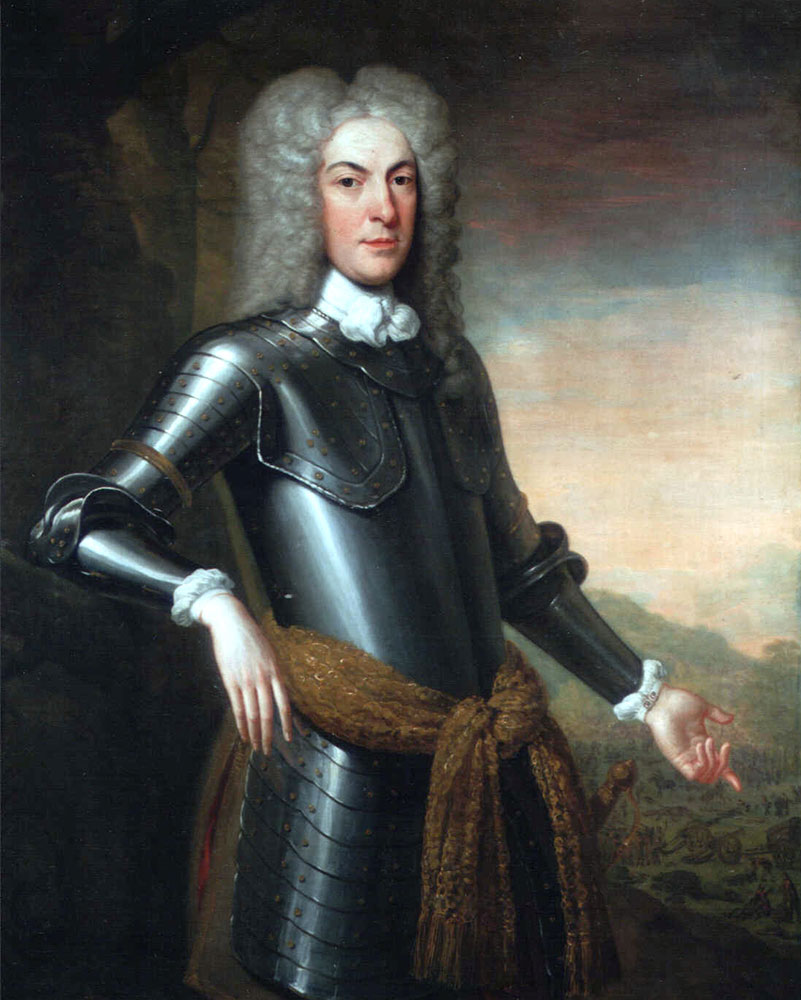
- Portrait by John Smibert, 1724
- Born: 1694
- Died: 6 August 1764 (aged 69–70)

General Charles James Otway (1694 – 6 August 1764) was a British Army officer.

== Military career ==
In 1712, Otway joined Lord Mohun's Regiment of Foot and in 1715 he fought against the Jacobites in the inconclusive Battle of Sherrifmuir. He was colonel of the 35th Regiment of Foot from 1717 until his death in 1764. During this extraordinarily long colonelcy, the Regiment was known as Otway's Foot, even after the practice of identifying regiments by the name of their colonel was officially abolished in 1751.

His promotions were as follows:

- Brigadier-General: 1735
- Major-General: 1739
- Lieutenant-General: 1745
- General: 1761

== Personal life ==
In 1730, Otway married Lady Bridget Fielding, the daughter of the Basil Feilding, 4th Earl of Denbigh. He died on 6 August 1764 and was buried in St Michael's Church in Smarden.

Military offices
Preceded by Richard Gorges	Colonel of the 35th Regiment of Foot; Officially Otway's Foot to 1751; 1717–1764	Succeeded by Henry Fletcher
