= James Hayes Sadler =

British diplomat and civil servant

Sir James Hayes Sadler KCMG CB FRGS
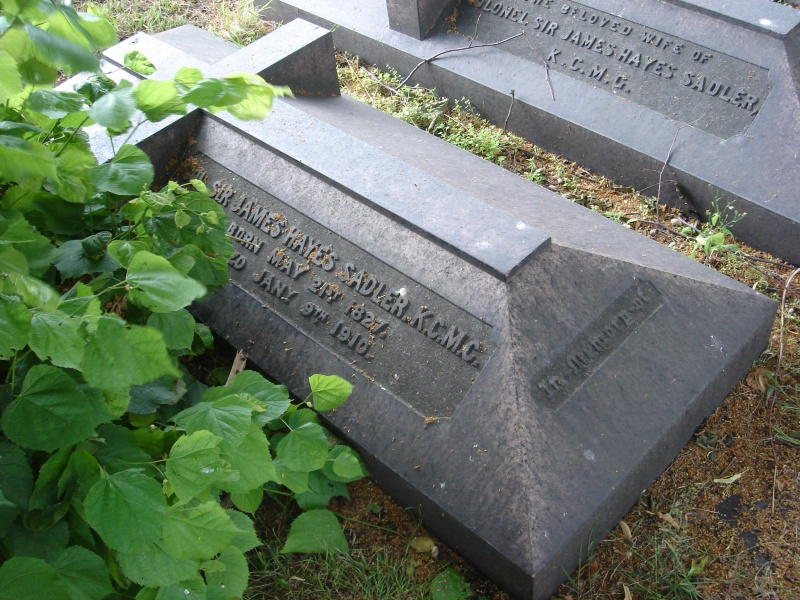
- Funerary monument, Brompton Cemetery, London
- Born: 21 May 1827; Keynsham Bury, Gloucester, England
- Died: 9 January 1910 (aged 82); Kensington, London, England
- Burial place: Brompton Cemetery, London
- Relatives: James Hayes Sadler (son)
- Military career
- Allegiance: United Kingdom
- Branch: British Army
- Service years: 1854–1882
- Rank: Lieutenant Colonel; Colonel (honorary)
- Unit: Royal Sussex Militia Artillery
- Awards: KCMG (1899)

Colonel Sir James Hayes Sadler KCMG CB FRGS (21 May 1827 – 9 January 1910) was a British diplomat and civil servant.

== Early life and education ==
Sadler was born to the Reverend James-Hayes Sadler (5 January 1785 – 26 August 1845) and Anne Sadler (née Rich, died 27 September 1847) in Keynsham Bury, Gloucester, England. He was educated at Eton and Oxford.

== Career ==
In 1854 Sadler was commissioned into the Royal Sussex Militia Artillery, a newly formed part-time home defence unit of the Royal Artillery (RA). (It was retitled the 3rd Brigade, Cinque Ports Division, RA, in 1882 and Sussex Artillery (Eastern Division) RA in 1889, before becoming the Sussex Royal Garrison Artillery (Militia) in 1902.). He was promoted lieutenant the following year and captain in 1858. He was promoted to hnorary major in 1874, and full major and honorary lieutenant-colonel in 1879. He resigned his commission in 1882, and was appointed honorary colonel of the unit.

Following his retirement from the militia, Sadler became a diplomat. Following a term as Consul in Panama, he became Consul, based at Chicago, for most of the Midwestern American States in 1887. After serving as Consul-General in Valparaiso, Chile from 1895 he was made a Knight Commander of the Order of St Michael and St George (KCMG) in the 1899 New Year Honours. He was elected a Fellow of the Royal Geographical Society in 1896 as "Hayes-Sadler."

Sadler died in 1910, and is buried in Brompton Cemetery, London. On 17 December 1850, he had married Sophia Jane Taylor (24 September 1823 – 12 February 1902), who died on 12 February 1902, and is buried next to him. Their son, also named Sir James Hayes Sadler (1851–1922) was a colonial administrator, who also a military man and was also awarded the KCMG.
