= James Mountaine =

Irish Nationalist, "Young Irelander" and Fenian

James Mountaine (c1819-1868) was an Irish Nationalist, "Young Irelander" and Fenian who lived in Cork, Ireland. For the first twenty years of his life, he spelled his name James Mountain. He was a supporter of Daniel O’Connell and the Irish liberation movement. As an adult he resided at 72 North Main Street, Cork, which has since been demolished, and worked as a shoe-maker. He was involved in the Fenian movement and imprisoned multiple times. By the time of his death, James Mountaine was a well known nationalist.

== Early adult life ==
Mountaine was involved in the Cork Confederate Club, Cork National Reading Rooms, as well as the Brotherhood of St. Patrick.

As part of a group of shoe-makers accused of assault, James Mountaine was first imprisoned in 1848. They allegedly assaulted fellow shoe-maker John M'Donnell over a depute about regulations of their trade. After the accuser failed to appear in court, the case was dismissed and the defendant being bound to keep the peace for 12 months.

== Later life ==
The marriage of the Prince of Wales (later Edward VII) and Alexandra of Denmark on 10 March 1863 was an occasion for loyalist celebrations in Cork. Houses and shops had their windows illuminated. This increased nationalistic unrest, with windows being smashed and the mayor being roughly handled. Several rioters were prosecuted, including Mountaine. The trial started on 23 March with the charge of inciting the mob of 500 people and property damage. This was held immediately after John Lynch's trial over the same incident. Both were acquitted.

On 5 November 1863, he was seen on a ship to the United States by Irish police. Mountaine claimed that the purpose of the trip was to find his lost son, a surgeon in New York, after many requests from his wife. His search was successful. In December, he was seen in New York by the informant Pearce Nagle visiting the offices of John O'Mahony, a founding member of the Fenian Brotherhood in the United States. His stay in the country was less than three months. He carried a letter of recommendation from James Stephens, a founding member of what went on to be the Irish Republican Brotherhood, to John O'Mahony, which was published after his death:

Brother — The bearer, Mr. James Mountaine, is a friend, though paying but a flying visit to America (he is going to see his son, a surgeon in New York, and will stay but six weeks or so in the States), it would grieve him to leave, without taking your hand in his. When in yours, you should grasp that hand firmy, for it is that of as brave and true an Irishman as you know. He is one of the few who, with a good deal to lose, as the saying is, still clings to the cause as of old — nay, as years and prospects increase, they but add to his zeal and devotion. He is one of the few, too, who are sure to rally round me in times of trial — whose friendship is shown at need, in better coin than words. It is now some time since I asked you for a favor. In the present instance I do so, and request that you will show Mr. Mountaine all the consideration in your power. All that he expects and would accept, is that you should receive him as a brother, and speak of him as a man who is at all times ready to fight or die for Ireland. For my part, I would gladly go out of my way, to meet and welcome, and be a brother to such a man. Mr. Mountaine would, I am sure, be delighted to see some of our military friends in their element; and, should an opportunity offer, I bespeak for Mr. Mountaine every attention you can pay him. Yours as ever, fraternally, J. Power.

From 1864, the movements of Fenian leaders were closely watched by police, including John J. Geary's pub, which was often frequented by Mountaine, Brian Dillon and John Lynch.

Mountaine was arrested on 5 Oct 1865 in the general purge of Fenian leaders. About 11 AM, twenty police arrived at Mountaine's shop. A large crowd gathered to find the cause of police presence. The property was searched for incriminating documents and Mountaine was taken away in handcuffs after an hour. Mountaine walked in a defiant manner as some of the crowd cheered, clapped in sympathy and wept. The police left with a parcel of evidence from the house.

On 27 December 1865, he was charged under the Treason Felony Act 1848. The trial on the next day was conducted by the Special Commission. Evidence was given that he associated with conspirators John O'Mahony, John J. Geary and Brian Dillon. Police claim they saw Mountaine talking to Fenian leader James Stephens in April 1864, although they could not hear the conversation. The police had found the Chicago statement, a nationalist pamphlet written in America, as well as a copy of "Biggs' Military Resources of Ireland" at his home. On Mountaine's son was found book of poetry with the inscription "James Mountaine, Esq., Fenian Brotherhood". A request for a letter of introduction for Richard O'Leary to John O'Mahony was found on his person. Police said they saw Mountaine on 1 June on a tender to a ship to the United States talking to Callaghan O'Reardon, with Mountaine wishing O'Reardan's return, although the meaning of the remark was quite ambiguous. Mountaine was defended by Isaac Butt and Mr Waters. They argued that the charge was conspiracy to overthrow the Queen, but his association with members of the Fenian brotherhood did not itself establish his guilt. They claimed that no overt act was committed by Mountaine and all evidence presented was circumstantial and inconclusive. The handwriting of the book inscription was questioned, as was the authenticity and relevance of the request for a letter of recommendation. Mountaine was acquitted after the jury deliberated for a quarter of an hour. The announcement was accompanied by some applause, which was quickly suppressed. Cheering was also heard in the courthouse from the street as Mountaine left the building.

== Imprisonment, release and death ==
1867 saw the Fenian Rising. In response, habeas corpus was suspended and Mountaine imprisoned again, although eventually released without trial. His eldest son James Mountaine Jr. died on 4 April 1868. Not long after, James Mountaine Sr. died in November 1868 after a six-week illness.

His funeral was one of the largest ever seen in the city, with an estimated ten to fifteen thousand in the procession. He is buried at Saint Joseph's Cemetery (then called Mathew Cemetery). He is commemorated on the National Monument, as well as a plaque near where his house stood.
