= Woking Convict Invalid Prison =

Former prison in Surrey, England

Woking Convict Invalid Prison was constructed in mid-19th-century England, primarily to hold male invalid convicts who previously had been billeted on hulks and had been moved to the temporary invalid prison at Lewes. The concept of a prison specifically for invalids was seen as progressive at the time.

It opened its doors to the first prisoner, William Strahan, in April 1859 and formally received the first tranche of invalid prisoners in March 1860. The prison closed in 1889 due to a decline in the number of invalid prisoners.

== Construction ==
In 1852 an Act of Parliament was passed to allow the London Necropolis and Mausoleum Company to purchase 2,200 acres of land to the west of Woking from the Earl of Onslow.

This was to be the site of a large new cemetery that was expected to hold over 28 million bodies. The site was opened in 1854. By 1857 the company was reporting significant losses and attempting to economise. They had decided to reduce the number of staff, and put extra efforts into securing expensive sales from high-profile burials. At its annual general meeting in February 1858, the company reported that money was due from the government for land already sold to them, but which had not been paid for yet.

Joshua Jebb, the Surveyor-General of Convict Prisons, earmarked this land as a suitable site for his newly conceived Invalid Convict Prison. On 28 April 1859 the one wing of the prison was considered complete enough to house prisoners, at which point 94 were transferred from the temporary invalid prison at Lewes. Work continued with the building of the prison whilst the inmates were in situ. Reports state that throughout the construction, as many as 200 men were working on the building at any given time, and post April 1994 of those were convicts.

On 26 October 1861, The Hon. Spencer Walpole laid the foundation stone for the prison chapel, in the company of Jebb and various officials from Mr Myers' company who were tasked with the construction of the whole.

== History ==
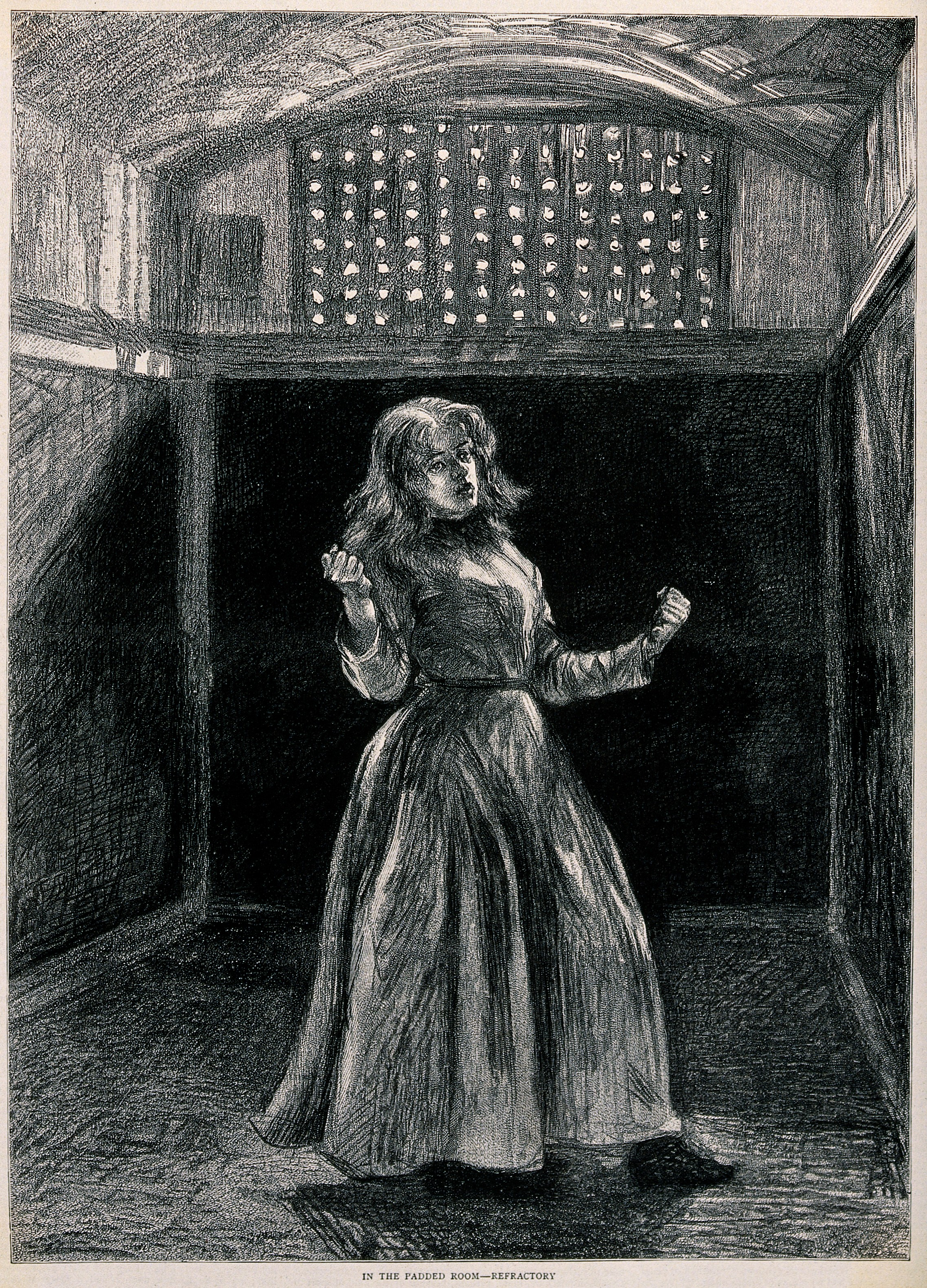
An innate of the prison, in a padded cell

By 1852 the government was already in discussion about whether the use of transportation as punishment was a viable option for criminals in future. Joshua Jebb's 1852 report on ‘Discipline & Management of convict prisons and disposal’ went into detail about the comparative costs of transportation against maintaining prison accommodation in England. The existing process for prisoners with long sentences was:

1. 12 months of separate (solitary) confinement.

2. Labour on public works.

3. Ticket of leave in a colony followed by a pardon, conditional or otherwise dependent on crime, character, and behaviour throughout the sentence.

With the end of transportation in sight, the process for inmates undertaking public works overseas, and those invalided before or during their sentence, needed a significant review. A new idea formed, that after the period of separation, prisoners would be sent to larger district prisons to carry out the remainder of their sentence engaged in works for the good of the country.

These prisons, it was suggested, should be built using public funds and “Between 1842 and 1877, 90 prisons were built or added to”.

During the later years of transportation, prison hulks such as the Defence and the Stirling Castle were utilised to confine inmates considered “invalid” or too weak to undertake any public works. On 14 July 1857 the Defence spontaneously caught fire and had to be scuttled to prevent further damage. The 150 prisoners on board were transferred to Millbank, and then to a temporary holding facility at Lewes Prison.

Throughout this time, Joshua Jebb conceived a plan to hold all inmates of an invalid type in a single prison unit, to allow for better care and concentrate all costs in one area.

The formal opening of the prison was in 1860 which started the transfer of prisoners to the newly constructed Woking from Lewes. The Governor, John Sandham Warren, from the Defence & Lewes Temporary Invalid Prison, moved with the prisoners to Woking and oversaw Woking Prison as governor until 1865.

From 1862, the healthy inmates of Woking were engaged in the building of Broadmoor Criminal Asylum.

== Description ==
The prison covered 63 acres and was documented, during construction, as expecting a wall 18 feet high. It held, on average, 650 inmates at any one time and contained both a hospital ward and an insane inmate ward.

== Later developments ==
In 1889 the prison was closed down and all remaining inmates were transferred to Dartmoor, Broadmoor and other surrounding prisons. In the 1890s the plot was taken over by the military and renamed Inkerman Barracks. Over the succeeding decades, various regiments were hosted at the barracks, including military police and a war hospital.

In the 1970s the site was purchased by Woking Borough Council who began demolition to make way for a new residential area. The street names, such as Raglan Road and Inkerman Way, reflect its military history.

== Notable inmates ==
The prison was home to many notable inmates during its tenure, including:

- William Strahan, who was the inspiration for Charles Dickens' Little Dorrit and instigator of the first Oxford v. Cambridge boat race
- Charles Kickham, a noted Irish author and republican
- John Lynch, a Fenian who died at the prison
- Ricard O'Sullivan Burke, Irish Republican Brotherhood Fenian
- Brian Dillon, Fenian leader.

== See also ==
- Inkerman Barracks
