= Inkerman Barracks =

- Knaphill, Surrey
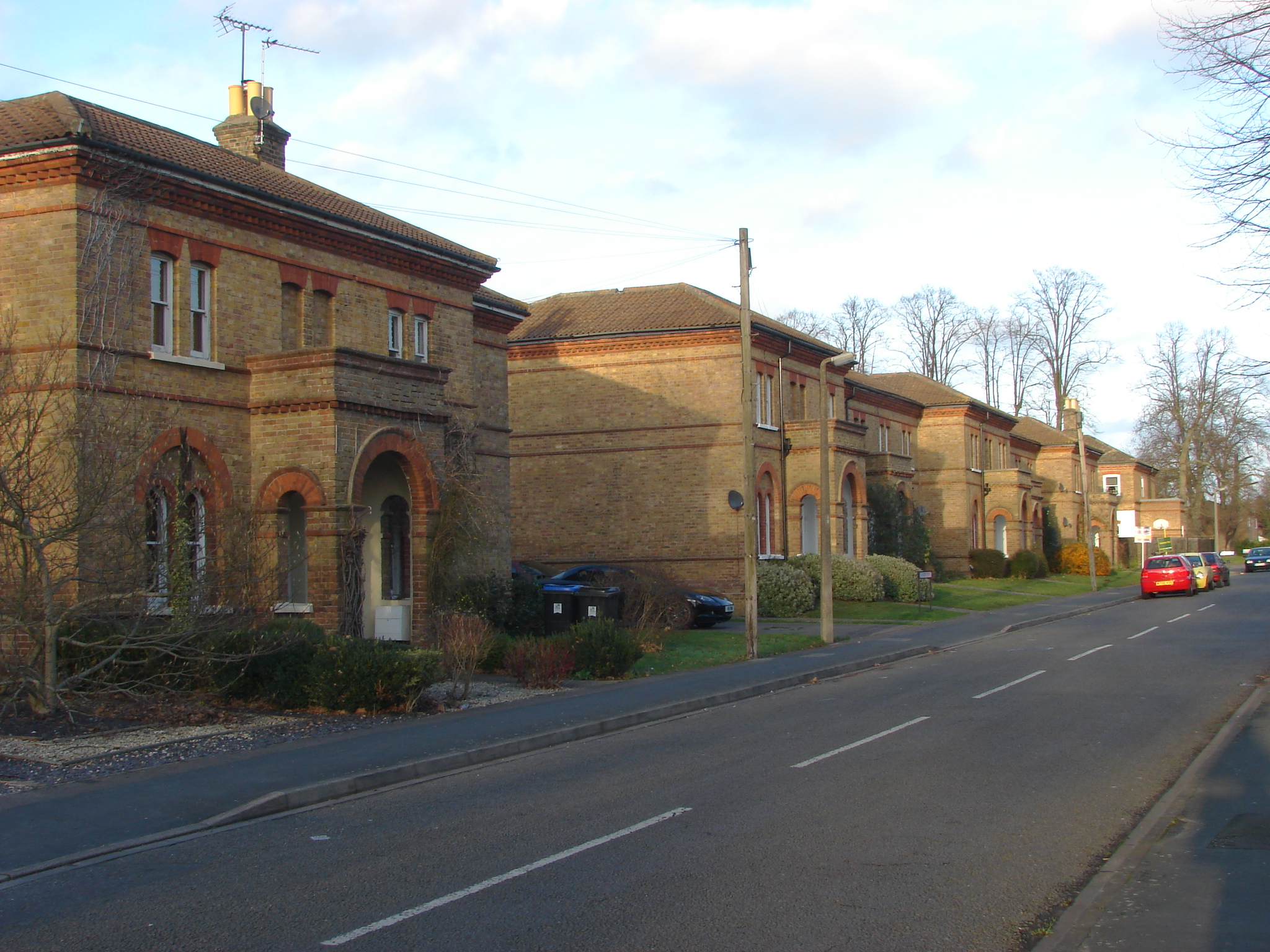
- Military accommodation on Raglan Road, all that remains of Inkerman Barracks

Site information
- Type: Barracks

Location
- Location within Surrey
- Coordinates: 51.3156°N 0.6050°W

Site history
- Built: 1869
- Built for: War Office
- In use: 1892–1970

Inkerman Barracks was a military establishment on Raglan Terrace, Knaphill, Surrey, England.

== History ==
The facilities on the 65-acre site were originally constructed in 1869 as a prison for disabled convicts known as the Woking Convict Invalid Prison. The prison had 613 inmates, both male and female, by 1870. The buildings were converted into barracks capable of accommodating two infantry battalions in 1892 and initially became the home of the 2nd Battalion, the Royal West Surrey Regiment. The barracks were named after the Battle of Inkerman, a conflict during the Crimean War.

The Royal Military Police, who had previously been based at a hutted camp at Mytchett, made it their depot in 1947. It remained the location for all military police training until a new depot was established at Roussillon Barracks in Chichester in 1964. After the barracks closed in 1970, the site was sold to the local council and developed for residential use.
