= Roussillon Barracks =

Former barracks in Chichester, England

- Chichester
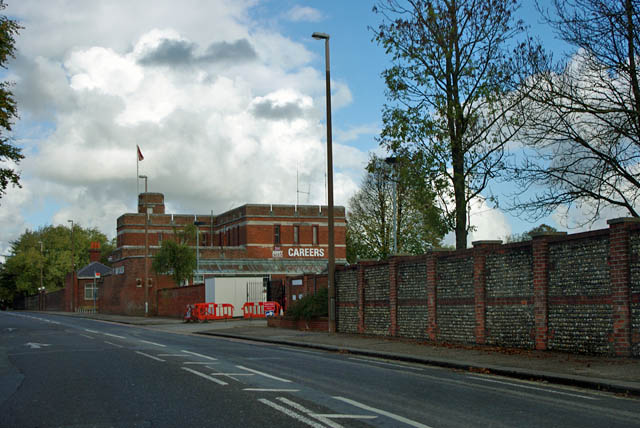
- Roussillon Barracks

Site information
- Type: Barracks
- Owner: Ministry of Defence
- Operator: British Army

Location
- Location within West Sussex
- Coordinates: 50.85094°N 0.78001°W

Site history
- Built: 1795
- Built for: War Office
- In use: 1795-2005

Garrison information
- Occupants: Royal Sussex Regiment; Royal Military Police

Roussillon Barracks was a military installation in Chichester.

== History ==
The barracks were originally established as part of the British response to the threat of the French Revolution in tented accommodation in 1795 and were enhanced by the use of wooden huts in 1803. In 1873 a system of recruiting areas based on counties was instituted under the Cardwell Reforms and the barracks became the depot for the 35th (Royal Sussex) Regiment of Foot, the 107th (Bengal Infantry) Regiment of Foot and the Royal Sussex Light Infantry Militia. The keep, built in the Fortress Gothic Revival Style, and chapel were added in 1875. Following the Childers Reforms, the three regiments amalgamated to form the Royal Sussex Regiment in 1881, with its depot in the barracks.

Further enhancements to the barracks took place in the 1930s when the wooden huts were removed. The name of the barracks, given in 1958, commemorates the actions of the 35th (Royal Sussex) Regiment of Foot in putting the Regiment Royal Roussillon to flight at the Battle of the Plains of Abraham during the Seven Years' War. The barracks were demoted to the status of out-station to the Home Counties Brigade depot at Howe Barracks in Canterbury in 1959.

Extensive building took place from 1960 until 1964 to accommodate the Royal Military Police who arrived from Inkerman Barracks and took over the site in 1964. Lieutenant-Commander Alfredo Astiz, an Argentine commander, was questioned at the barracks in June 1982 about the murder of Swedish and French nationals. The Royal Military Police left the site in September 2005 and planning permission for housing was granted in 2011.

The former guardroom and gatehouse known as The Keep was retained as an army careers office and, after a period of it not being used, it was transferred to the reserve estate.

As a result, in 2019, the building was converted for use as a Joint Cadet Centre and began to host a detachment of the Sussex Army Cadet Force (No. 7 Chichester Detachment).
