= John Lynch (Fenian) =

Irish Fenian

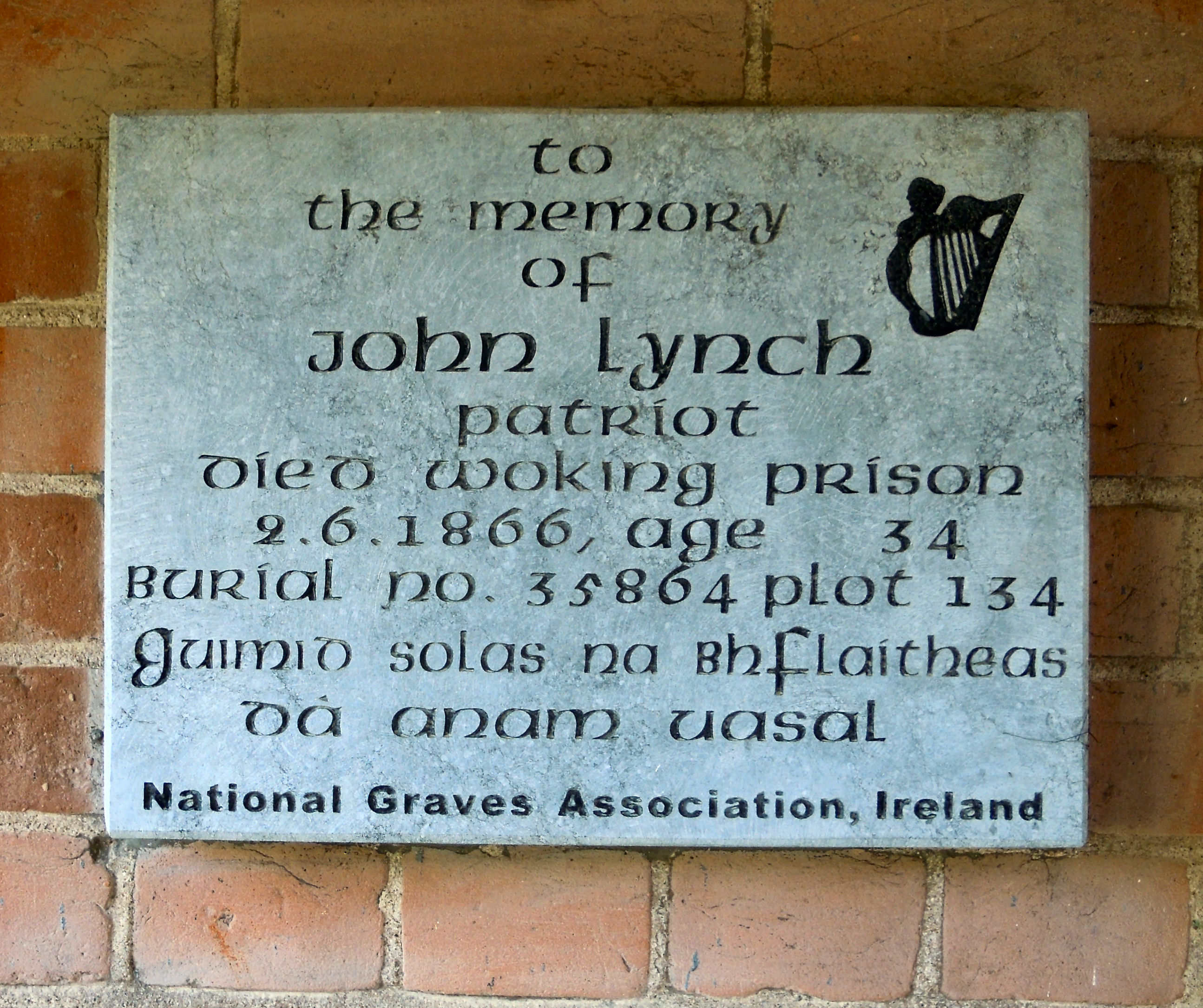
Memorial Plaque to Lynch at Brookwood Cemetery

John Lynch (c. 1832 − 2 June 1866) was an Irish nationalist. He was a resident of the city of Cork and an alleged member of the Irish Republican Brotherhood.

John was very active in the early days of the Cork Fenian movement. He organised nationalist celebrations on St. Patrick's night 1862 at the Athenaeum club, Cork. Lynch worked as an accountant.

The marriage of the Prince of Wales (later Edward VII) and Alexandra of Denmark on 10 March 1863 was an occasion for loyalist celebrations in Cork. Houses and shops had their windows illuminated. This increased nationalistic unrest, with windows being smashed and the mayor being roughly handled. Several rioters were prosecuted, including Lynch and James Mountaine. Both were acquitted due to lack of evidence.

He was again arrested in Sept 1865, as part of the general purge of Fenian leaders, based on information provided by John Warner, an ex-military pensioner. The trial of John Lynch and co-defendant Brian Dillon starting on 18 December 1865 with Isaac Butt as their legal counsel. The charges were "in one indictment with having conspired to depose the Queen, &c., and with illegally drilling and being drilled in furtherance of that design". Lynch was accused of being a captain (denoted as "B") in the Irish Republican Brotherhood. Both were found guilty, based primarily on the testimony of informants although John Warner's account was very weak and unsatisfactory under cross examination. At this time, John Lynch was seriously ill from tuberculosis. At his sentencing, John disputed the testimony of John Warner, saying he had never learned to use a rifle and said "If, having served my country honestly and sincerely be treason, I am not ashamed of it. I am now prepared to receive any punishment British law can inflict on me." Both defendants were sentenced to 10 years' penal servitude.

In January 1866, he was transferred from Mountjoy Prison, Dublin to Pentonville Prison, London where the conditions were very harsh. Because of his condition, he was transferred to Woking Prison hospital, Surrey, where he died on 2 June 1866 recordedly aged 34. He is commemorated on the National Memorial in the city of Cork and at Brookwood Cemetery, UK where he is buried.
