= Royal Sussex Militia Artillery =

British Militia unit

Royal Sussex Militia Artillery 3rd Brigade, Cinque Ports Division, RA Sussex Artillery (Eastern Division) RA Sussex Royal Garrison Artillery (M)
- Active: 9 April 1853–1909
- Country: United Kingdom
- Branch: Militia
- Role: Garrison Artillery
- Part of: Cinque Ports Division, RA (1882–89); Eastern Division, RA (1889–1902)
- Garrison/HQ: Lewes (1853–1883); Eastbourne (1883–1909)

Commanders
- Colonel of the Regiment: Charles Gordon-Lennox, 5th Duke of Richmond, KG (1853–60); Sir James Hayes Sadler, KCMG, FRGS (1882–1909)

The Royal Sussex Militia Artillery was a part-time reserve unit of Britain's Royal Artillery from the County of Sussex, which served from 1853 to 1909.

== Background ==
The long-standing national Militia of the United Kingdom was revived by the Militia Act 1852, enacted during a period of international tension. As before, units were raised and administered on a county basis, and filled by voluntary enlistment (although conscription by means of the Militia Ballot might be used if the counties failed to meet their quotas). Training was for 56 days on enlistment, then for 21–28 days per year, during which the men received full army pay. Under the Act, Militia units could be embodied by Royal Proclamation for full-time home defence service in three circumstances:

1. 'Whenever a state of war exists between Her Majesty and any foreign power'.
2. 'In all cases of invasion or upon imminent danger thereof'.
3. 'In all cases of rebellion or insurrection'.

The 1852 Act introduced Artillery Militia units in addition to the traditional infantry regiments. Their role was to man coastal defences and fortifications, relieving the Royal Artillery (RA) for active service.

== History ==
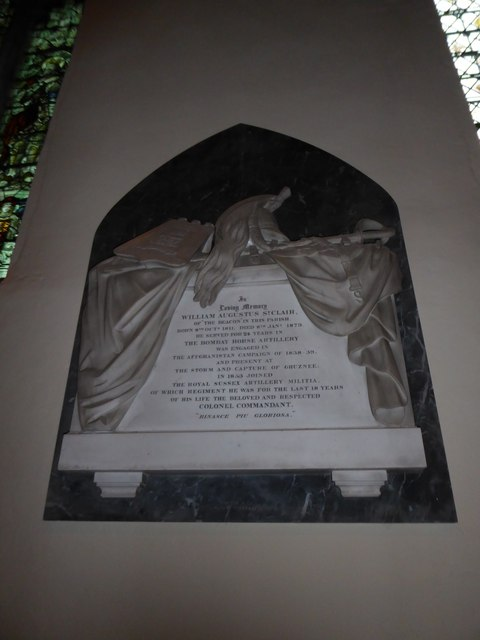
Memorial to Lt-Col William St Clair in St Peter and St Paul Church, Lingfield, Surrey, detailing his service with the Bombay Horse Artillery and the Royal Sussex Militia Artillery.

The Royal Sussex Militia Artillery was raised in April 1853 by transferring 206 volunteers from the Royal Sussex Light Infantry Militia. The first commandant was Lieutenant-Colonel George Kirwan Carr Lloyd, a former captain in the Rifle Brigade. The Colonel-in-Chief was Charles Gordon-Lennox, 5th Duke of Richmond KG, who had been Colonel of the Royal Sussex Militia since 1819. Several of the other early officers were retired from the British or East India Company's armies, or prominent personages in the county, including Captains Sir James Sibbald David Scott, 3rd Baronet, and the Hon. William E. Sackville-West, son of Earl De La Warr. The unit's Major was William Augustus St Clair, formerly of the Bombay Horse Artillery, who succeeded at Lt-Col Commandant on 2 May 1861.

The new corps' headquarters was established at Lewes, the county town of East Sussex, until November 1883 when it moved to Eastbourne. The unit consisted of five batteries.

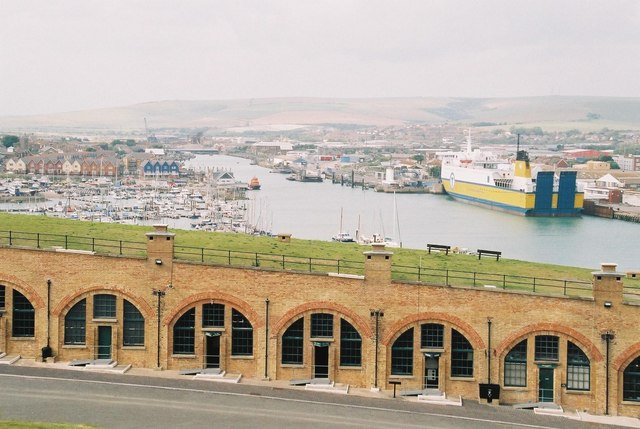
Newhaven Fort overlooking the harbour today.

In the Mobilisation Scheme developed in the 1870s, the Royal Sussex Militia Artillery's war station was at Newhaven, East Sussex.

The Artillery Militia was reorganised into 11 divisions of garrison artillery in 1882, and the Sussex unit joined the Cinque Ports Division, taking the title of 3rd Brigade, Cinque Ports Division, RA. When the Cinque Ports Division was abolished in 1889 its militia were transferred to the Eastern Division and the unit's title was altered to Sussex Artillery (Eastern Division) RA.

From 1899 the Militia artillery formally became part of the Royal Garrison Artillery (RGA), and when the RGA abolished the divisional structure the Eastbourne unit took the title of Sussex RGA (M) on 1 January 1902.

== Embodiments ==
The unit was embodied for home defence twice:

- Crimean War: 1 February 1855 to 16 June 1856
- Second Boer War: 1 May to 17 October 1900

== Disbandment ==
After the Boer War, the future of the Militia was called into question. There were moves to reform the Auxiliary Forces (Militia, Yeomanry and Volunteers) to take their place in the six Army Corps proposed by St John Brodrick as Secretary of State for War. Some batteries of Militia Artillery were to be converted to field artillery. However, little of Brodrick's scheme was carried out.

Under the sweeping Haldane Reforms of 1908, the Militia was replaced by the Special Reserve, a semi-professional force whose role was to provide reinforcement drafts for Regular units serving overseas in wartime. Although the majority of the officers and men of the Sussex RGA (M) accepted transfer to the Special Reserve Royal Field Artillery and the unit became the Sussex Royal Field Reserve Artillery on 24 May 1908, all these units were disbanded in March 1909. Instead the men of the RFA Special Reserve would form Brigade Ammunition Columns for the Regular RFA brigades on the outbreak of war.

== Uniform and insignia ==
In 1854 the officers of the Royal Sussex Militia Artillery wore a black leather helmet carrying a plate bearing the star of the Order of the Garter with the cross of St George picked out in red with crossed gilt cannons below. A scroll beneath was inscribed 'ROYAL SUSSEX MILITIA'. After 1882 the officers wore the standard gilt Cinque Ports Division helmet plate.

== Equipment ==
An engraved print of June 1854 shows the Royal Sussex Militia Artillery at gun practice at Southover, Lewes. The guns shown include two 32-pounder muzzle-loaders on traversing carriages. The wooden gun shed from which they are shooting has mock fortress embrasures facing the firing range over the South Downs.

== Honorary Colonels ==
The following served as colonel of the unit:

- Charles Gordon-Lennox, 5th Duke of Richmond KG, appointed Colonel-in-Chief on the unit's formation.
- Sir James Hayes Sadler, KCMG, FRGS, an officer of the unit from 1854 to 1882, was appointed Honorary Colonel on 5 August 1882 and held the post until its disbandment.
