= 107th Regiment of Foot (Bengal Light Infantry) =

- Active: 1765–1798; 1854–1881
- Country: East India Company (1765–1858); United Kingdom (1858–1881)
- Branch: Bengal Army (1765–1862); British Army (1862–1881)
- Type: Infantry
- Size: One battalion (two battalions 1779–1781)
- Garrison/HQ: Roussillon Barracks, Chichester
- Engagements: Indian Rebellion

The 107th (Bengal Infantry) Regiment of Foot was an infantry regiment of the British Army, raised by the East India Company in 1765. Under the Childers Reforms, it amalgamated with the 35th (Royal Sussex) Regiment of Foot to form the Royal Sussex Regiment.

== History ==
=== Early history ===
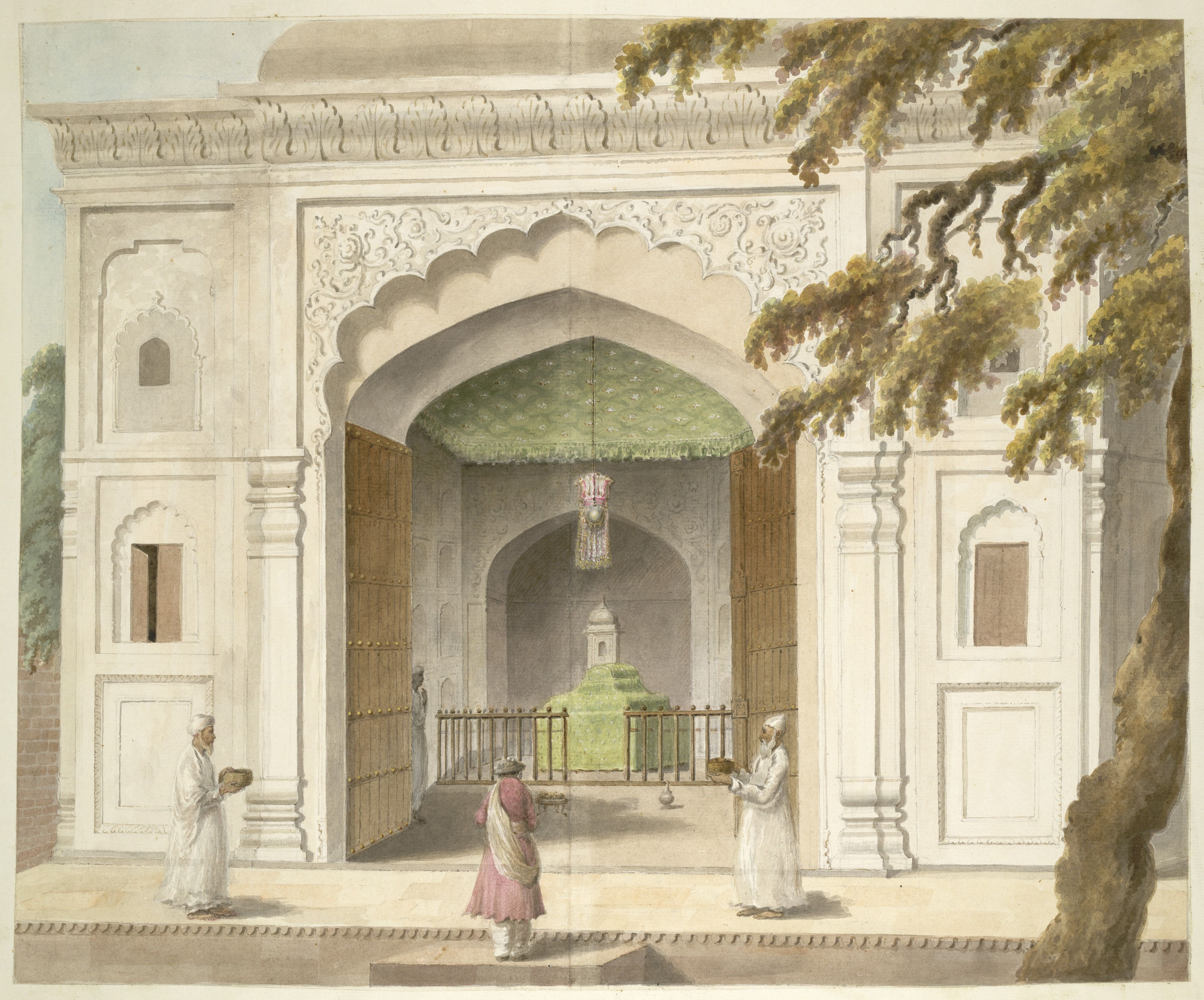
The mausoleum of Hafiz Rahmat Khan Barech, Regent of Rohilkhand, at Bareilly, India

The regiment was first raised by the East India Company as the 3rd Bengal European Regiment of the Bengal Army, being formed from the 1st Bengal European Regiment in 1765. It went to take part in an action at Rohilkhand in April 1774 during the First Rohilla War. It served in India until it was absorbed by the 1st and 2nd Bengal Europeans in 1798.

=== The Victorian era ===
The regiment was re-raised as the 3rd Bengal (European) Light Infantry in 1854 and then saw action in India in 1857 during the Indian Rebellion. After the Crown took control of the Presidency armies in the aftermath of the Indian Rebellion, the regiment became the 3rd Bengal Light Infantry in November 1859. It was then renumbered as the 107th Regiment of Foot (Bengal Light Infantry) on transfer to the British Army in September 1862. It embarked for England in 1875.

As part of the Cardwell Reforms of the 1870s, where single-battalion regiments were linked together to share a single depot and recruiting district in the United Kingdom, the 107th was linked with the 35th (Royal Sussex) Regiment of Foot, and assigned to district no. 43 at Roussillon Barracks in Chichester. On 1 July 1881 the Childers Reforms came into effect and the regiment amalgamated with the 35th (Royal Sussex) Regiment of Foot to form the Royal Sussex Regiment.

The regiment had no battle honours.

== Regimental Colonels ==
Colonels of the Regiment were:

3rd Bengal Light Infantry

- 1862: Maj-Gen. George Huyshe, CB

107th Regiment of Foot (Bengal Light Infantry) (British Army)

- 1862–1868: Gen. Sir George Petre Wymer, KCB
- 1868–1873: Lt-Gen. William James D'Urban
- 1873–1881: Gen. Hon. Arthur Upton
