= 35th (Royal Sussex) Regiment of Foot =

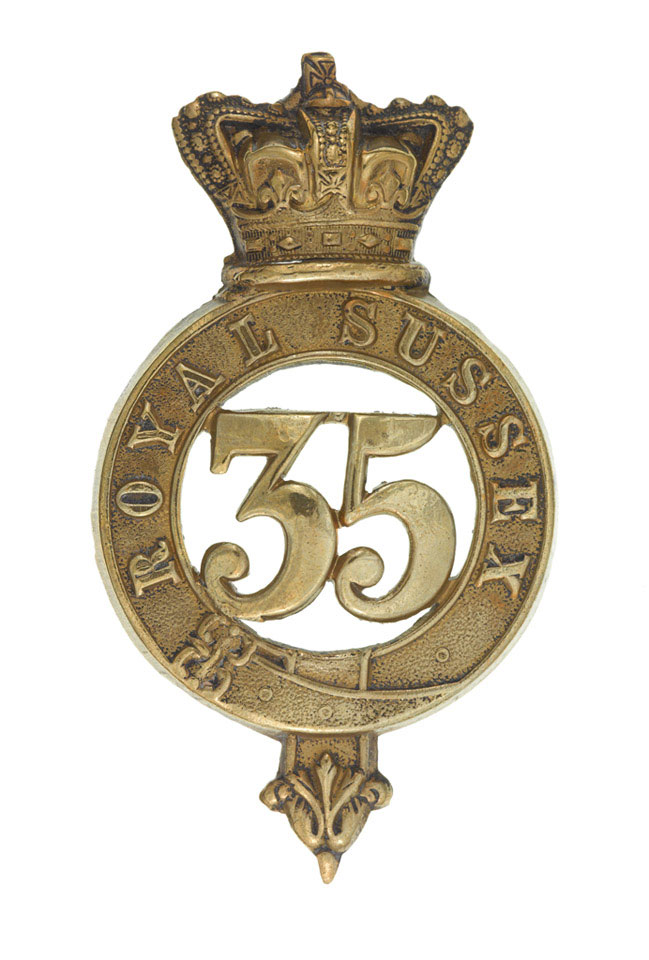
- 1874–1881 regimental Glengarry badge for other ranks
- Active: 1701–1881
- Allegiance: England (1701–1707); Great Britain (1707–1801); United Kingdom (1801–1881)
- Branch: English Army; British Army
- Type: Infantry
- Role: Line infantry
- Garrison/HQ: Roussillon Barracks, Chichester
- Nicknames: "The Orange Lillies" "The Prince of Orange's Own Regiment"
- Motto: Honi soit qui mal y pense
- Colours: Orange Facings
- Anniversaries: Quebec Day
- Engagements: French and Indian War; American War of Independence; Napoleonic Wars; Indian Rebellion

Commanders
- Notable commanders: Arthur Chichester, 3rd Earl of Donegall; Charles Lennox, 4th Duke of Richmond

The 35th (Royal Sussex) Regiment of Foot was a line infantry regiment of the British Army raised in 1701. Under the 1881 Childers Reforms, it was amalgamated with the 107th (Bengal Infantry) Regiment of Foot to form the Royal Sussex Regiment.

== History ==
=== Formation ===
The regiment was raised in Belfast by Arthur Chichester, 3rd Earl of Donegall as the Earl of Donegall's Regiment of Foot or the Belfast Regiment on 28 June 1701 to fight in the War of the Spanish Succession. This was the second raising of the Earl of Donegall's Regiment: the previous regiment was raised in 1693 and disbanded on 8 February 1697: despite the names there was no lineal connection between them. The regiment was a strongly Protestant unit tasked with resisting the spread of Roman Catholicism in Britain. King William III, gave special permission for the regiment to bear orange facings to show their religious allegiance and as a mark of royal favour.

=== Early service ===
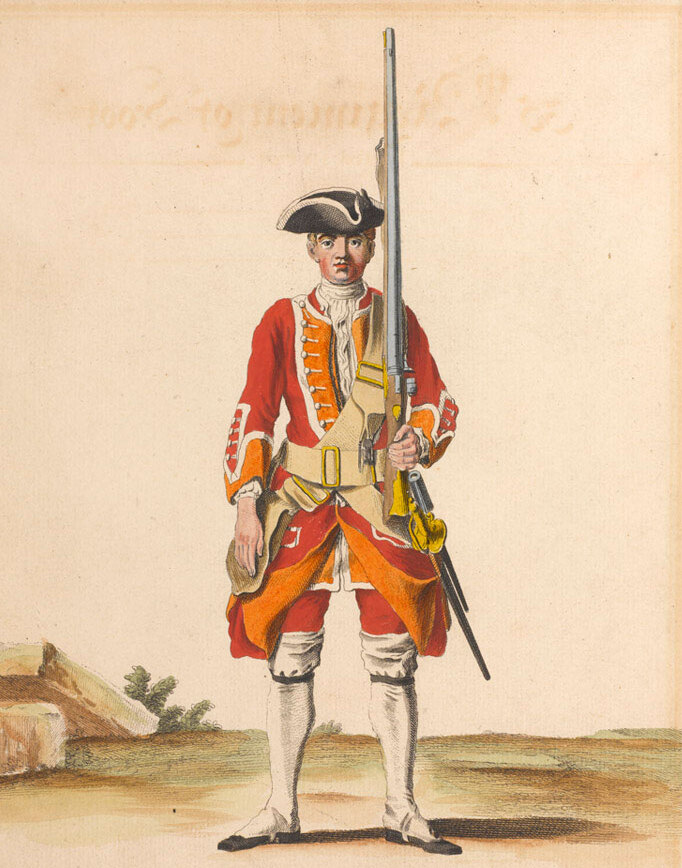
c. 1742 engraving of a regimental private

c. 1751 painting of a regimental grenadier (centre)

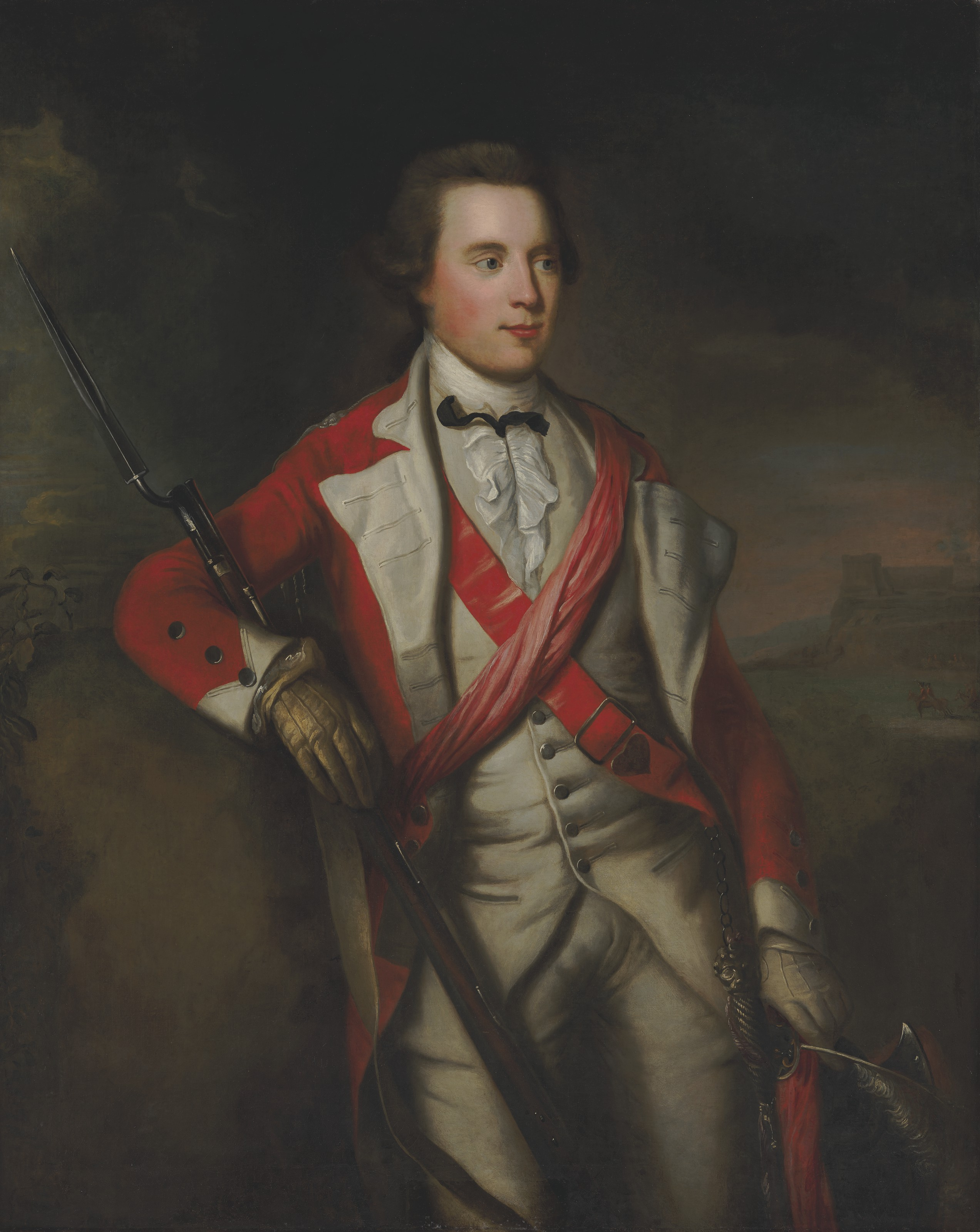
c. 1770 portrait of a regimental lieutenant colonel

Queen Anne issued a Royal Warrant on 1 June 1702 under which Donegall's Regiment was one of six regiments designated for "sea service" and put under the command of the Royal Navy. The troops embarked on several ships in June 1702, and took part in the Battle of Cádiz in August 1702 and the defence of Gibraltar in spring 1705 as well as the siege of Barcelona, where the Earl of Donegall was killed on 16 April 1706. On his death Brigadier Richard Gorges was appointed colonel, with the unit becoming Gorges's Regiment of Foot.

At the disastrous Battle of Almansa in April 1707 the regiment was practically wiped out and the regimental colours were lost. The survivors returned to Ireland where the regiment was reconstituted. In 1717 Gorges resigned as colonel and was replaced by General Charles Otway. In 1751 a royal warrant declared that regiments should no longer be known by the name of their colonel, but their number in the order of precedence, and Otway's duly became the 35th Regiment of Foot.

=== Seven Years' War ===
In April 1756 the regiment embarked from Ireland to British North America for service in the Seven Years' War. The commanding officer of the regiment, Lieutenant-Colonel George Monro, led the defence of the Fort William Henry in August 1757 but was forced to surrender to the superior forces of General the Marquis de Montcalm. The British troops were allowed to leave the fort with their weapons but when the Native American allies of the French attacked the retreating column Montcalm did not intervene. The regiment subsequently took part in the siege of Louisbourg in July 1758 when several of the regiment's officers were wounded.

In September 1759 the regiment had its revenge on Montcalm when it fought under General James Wolfe at the Battle of the Plains of Abraham. Regimental tradition later related that the 35th routed the French Royal Roussillon Regiment, which had been present at Fort William Henry, and took white feathers from their hats as trophies. The emblem of the 'Roussillon Plume' was later incorporated into the Royal Sussex Regiment badge. It saw action again at the Battle of Sainte-Foy where 12 of its men were killed and the subsequent siege of Quebec in April to May 1760. It then took part in the final and decisive campaign between July and September 1760 when Montreal fell. The regiment proceeded to take part in the Invasion of Martinique in January 1762, and departed with the British expedition against Cuba and was part of the besieging force which took Fort Morro in July 1762 and Havana in August 1762. The following year it proceeded to Florida, which had been ceded by Spain to Britain, before returning to England in 1765.

=== American Revolutionary War ===
The regiment returned to America arriving at Boston in April 1775 for service in the American Revolutionary War. It suffered tremendous casualties at the Battle of Bunker Hill in June 1775: of the Light Infantry, all officers and non-commissioned officers were killed or wounded and of the Grenadier Company only five soldiers were alive and unscathed. The regiment suffered the hardships of the siege of Boston in spring 1776 before sailing to New York and taking part in the Battle of Long Island in July 1776 and the Battle of Harlem Heights in September 1776. The commanding officer of the regiment, Lieutenant Colonel Robert Carr, was killed at the Battle of White Plains in October 1776 and, under fresh command, the regiment fought again at the Battle of Fort Washington in November 1776. It saw action in the Philadelphia campaign during much of 1777 and then sailed for the West Indies in July 1778. It took part in the Capture of St. Lucia in December 1778 and then returned to England in September 1785.

=== Change of titles ===
In 1782, George III added county titles to infantry regiments in order to help recruiting and the regiment became the 35th (Dorsetshire) Regiment of Foot. The first real connection with Sussex came in 1787 when Charles Lennox, 4th Duke of Richmond, joined the Regiment. Lennox not only recruited Sussex men for the Regiment from his family estates in the County but, in 1805, obtained Royal permission for the title "Sussex" to be transferred from the 25th Regiment of Foot to the 35th Regiment of Foot.

=== Napoleonic Wars ===
In March 1794 the regiment were part of a British force under Admiral Sir John Jervis and Lieutenant General Sir Charles Grey which captured Fort-de-France, Fort Saint Louis and Fort Bourbon on Martinique. The force went on to capture Saint Lucia in April 1794 and tried unsuccessfully to take Guadeloupe in June 1794 before returning to England in July 1795. The regiment took part in the Anglo-Russian invasion of Holland under the Duke of York and saw action at the Battle of Bergen in September 1799, the Battle of Alkmaar in October 1799 and the Battle of Castricum later that month. It went on to recover Malta from the French in September 1800.

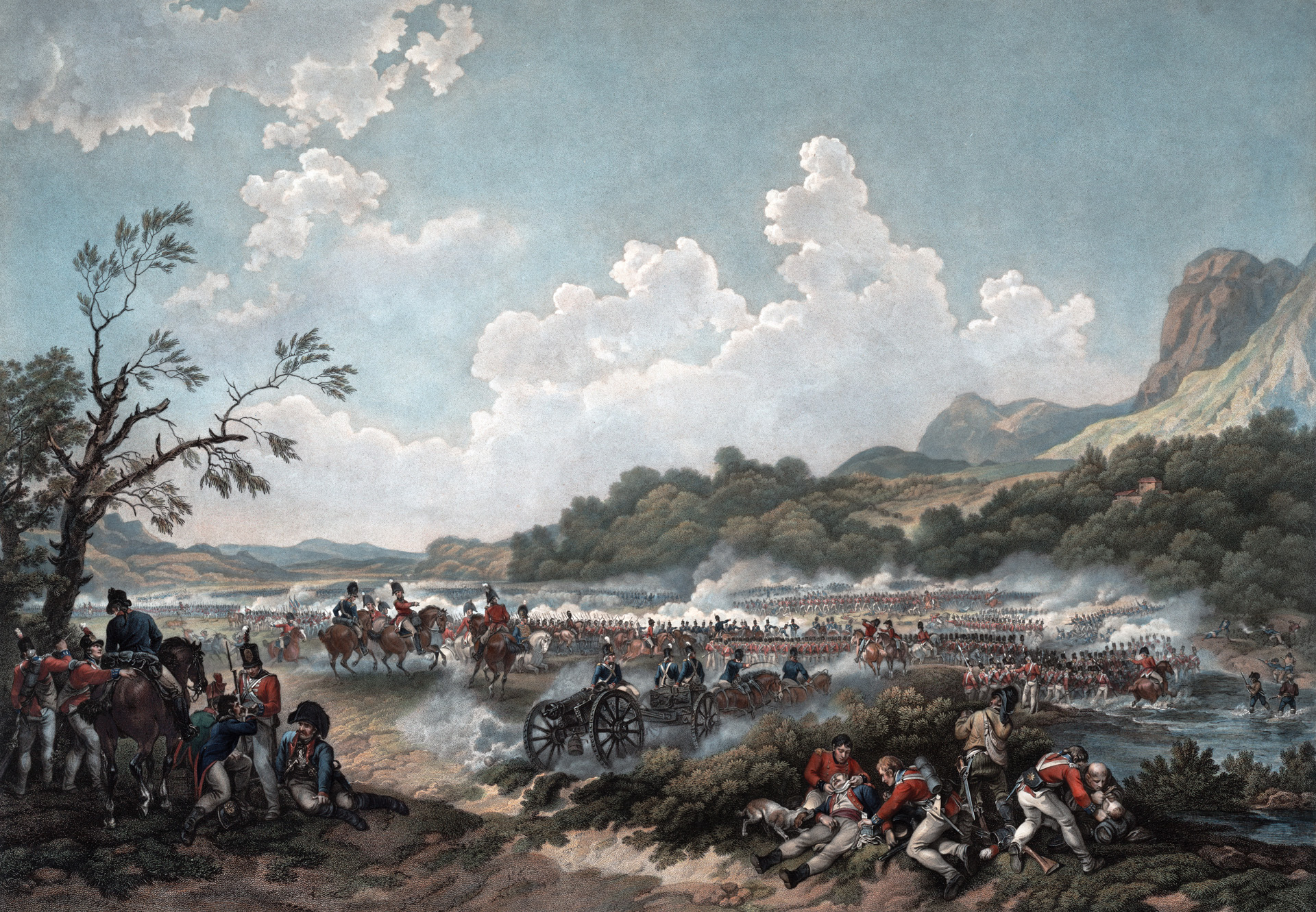
The Battle of Maida, which the regiment fought in

A 2nd battalion was formed in 1804. The 1st battalion was part of an expeditionary force which landed in Italy in February 1806 and saw action at the Battle of Maida in July 1806 during the Napoleonic Wars. The regiment were prominent in the battle and, when General Louis Compère rode into the British line, they captured him in the brief melee that followed.

However, it then suffered significant losses defending Alexandria in summer 1807 during the Alexandria expedition in 1807 and had to be withdrawn to Sicily in September 1807. The 2nd battalion took part in the disastrous Walcheren Campaign in 1809; Lieutenant Colonel Peter Petit, commanding officer of the 2nd battalion, died of the wounds he suffered during the siege of Flushing. Meanwhile, the 1st battalion captured Zakynthos and Cephalonia in October 1809 and Lefkada in March 1810. From October 1813 onwards, the 1st Battalion were landed near Trieste, and in concert with the Austrian forces of Field Marshall Nugent pursued the French, the campaign culminating in the capture of Genoa in April 1814. In December 1813 the 2nd battalion was deployed to the Netherlands and it saw action at the Battle of Waterloo in June 1815.

=== The Victorian era ===
On 15 June 1832 it was announced in the London Gazette that the regiment would be permitted to bear the appellation of Royal, and be in future styled the 35th or Royal Sussex Regiment and that the facings be accordingly changed from orange to blue. In August 1854 the regiment embarked for India and was engaged in skirmishes with rebels near Arrah in February 1858 during the Indian Rebellion. It returned to England in January 1868.

As part of the Cardwell Reforms of the 1870s, where single-battalion regiments were linked together to share a single depot and recruiting district in the United Kingdom, the 35th was linked with the 107th (Bengal Infantry) Regiment of Foot, and assigned to district no. 43 at Roussillon Barracks in Chichester. On 1 July 1881 the Childers Reforms came into effect and the regiment amalgamated with the 107th (Bengal Infantry) Regiment of Foot to form the Royal Sussex Regiment.

== Battle honours ==
Battle honours won by the regiment were:

- Napoleonic Wars: Maida
- Gibraltar 1704–05, Louisburg, Quebec 1759 (all three awarded to successor regiment, 1882)
- Martinique 1762, Havannah, St. Lucia 1778 (all three awarded to successor regiment, 1909)

== Regimental colonels ==
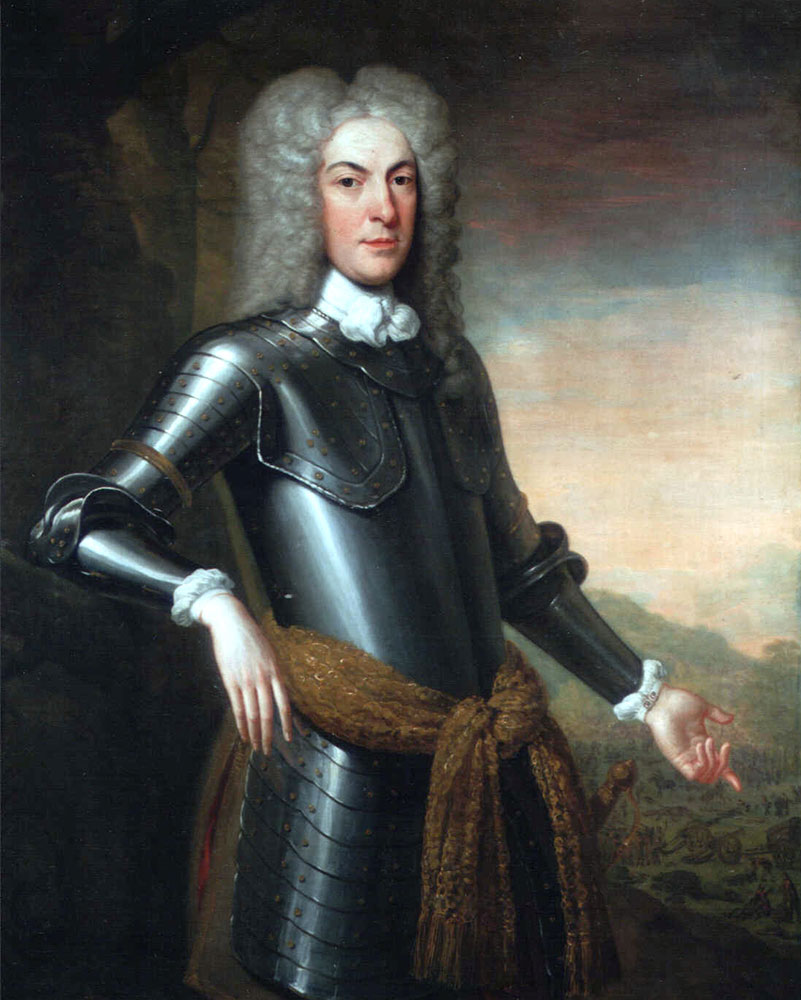
Charles James Otway, the regimental colonel from 1717 to 1764

Colonels of the Regiment were:

Earl of Donegall's Regiment of Foot

- 1701–1706: Maj-Gen. Arthur Chichester, 3rd Earl of Donegall
- 1706–1717: Lt-Gen. Richard Gorges
- 1717–1764: Gen. Charles James Otway

35th Regiment of Foot (The Prince of Orange's Own Regiment) - (1751)

- 1764–1803: Gen. Henry Fletcher
- 1803–1819: Gen. Charles Lennox, 4th Duke of Richmond, KG

35th (Sussex) Regiment - (1805)

- 1819–1840: Gen. Sir John Oswald, GCB, GCMG

35th (Royal Sussex) Regiment of Foot - (1832)

- 1840–1845: Lt-Gen. Sir Richard Downes Jackson, KCB
- 1845–1857: Gen. Sir George Henry Frederick Berkeley, KCB
- 1857–1861: Lt-Gen. John Leslie, KH
- 1861–1863: Gen. Sir George Leigh Goldie, KCB
- 1863–1875: Gen. Arthur Simcoe Baynes
- 1875–1879: Gen. Henry Renny, CSI
- 1879–1881: Gen. Sir Richard Thomas Farren, GCB

== Uniform ==
At its formation in 1701 the regiment was given orange facings on its red coats. This unusual military colour was decided on because of the Earl of Donegall's earlier connections with King William's House of Orange. The orange distinctions were retained until 1832 when facings of royal blue were adopted. Silver epaulettes and braiding were worn by the officers until gold was adopted in 1830. The basic design of the uniform followed the standard pattern of that worn by British line infantry throughout this period.

== Sources ==
- Beatson, Robert (1806). A Political Index to the Histories of Great Britain & Ireland; Or, a Complete Register of the Hereditary Honours, Public Offices, and Persons in Office: From the Earliest Periods to the Present Time: in Three Volumes. Vol II. London: Longman, Hurst Rees and Orme.
- Nafziger, George F.; Gioannini, Marco (2002). The defense of the Napoleonic kingdom of Northern Italy, 1813-1814. Westport, Conn.: Praeger. ISBN 978-0-313-07531-5.
- Schneid, Frederick C. (2002). Napoleon's Italian Campaigns: 1805-1815. Westport, Connecticut: Praeger Publishers. ISBN 0-275-96875-8.
- Swinson, Arthur (1972). A Register of the Regiments and Corps of the British Army. London: The Archive Press. ISBN 0-85591-000-3.
- Trimen, Richard (1873). An Historical Memoir of the 35th Royal Sussex Regiment of Foot. Southampton: The Southampton Times Newspaper and Printing and Publishing Co.
