= Bomanjee =

Bomanjee is a given name. Notable people with the name include:

- Bomanjee Dinshaw Petit (1859–1915), Indian cotton mill owner
- Jamsetjee Bomanjee Wadia (c. 1754–1821), Indian shipbuilder
- Jeejeebhoy Piroshaw Bomanjee Jeejeebhoy (1891–1950), Indian military pilot
