= Henri van Laun =

Writer and teacher of French (1820–1896)

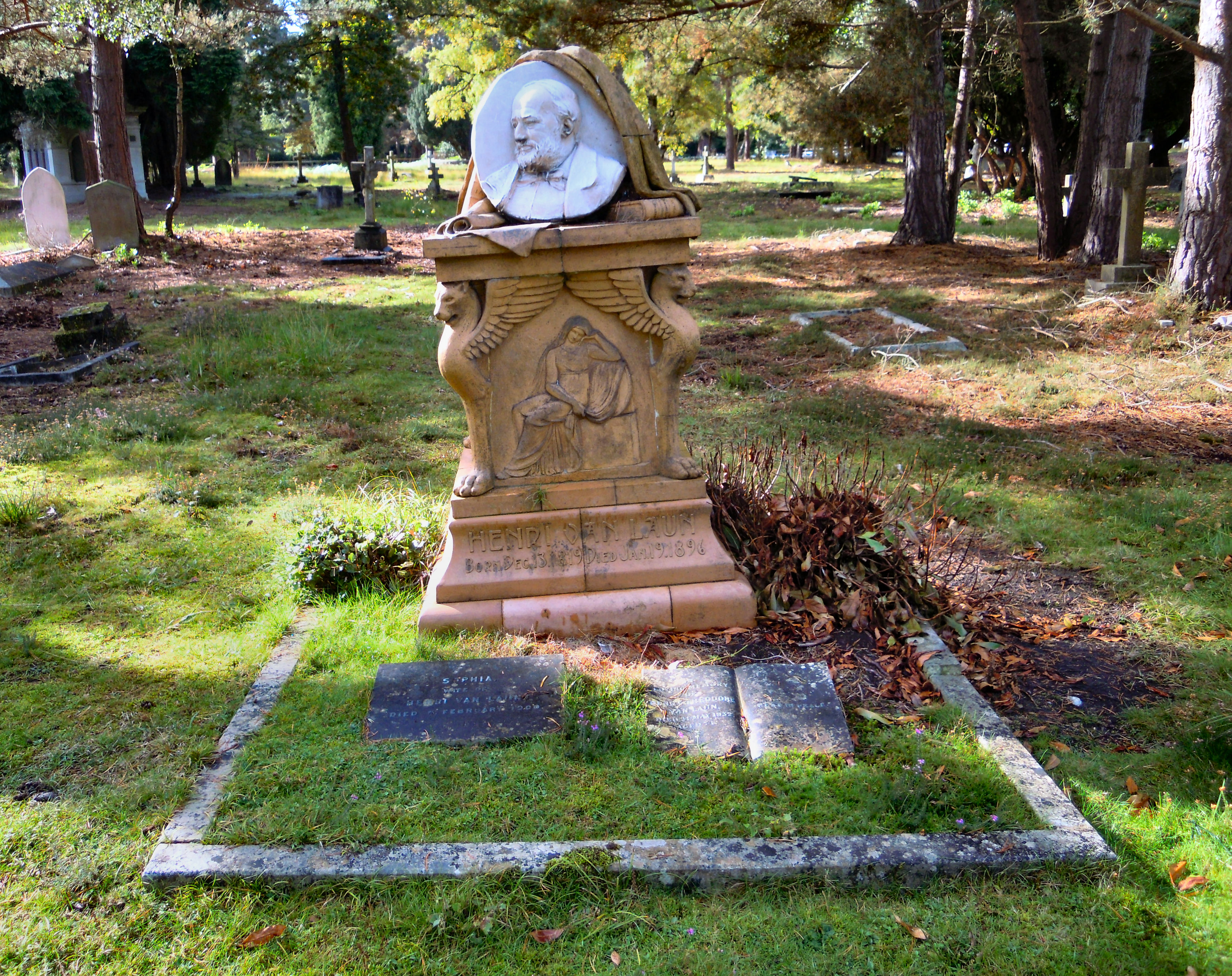
Tomb of Henri van Laun in Brookwood Cemetery

Henri van Laun (1820 – 19 January 1896) was a writer, translator and teacher of French. Born in the Netherlands and educated in France, he lived most of his life in England. He originally thought of being a journalist but found he preferred teaching. He was a friend of Hippolyte Taine and translated his History of English Literature into English. Van Laun also translated works by Molière, Alain-René Lesage and Jean de La Bruyère.

Van Laun is buried in Brookwood Cemetery and his tomb is a grade II listed building designed by the sculptor Emmeline Halse.
