= Stanley Spooner =

British editor and journalist

- Born: 20 November 1856; Rosherville, Northfleet, Kent, England
- Died: April 3, 1940 (aged 83); University College Hospital, London, England
- Education: King's College London
- Occupations: Journalist, magazine editor, publisher, stockbroker, accountant
- Known for: Founding Flight magazine and The Automotor Journal
- Parent(s): Frederick William Spooner (father); Sarah Ann Janes (mother)

Stanley Spooner (20 November 1856 – 3 April 1940) was an English editor and journalist who played a pioneering role in early British transport media. In 1896 he founded and edited The Automotor And Horseless Vehicle Journal, which shortened its title to The Automotor Journal, in April 1902. Recognizing the rapid dawn of aviation, Spooner established Flight, (now Flight International) in January 1909, creating the world's first weekly magazine dedicated to aeronautics. After the success of Flight, his Automotor Journal was renamed The Auto. Spooner’s lifelong contributions to the automotive and aviation industries were formally recognized decades later when he was made a liveryman of the Worshipful Company of Coachmakers and Coach Harness Makers, on 15 January 1929. This automatically granted him the title of Freeman of the City of London. (Note: Aviation pioneer Frederick Handley Page, Hugo Massac Buist, editor of The Autocar and Frederic Stanley Bennett (then the manager of the Nash Motor Company and vice-president of the Society of Motor Manufacturers and Traders) were also made Freemen of the City and liverymen of the company on the same day.)

== Family and early life ==
Spooner was born at Campbell Lodge, in Rosherville, Northfleet, Kent, on 20 November 1856, and his birth was registered on 1 January 1857. He was the youngest son of Frederick William Spooner, an accountant, and his wife Sarah Ann (formerly Janes). Spooner had four sisters, three brothers, and one half-brother. His older half-brother, Frederick William, was born in Hoxton.

His father was a Freemason, who in 1854 was elected as the Worshipful Master of Enoch Lodge (No.11). Spooner would later join the fraternity himself. Frederick was an auditor and accountant of various different companies. Spooner initially followed in his father's footsteps, working as an accountant before establishing himself as a stockbroker.

Frederick William Spooner had moved his family to Gravesend by October 1863. Catherine Sarah Spooner, his oldest daughter, was married to Thomas Toller Hurst Daniell. Spooner would later work with Thomas.

Spooner was educated at King's College School, London, beginning his attendance as a pupil in September 1870. He was enrolled at the Lower School, and remained a student into the following year, achieving academic success by winning the Upper Second Class prize for the Michaelmas term in 1871, and the Landscape Drawing prize during the Lent term of 1872. His education was supplemented with further studies in France and Germany.

He had returned to Kent by late 1873; on 2 and 3 October Spooner served as a Steward at a Bazaar held at the Assembly Rooms in Gravesend on behalf of St. James's Schools. It was opened by Lady Darnley the wife of John Bligh, 6th Earl of Darnley. His father died shortly after this on 28 November 1873 in Gravesend.

== Career ==
=== Early career ===
At the beginning of his career Spooner worked for a short period as a cashier at the Co-operative Credit Bank, Queen Victoria Street, London. Before 13 January 1876, he was working as a clerk for Hudswell & Co., the firm serving as accountants for the bank. On this date he was sent to the offices of stockbroker Richard Pfungst, to correct a contract note regarding a sale of Union Bank shares for a client. The bank collapsed, and on 5 February 1876, Spooner was called as a formal witness at the Mansion House, London during the high-profile fraud trial of the bank's manager, Richard Banner Oakley. Oakley was subsequently convicted of obtaining money and securities under false pretences.

He became a Freemason and was initiated into the Chiltern Lodge (No. 1470) on 21 December 1880, at which time his occupation was recorded as an accountant. By the 1881 Census, Spooner was working as a newspaper advertising manager based at Little Piazza, Tavistock Chambers. When the Constitutional Club was formed in 1883, he was one of its original members. In 1889, he joined the Anglo-American Lodge (No. 2191). By January 1890, he was actively associated with individuals in the publishing sector, serving on a committee that presented a testimonial to Thomas Ward, the founder and managing director of the London Music Publishing Company.

Spooner was admitted as a member of the London Stock Exchange on 24 March 1890. Initially working as a clerk, he became a stockbroker and junior partner of Hurst, Daniell, Spooner & Co. in April 1891, a firm run by his brother-in-law, Thomas Toller Hurst Daniell. On 15 May 1891, it was reported in the London Evening Standard that they were declared defaulters upon the stock exchange. This was caused after George James, a stockbroker from Southport for whom the firm acted as agents, absconded after failing to pay losses made on his account. James had misappropriated £70,000 and was subsequently sentenced to five years' imprisonment at Liverpool assizes on 28 July 1891.

Despite this financial setback, Spooner maintained his standing within London's prominent social and entertainment networks. On 15 August 1893, he was among those present at the Tivoli Theatre for a ceremony presenting a framed portrait, painted by Joseph Mordecai, to the notable music hall manager Charles Morton on the occasion of Morton's 74th birthday. Following the death of the previous Worshipful Master, Joseph Potter, Spooner was installed into the chair as Worshipful Master of the Cricklewood Lodge on 18 October 1893.

=== The Automotor and Horseless Vehicle Journal ===
By mid-1896, Spooner was associated with the publishing and advertising firm F. King & Co. He represented the company publicly on 14 July 1896 at the Music Hall Sports event, where he personally distributed a prize on behalf of the firm. A few months later, on 15 October 1896, a monthly journal created by Spooner, titled The Automotor and Horseless Vehicle Journal, went on sale for sixpence. It was published by the company at its offices in St. Martin's Lane, Charing Cross, (Note: The offices had moved to 44, St. Martin's Lane before 1903.) and Spooner had become the company's managing director by May 1897.

The inaugural issue included a portrait and biography of Sir David Salomons, alongside coverage of the 1896 Paris–Marseille–Paris Automobile race. From its second issue, the journal carried the subtitle "A Record and Review of Applied Automatic Locomotion". This went on sale three days after the commencement of the Locomotives on Highways Act 1896, which Spooner viewed as ridding the British motor car industry of absurd regulations. It included an article celebrating the legal liberation of the road as "Emancipation Day" and reported on the inaugural London-to-Brighton run that marked the occasion.

In February 1897 Spooner denounced promoter Henry John Lawson's British Motor Syndicate enterprise as an overcapitalised "fiasco" built on a policy of "bluff". He refuted the syndicate's claims of holding all "master patents" for motor carriages in the country, revealing that they did not possess any. Spooner viewed their aggressive patent litigation against Charles Rolls as a hollow marketing stunt designed to fleece the public, and warned that the reputation of the genuine engineering industry was threatened by deceptive corporate manoeuvres like this.

Over the years, the publication featured technical drawings, diagrams, book reviews, and reports on early automated transport. It also provided comprehensive updates on automobile legislation and motor club activities.

A regular Correspondence section was established to print letters from the public, which Spooner answered in subsequent editions. He later adapted this interactive format for his subsequent publication, Flight magazine.

The title of the journal was shortened to The Automotor Journal in April 1902. It was sold weekly from 19 April 1902, and the price was reduced to twopence.Around this time, the publication also introduced a dedicated Aeronautics subsection to document early achievements in flight.

The journal consistently covered aviation milestones alongside automotive news until the launch of Flight magazine. In May 1903, it featured Alberto Santos-Dumont and his airship No. 9, followed that September by a report on the Wright brothers' experiments. Coverage expanded as aviation progressed; an October 1906 entry detailed Santos-Dumont's historic flight at Bagatelle in the 14-bis biplane, and a January 1908 issue recorded Henri Farman winning the Deutsch-Archdeacon prize at Issy, France. By April 1908, the journal published official technical diagrams of the Wright brothers' patented aeroplane design. Spooner remained as editor of The Automotor Journal until 1931.

=== Views on early automotive propulsion ===
As an automotive editor and journalist, Spooner often evaluated different propulsion methods during the transition from horse-drawn transport. In the April 1899 issue of The Automotor and Horseless Vehicle Journal, Spooner supported using compressed air for heavy city transit, and praised the widespread use of the technology in the United States, adding that "there is a big future for compressed air, and we only wonder why so little has hitherto been attempted to utilise this form of energy for moto-vehicles." As the technical challenges of utilizing compressed air for personal motor cars became apparent, Spooner's outlook shifted. In the 15 March 1900 issue, he printed an article titled "Electric Automobiles", which featured a paper by American inventor Elmer A. Sperry comparing compressed air to the electric battery. His data showed that the pistons used in air engines were "a long step backward" compared to smooth, spinning electric motors. And an electric battery could produce over four times as much power as an equally heavy compressed air tank without needing complex, heavy valves. Spooner's scepticism was finalized in November 1900 following his review of the automotive exhibits at the Paris Universal Exposition in Vincennes, observing that the compressed-air cars on display exhibited "nothing of any commercial importance or of novelty", and noting that during an earlier visit to the exposition, one pneumatic vehicle had an "uncommonly noisy air compressor." This led him to conclude that such poor presentations failed to impress potential buyers.

Analysing the early market for private electric cars in his 1904 contribution to Sir Alfred Harmsworth's Motors and Motor-Driving, he explained that early industry attempts to utilise them for long-distance touring and racing had largely ended. He pointed out that while early manufacturers hoped widespread charging infrastructure would allow electric cars to compete with petrol alternatives, practical experience had instead limited their use to short range urban trips. He identified it as a disadvantage, in comparison with other self-propelled vehicles, that the lead-acid batteries needed frequent recharging, were heavy, and often needed to be replaced due to their fragile nature. Furthermore, he noted that these vehicles sometimes required a level of care and occasionally highly skilled attention beyond what an average owner was typically willing or able to provide. Because of this, Spooner concluded that the electric vehicle was a luxury restricted either to rural owners with private electric-lighting plants, or to urban residents with access to specialized city charging depots. Within this urban sphere, however, he praised them as an ideal "town carriage" due to their "fool-proof" operation, lack of vibration, and near-silent, odourless mechanics. While acknowledging that their £500 annual fixed tariff was considered high by early motorists, he indicated that this cost was equivalent to maintaining a two-horse carriage in London. Spooner predicted steady, incremental improvements to battery technology.

In a May 1906, publication of The Bystander, he evaluated electric, steam, and petrol power sources using the heavy motor-omnibus sector as a benchmark to test each system's durability, and concluded that petrol and advanced steam were vastly superior to electric options. Spooner dismissed electric propulsion generally, and noted that there had been no far-reaching improvements in rechargeable batteries for a decade. This left battery life too short and operating costs unsustainably high compared to petrol. Conversely, he praised the development of the "flash" type boiler systems engineered by the White Steam Car Company and British engineer Thomas Clarkson, finding that steam compared highly favourably with petrol variants in operating efficiency. While acknowledging that contemporary petrol engines produced odour, and were noisy, he anticipated that these engineering defects were short-term and would soon be overcome through advanced lubrication systems and superior construction.

When the London Electrobus Company launched its prospectus and appealed for share applicants, Spooner initiated a public campaign opposing the venture due to the high costs of battery recharging and maintenance in comparison to running costs for petrol buses. He argued that these costs had been underestimated in the prospectus, viewed the operation of electrically-propelled buses as a commercial impossibility, and predicted the company's failure. Enabled by his background as an accountant, Spooner publicly dismantled a financial challenge from Edward Cunliffe-Owen (Secretary of the Metropolitan Electric Supply Company) by utilising audited data from The Electromobile Company, London's largest electric vehicle operator, to prove the financial unviability of the proposed electrobus battery running costs. He noted that the London Electric Cabs, and electric trams in Birmingham had previously failed as businesses, and to his knowledge, in the subsequent years there had been no radical developments in batteries which would warrant the electrobus being a success. In March 1908 he praised the efficiency of their battery-swapping system, and admitted the service was popular with the public. But Spooner remained sceptical of the venture as a business model, arguing that data from a six or seven-bus trial could not be upscaled in a reliable way to a large commercial fleet, and warned that it was far too speculative for ordinary public investors.

=== Automobile Club and early aviation ties ===
Spooner was a founding member of the Automobile Club of Great Britain and Ireland (later the Royal Automobile Club), having joined the organisation immediately upon its formation. and served on its committee from 1900. Through this committee, he befriended early motoring and aviation pioneers Charles Rolls, and John Moore-Brabazon. When Rolls co-founded the Aero Club of Great Britain (later the Royal Aero Club) in 1901, Spooner joined as a foundational committee member, establishing close ties between the two organizations. He also established a friendship with balloonist and pioneer aviator Griffith Brewer. On 8 October 1908 Brewer became the first Englishman to go up in an aeroplane. This occurred when he was a passenger to Wilbur Wright at Camp d'Auvours near Le Mans, France. Through Brewer, Spooner maintained a direct line of communication with the Wright brothers. Brewer was a close friend of the Wrights, and also their British patent agent.

=== Flight ===
Spooner concluded that by 1908, the aviation sector had progressed enough to warrant a dedicated standalone publication. When he consulted Claude Goodman Johnson, the managing director of Rolls-Royce, Johnson strongly objected to the idea, arguing against the commercial viability of launching a journal exclusively devoted to flying. Scepticism also came from other critics. Nevertheless, Spooner was undeterred and personally funded the magazine's inception, which during its first few years endured a challenging financial period. To establish legal copyright ahead of its launch as an independent weekly publication, the aeronautical sections of The Automotor Journal were bound inside Flight covers for eight weeks starting in November 1908. On 2 January 1909 the first issue of Flight went on sale. It was the official journal of the Aero Club of the United Kingdom. Spooner was on that club's committee in 1909. The inaugural front cover featured a photograph of John Moore-Brabazon piloting his aeroplane during his flights at Issy-les-Moulineaux, France, on 3 December 1908. Beneath the main title, the cover carried the sub-heading "A Second Englishman Flies". The magazine credited Henri Farman as being the first Englishman to fly a heavier-than-air machine. Henri was born in France to English parents. He became a French citizen in 1937.

The first letter printed in Flight's Correspondence section was from aeronautical pioneer Frederick W. Lanchester, who objected to Spooner's editorial support for the word "aerodrome" being used to describe "a big open space for flying machines." Early publications documented the formation of flying clubs in the United Kingdom, and some of their activities, such as kiting, ballooning, and model aircraft flying, alongside technical developments in aviation.

In March 1916, Spooner clashed with independent MP Noel Pemberton Billing after he publicly accused the government of "murdering" British officers by deploying substandard aircraft. Spooner fiercely counter-attacked in print, repeatedly accusing Billing of adopting "yellow journalism", and describing his indictment as "the irresponsible ravings of third-rate sensational journalism rather than the measured views of a man in earnest for the welfare of his country". He claimed Billing had lost the sympathy of many men who were otherwise prepared to listen to his claims, and support the urgent calls of aviation.

By 1917 the Flight offices had moved from St. Martin's Lane, to 36, Great Queen Street, opposite Freemasons' Hall, London.

During his time as editor, the magazine recorded the aerial accomplishments, among others of Charles Rolls, Louis Bleriot, Roland Garros, and Charles Lindbergh.

He retired as editor of Flight in April 1934, and sold the magazine to Iliffe & Sons. Spooner had already sold his magazine The Auto before this date. On 18 December 1934 at 36, Great Queen Street, an Extraordinary General Meeting was held. At this meeting a special resolution was passed that the publisher F. King & Co. Ltd was to be wound up voluntarily and Spooner was appointed official liquidator for this purpose.

== Marriage ==
Spooner married Bessey Maddox on 12 September 1907 at the Register Office, St. George Hanover Square, London. Bessey was a widow, and a daughter of John Craggs, a deceased leather merchant. (Note: This address had been the premises of the Automobile Club of Great Britain and Ireland from May 1902 until it became the Royal Automobile Club in March 1907 following a royal decree by King Edward VII.) Bessey died in 1926, and was buried at Brookwood Cemetery on 16 September 1926.

== Death ==
Spooner died of thrombosis at University College Hospital, London, on 3 April 1940. He was buried on 6 April 1940 at Brookwood Cemetery. Probate was granted on 10 June 1940, with the value of his effects coming to £116,064, 6 shillings and 9 pence. Having actively supported the scientific development of flight since joining the Aeronautical Society of Great Britain (later the Royal Aeronautical Society) during its turn-of-the-century revival era, he maintained a lifelong dedication to the organization. To ensure the continuation of this work, £5,000 of his estate was bequeathed to the society to establish the Stanley Spooner Scholarship for aeronautical research.
