= Flight International =

British aviation magazine

- Flight International cover, July 2026
- Editor: Craig Hoyle
- Categories: Aerospace
- Frequency: Weekly to September 2020, thereafter monthly, from January 2025 quarterly. Printed edition ceased completely at the end of 2025.
- Total circulation: 26,000 (December 2019)
- Founder: Stanley Spooner
- Founded: 1909; 117 years ago
- First issue: 2 January 1909; 117 years ago
- Company: ProMedia Group UK
- Country: England
- Based in: Sutton, London
- Language: British English
- Website: www.flightglobal.com
- ISSN: 0015-3710

Flight International, formerly Flight, is a quarterly magazine focused on aerospace. Published in the United Kingdom and founded in 1909 as "A Journal devoted to the Interests, Practice, and Progress of Aerial Locomotion and Transport"; as of November 2025 it was the world's oldest continuously published printed aviation news magazine.

Flight International is published by ProMedia. Competitors include Jane's Information Group and Aviation Week & Space Technology. Former editors of, and contributors include H. F. King, Bill Gunston, John W. R. Taylor and David Learmount.

== History ==
The founder and first editor of Flight was Stanley Spooner. He was also the creator and editor of The Automotor Journal, originally titled The Automotor Journal and Horseless Vehicle. From around 1900, the journal had a separate section relating to aviation and aeronautical matters. The 5 April 1908 issue of The Automotor Journal included a diagram of patent drawings of an aeroplane made by the Wright brothers. Stanley kept in contact with them via his friend Griffith Brewer. Eventually, Spooner decided that a journal focused solely on matters relating to flying should be published—and so, Flight magazine was established as an offshoot of The Automotor Journal.

Claiming to be the first aeronautical weekly in the world, Flight first appeared on 2 January 1909 as the official journal of the Aero Club of the United Kingdom (later the Royal Aero Club). In April 1934, Flight was acquired by Iliffe & Sons, who were proprietors and printers of technical magazines, one of which included Autocar. On 4 January 1962, the magazine was renamed Flight International. In October 1968, Aeroplane: The International Air Transport Journal—commonly known as Aeroplane—merged with its sister publication, Flight International.

In August 2019, Flight International and its associated divisions (except analytics and consulting divisions, which were retained by RELX as Cirium) were sold to DVV Media Group. In September 2020, Flight International switched from a weekly to monthly publication, in January 2025 to quarterly publication.

At the end of 2025, after 117 years of publication, the printed version of Flight International was discontinued.

On 31 December 2025, FlightGlobal (including Flight International) and related assets were sold to ProMedia Group UK.

== See also ==
- Aviation Week & Space Technology, a similar aerospace sector industry magazine
- FlightGlobal
