= Henry Goldfinch =

Sir Henry Goldfinch KCB
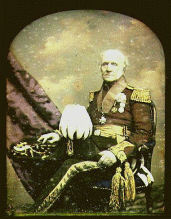
- Goldfinch in about 1853
- Born: 24 November 1781; London
- Died: 21 November 1854 (aged 72); London
- Military career
- Allegiance: United Kingdom
- Branch: British Army
- Service years: 1789–1854
- Rank: Lieutenant-general
- Unit: Royal Engineers
- Conflicts: Napoleonic Wars; Hanover Expedition; Copenhagen Expedition; Peninsular War; Second Battle of Porto (POW); Battle of Talavera; Battle of Bussaco; Battle of Alba de Tormes; Battle of Vitoria; Battle of the Pyrenees; Battle of the Nive; Battle of Orthez; Battle of Toulouse
- Awards: Army Gold Cross; Military General Service Medal

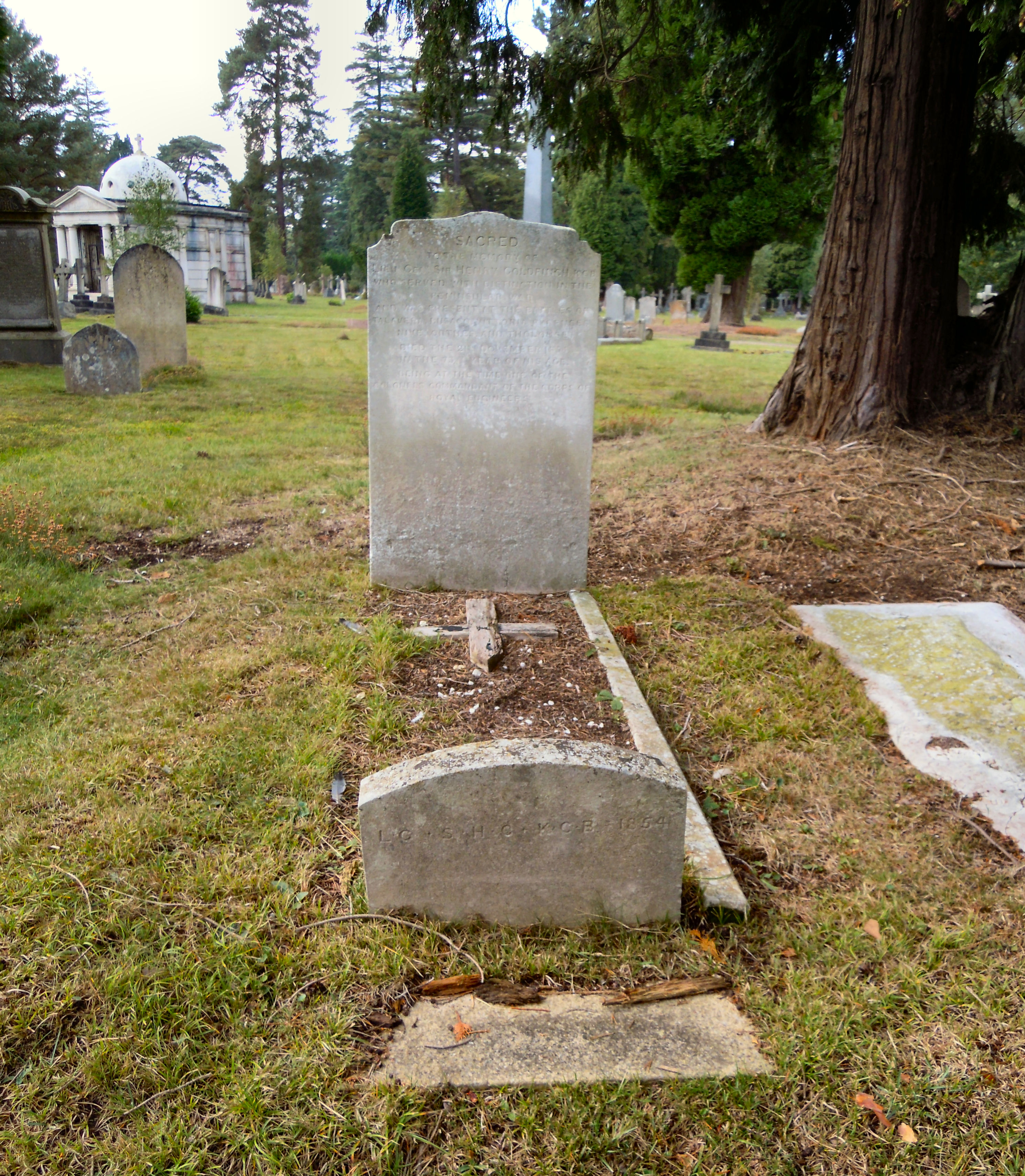
The grave of Sir Henry Goldfinch is one of the earliest in Brookwood Cemetery

Lieutenant-General Sir Henry Goldfinch KCB (24 November 1781 – 21 November 1854) was an officer in the Royal Engineers who served during the Peninsular War of 1807 to 1814, ending his career as one of the colonels commandant of the Corps of Royal Engineers. He was appointed a Companion of the Order of the Bath (CB) in 1815 and a Knight Commander of the Order of the Bath (KCB) in 1852.

Harry Goldfinch was born in London, the son of Henry Goldfinch and his wife, Ann Paterson or Patterson. He was educated at Tonbridge School and the Royal Military Academy, Woolwich.

He joined the army in 1796 as an officer in the Royal Engineers and served at Hanover (1805) and at the Battle of Copenhagen (1807). He served with distinction during the Peninsular War from May 1809 to April 1814 and was present at the battles of Talavera (1809), Bussaco (1810), Vittoria (1813), Pyrenees (1813), Nive (1813), Orthez (1814) and Toulouse (1814). He was captured at the Battle of Porto (1809) but managed to escape.

Goldfinch was promoted to second lieutenant (1798), first lieutenant (1800), second captain (1805), captain (1807), brevet major (1812), brevet lieutenant-colonel (1813), lieutenant-colonel (1814), colonel (1837), major-general (1841), lieutenant-general (1851) and colonel commandant (1854). He received the Gold Cross for Vittoria, Nive, Orthez and Toulouse and the Military General Service Medal with three clasps for Talavera, Busaco, and the Pyrenees.

With his wife, Catherine Elizabeth (née Thomas), he had two sons, Henry Robert Goldfinch and John Howard Goldfinch, as well as two daughters, Mary Louisa Goldfinch and Catherine Elizabeth Goldfinch.

He died at his home at 11 Upper Wimpole Street, London, on 21 November 1854, aged 73, and was buried at Brookwood Cemetery on 25 November 1854, just two weeks after the cemetery opened, being the 29th person to be buried there. His is the oldest surviving memorial anywhere within the cemetery.
