= Fortunatus Dwarris =

English lawyer and author

Sir Fortunatus William Lilley Dwarris (1786–1860) was an English lawyer and author.

== Life ==
The eldest son of William Dwarris of Warwick and Golden Grove, Jamaica, by Sarah, daughter of W. Smith of Southam in Warwickshire, he was born in Jamaica on 23 October 1786. He inherited property there, but left the island in infancy, and entered Rugby School 23 October 1801. He went on to University College, Oxford, and took the degree of B.A. on 1 March 1808. He was called to the bar at the Middle Temple on 28 June 1811.

Through his connection with Jamaica, Dwarris was appointed in 1822 one of the commissioners to inquire into the state of the law in the colonies in the West Indies. An act of parliament was based upon his report (he was the only surviving commissioner), and he was knighted on 2 May 1838. He acted as a member of the commission for examining into the municipal corporations, a master of the Queen's Bench, recorder of Newcastle-under-Lyme, and counsel to the Board of Health. In 1850, he was elected a bencher of the Middle Temple, and in 1859, he was appointed its treasurer.

Dwarris was a Fellow of the Royal Society and Fellow of the Society of Antiquaries of London, a vice-president of the Archæological Association, and a member of the Archæological Institute. He was elected to the American Philosophical Society in 1775. He died at 75 Eccleston Square, London, on 20 May 1860, and was buried in Brookwood Cemetery on 26 May; his wife died in the same house on 10 June 1856, and her remains were placed in the same cemetery on 16 June.

== Works ==
Dwarris published:

- ‘Substance of the Three Reports of the Commissioner of Inquiry into the Administration of Civil and Criminal Justice in the West Indies; extracted from the Parliamentary Papers,’ 1827.
- ‘The West India Question plainly stated, and the only Practical Remedy briefly considered,’ 1828, in which Dwarris argued in favour of an improvement in the condition of the slaves and the gradual abolition of slavery. His views on these questions were also set out in a long letter which he addressed from Barbados in January 1823 to Samuel Parr.
- ‘A General Treatise on Statutes,’ 1830–1, two parts; 2nd ed., assisted by William Henry Amyot, son-in-law to Dwarris, 1848; another edition was by Platt Potter, LL.D., one of the justices of the supreme court of the state of New York, Albany, New York, 1871. It became a standard work.
- ‘Alberic, Consul of Rome,’ historical drama in five acts (anon.), 1832.
- ‘Railway Results, or the Gauge Deliverance;’ a dramatic sketch, 1845. ‘A Skit on the Railway Mania,’ ‘Young England,’ and other works.
- ‘Some New Facts and a Suggested New Theory as to the Authorship of Junius,’ privately printed, 1850. The opinion of Dwarris was that the Letters of Junius were written by several persons, of whom Sir Philip Francis was the leading light.
- ‘A Letter to the Fellows of the Royal Society of Antiquaries on the Present Condition and Future Prospects of the Society,’ privately printed, 1852; an argument in favour of a reduction in the rate of subscription and on the necessity for increased energy in the society's operations.
- ‘A Letter to the Lord Chancellor on his Proposed Scheme for the Consolidation of the Statute Law,’ 1853.
- ‘The Widow's Rescue,’ ‘Select Eulogies,’ ‘Schooled or Fooled,’ a tale, ‘Collected and Recollected,’ 1855.

He wrote also in the Journal of the British Archaeological Association and Archæologia.

== Family ==
On 28 February 1811, Dwarris married Alicia, daughter of Robert Brereton, a captain in the army. Their family consisted of four sons and two daughters.
