= Jeejeebhoy Piroshaw Bomanjee Jeejeebhoy =

First Indian military pilot who served in the Royal Flying Corps during World War I

J. P. B. Jeejeebhoy

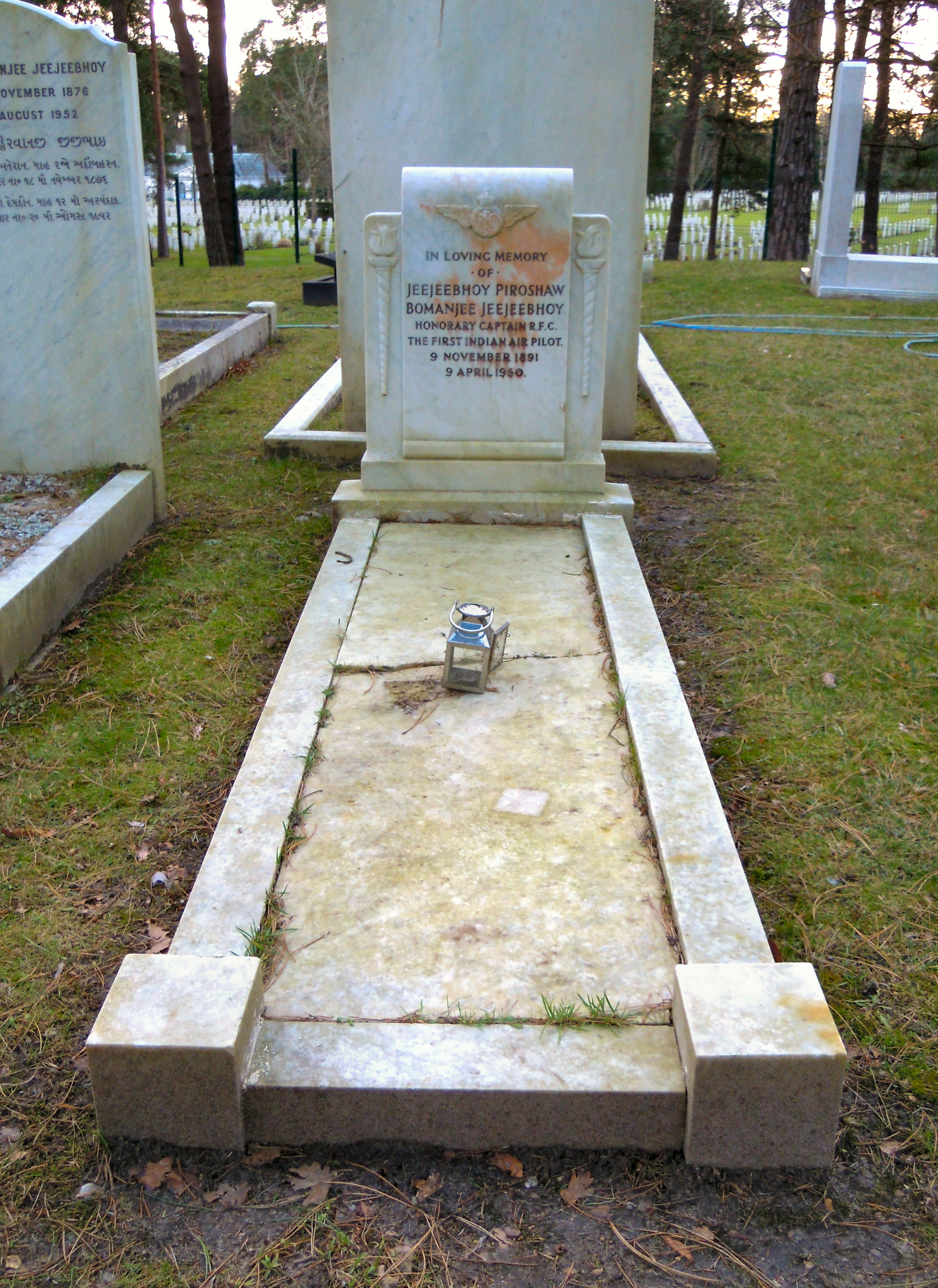
Jeejeebhoy's grave in the Parsi section of Brookwood Cemetery

Jeejeebhoy Piroshaw Bomanjee Jeejeebhoy (9 November 1891 – 9 April 1950) was the first Indian military pilot, briefly serving in the Royal Flying Corps during World War I.

== Early life ==
Jeejeebhoy Piroshaw Bomanjee Jeejeebhoy was born on 9 November 1891 in Mumbai, India, into a minor aristocratic Parsi family. He was elected a Fellow of the Royal Geographical Society in 1912.

== First World War ==
Generally, the Indian Army officers who fought as pilots during World War I were of European rather than Indian descent. Before the war, it was the policy of the War Office to deny commissions to applicants not of pure European descent on the grounds that "a British private will never follow a half-caste or native officer." However, a shortage of pilots resulted in a change in policy, and a handful of Indian military pilots served during that war as officers of the Royal Flying Corps and later the Royal Air Force, rather than as officers of the Indian Army. Jeejeebhoy held an FAI accredited Aviator Certificate while undergoing training with the RFC. He completed his flying training at Stinson School at San Antonio, Texas on 2 May 1916 and held American Aviator certificate #495.

Jeejeebhoy was promoted to temporary honorary 2nd lieutenant in the Royal Flying Corps on the General List on 6 November 1916. He was the first of five Indian military pilots. However, his active career with the RFC was brief, as his papers in The National Archives show that he fell ill in January 1917 while training at the RFC's Oxford School of Instruction, and he was suspended from training to convalesce. In May 1917 a medical board decided that he was permanently unfit for further service, and an entry in The London Gazette of 29 May 1917 announced that "Temp Hon 2nd Lt Jeejeebhoy Piroshaw Bomanjee Jeejeebhoy relinquishes his commission on account of ill health". He was given an honorary commission of 2nd lieutenant at the time of discharge. In 1920 he was given an honorary commission as captain and may have served in the Air Ministry of the British government in the early 1920s.

== Death ==
Jeejeebhoy died on 9 April 1950, aged 58, in Harlow, Essex. He is buried in the Parsi section of Brookwood Cemetery, Surrey.
