= 158th Regiment Royal Armoured Corps =

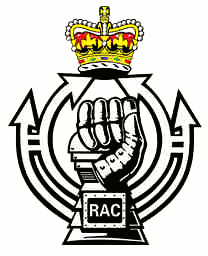
- Badge of the Royal Armoured Corps
- Active: 1942–1943
- Disbanded: 1 April 1943
- Country: United Kingdom
- Branch: British Army
- Type: Armoured
- Size: Regiment
- Part of: Royal Armoured Corps

158th Regiment Royal Armoured Corps (South Wales Borderers) (158 RAC) was a short-lived armoured regiment of the British Army's Royal Armoured Corps serving in India during World War II.

== Origin ==
158 RAC was formed on 15 July 1942 by the conversion to the armoured role of the 6th Battalion, South Wales Borderers, a hostilities-only battalion raised in July 1940, assigned to the 212th Independent Infantry Brigade (Home), serving with the 10th Gloucestershire Regiment, 18th Welch Regiment (which left in May 1941) and the 9th Royal Sussex Regiment. In common with other infantry battalions transferred to the Royal Armoured Corps, the personnel of 158 RAC would have continued to wear their South Wales Borderers cap badge on the black beret of the RAC. Personnel unsuited to fighting in tanks were weeded out by psychiatrists.

== Service ==
158 RAC embarked for passage from the United Kingdom to India on 26 October 1942, arriving on 20 December and moving to Poona. There it came under command of the 255th Indian Tank Brigade. However, there was a change of policy, and on 1 April 1943 the regiment was re-converted to infantry, reverting to its previous title of 6 SWB and coming under command of 72nd Indian Infantry Brigade, still serving alongside the 10th Glosters and 9th Royal Sussex (both of which had also been converted, into 159 RAC and 160 RAC respectively).
