= 159th Regiment Royal Armoured Corps =

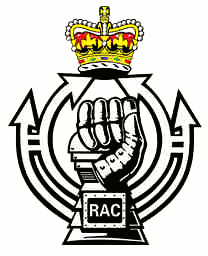
- Badge of the Royal Armoured Corps
- Active: 1942–1943
- Disbanded: 1 April 1943
- Country: United Kingdom
- Branch: British Army
- Type: Armoured
- Size: Regiment
- Part of: Royal Armoured Corps

159th Regiment Royal Armoured Corps (159 RAC) was a short-lived armoured regiment of the British Army's Royal Armoured Corps serving in India during World War II.

== Origin ==
159 RAC was formed on 15 July 1942 by the conversion to the armoured role of the 10th Battalion, Gloucestershire Regiment, a hostilities-only battalion raised two years before in July 1940, and had been assigned to the 212th Independent Infantry Brigade (Home), which also included the 6th South Wales Borderers, 18th Welch Regiment (which left in May 1941) and the 9th Royal Sussex Regiment, all of which had also been formed around the same time. In common with other infantry battalions transferred to the Royal Armoured Corps, the personnel of 159 RAC, those not weeded out by psychiatrists, would have continued to wear their Glosters cap badge on the black beret of the RAC.

== Service ==
159 RAC embarked for passage from the United Kingdom to India on 26 October 1942, arriving on 20 December and moving to Nira Camp near Poona. There it came under command of 255th Indian Tank Brigade. However, there was a change of policy, and on 1 April 1943 the regiment was re-converted to infantry, reverting to its previous title of 10th Glosters and coming under command of 72nd Indian Infantry Brigade and still serving with the 6th SWB and 9th Royal Sussex (both of which had been converted, into 158 RAC and 160 RAC respectively).
