= 160th Regiment Royal Armoured Corps =

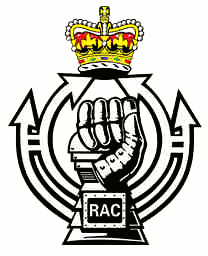
- Badge of the Royal Armoured Corps
- Active: 1942–1943
- Disbanded: 1 April 1943
- Country: United Kingdom
- Branch: British Army
- Type: Armoured
- Size: Regiment
- Part of: Royal Armoured Corps

160th Regiment Royal Armoured Corps (160 RAC) was a short-lived armoured regiment of the British Army's Royal Armoured Corps serving in India during World War II.

== Origin ==
160 RAC was formed on 15 July 1942 by the conversion to the armoured role of the 9th Battalion, Royal Sussex Regiment, a hostilities-only battalion created two years before in July 1940 and which had been assigned to the 212th Independent Infantry Brigade (Home), serving alongside the 6th South Wales Borderers, 10th Gloucestershire Regiment and the 18th Welch Regiment (which had left by May 1941), all of which had also been raised in July 1940. In common with other infantry battalions transferred to the Royal Armoured Corps, the personnel of 160 RAC, those not weeded out by psychiatrists, would have continued to wear their Royal Sussex cap badge on the black beret of the RAC.

== Service ==
160 RAC embarked for passage from the United Kingdom to India on 29 October 1942, arriving on 22 December and moving to Secunderabad. There it came under command of 267th Indian Armoured Brigade. Later it moved to Poona. However, there was a change of policy, and on 1 April 1943 the regiment was re-converted to infantry, reverting to its previous title of 9th Royal Sussex and coming under command of 72nd Indian Infantry Brigade and, again, serving alongside the 6th SWB and 10th Glosters (both had also been converted, into 158 RAC and 159 RAC, respectively and later re-converted).
