= 267th Brigade =

267th Brigade may refer to:

- 267th Indian Armoured Brigade, British India
- 267th Brigade, Royal Field Artillery, United Kingdom
