= 212th Brigade (United Kingdom) =

212th Independent Infantry Brigade (Home) 212th Independent Infantry Brigade
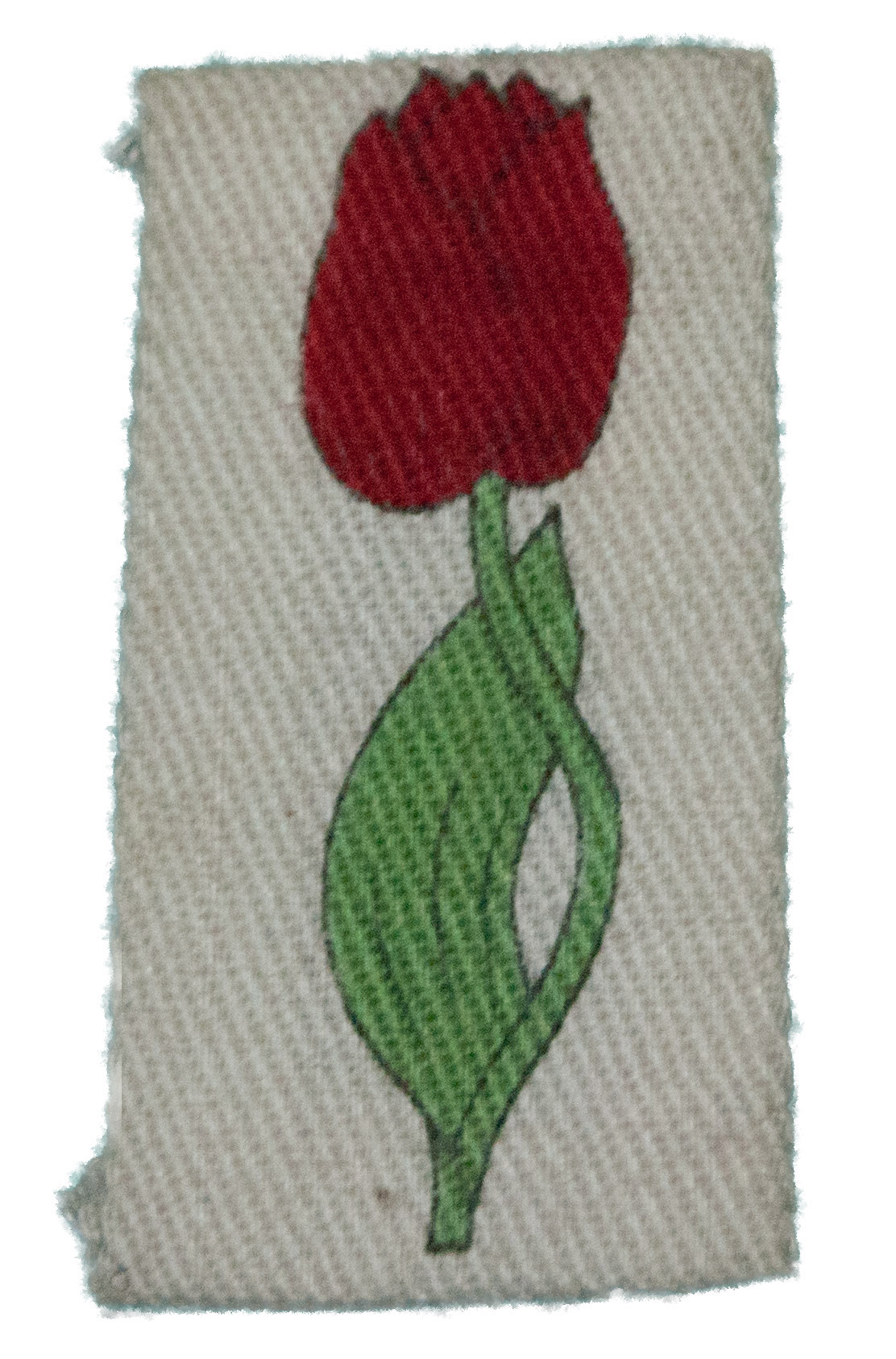
- Lincolnshire County Division Insignia
- Active: 1916 – 8 April 1918; 7 October 1940 – 16 October 1942
- Country: United Kingdom
- Branch: British Army
- Type: Infantry Brigade
- Role: Training and Home Defence

The 212th Brigade was a Home Service formation of the British Army during the First and the Second World Wars.

== First World War ==
The 212th Brigade was part of the 71st Division, a Home Service division raised in late 1916. It had the dual role of training men for overseas drafts and providing forces for home defence. The brigade was previously known as the 6th Provisional Brigade.

=== Order of Battle ===
The following infantry battalions served in the brigade:

- 61st Provisional Battalion, became 11th Battalion, Norfolk Regiment
- 100th Provisional Battalion, became 29th (City of London) Battalion, London Regiment
- 101st Provisional Battalion, became 30th (City of London) Battalion, London Regiment
- 249th Graduated Battalion, became 51st (Graduated) Battalion, Bedfordshire Regiment
- 250th Graduated Battalion, became 52nd (Graduated) Battalion, Middlesex Regiment

On 10 January 1918 orders were issued to break up 71st Division. Disbandment began in January 1918 and its last elements disappeared on 8 April 1918.

== Second World War ==
=== Formation and Service ===
A new brigade was formed under the title of the 212th Independent Infantry Brigade (Home) for service in the United Kingdom on 7 October 1940 by No 12 Infantry Training Group in South Wales Area. It was commanded by Brigadier H.A.R. Aubrey (Brigadier R.B.L. Persse from 13 May 1941) and composed of newly raised infantry battalions.

The brigade moved to North Midland Area (9 February – 26 March 1941) and then became an integral part of the new Lincolnshire County Division (27 March – 20 November 1941). When the county division ceased to function, the brigade was re-designated the 212th Independent Infantry Brigade, coming under the administrative control of 54th (East Anglian) Infantry Division (21 November 1941 – 24 May 1942) and then II Corps District.

=== Order of Battle ===
The composition of 212th Brigade was as follows:

- 9th Battalion, Royal Sussex Regiment (7 October 1940 – 14 July 1942, converted the next day to the 160 RAC.)
- 6th Battalion, South Wales Borderers (7 October 1940 – 14 July 1942, converted the next day to the 158 RAC.)
- 18th Battalion, Welch Regiment (7 October 1940 – 28 May 1941)
- 10th Battalion, Gloucestershire Regiment (7 October 1940 – 14 July 1942, converted the next day to the 159 RAC.)

The regiments converted to armour were sent to India, where they were reconverted to infantry and made up the newly reformed 72nd Infantry Brigade. On 16 August 1942, the Brigade HQ became an administrative HQ under GHQ Home Forces and eased to function as a command HQ.
