= Harry Wells (VC) =

English recipient of the Victoria Cross

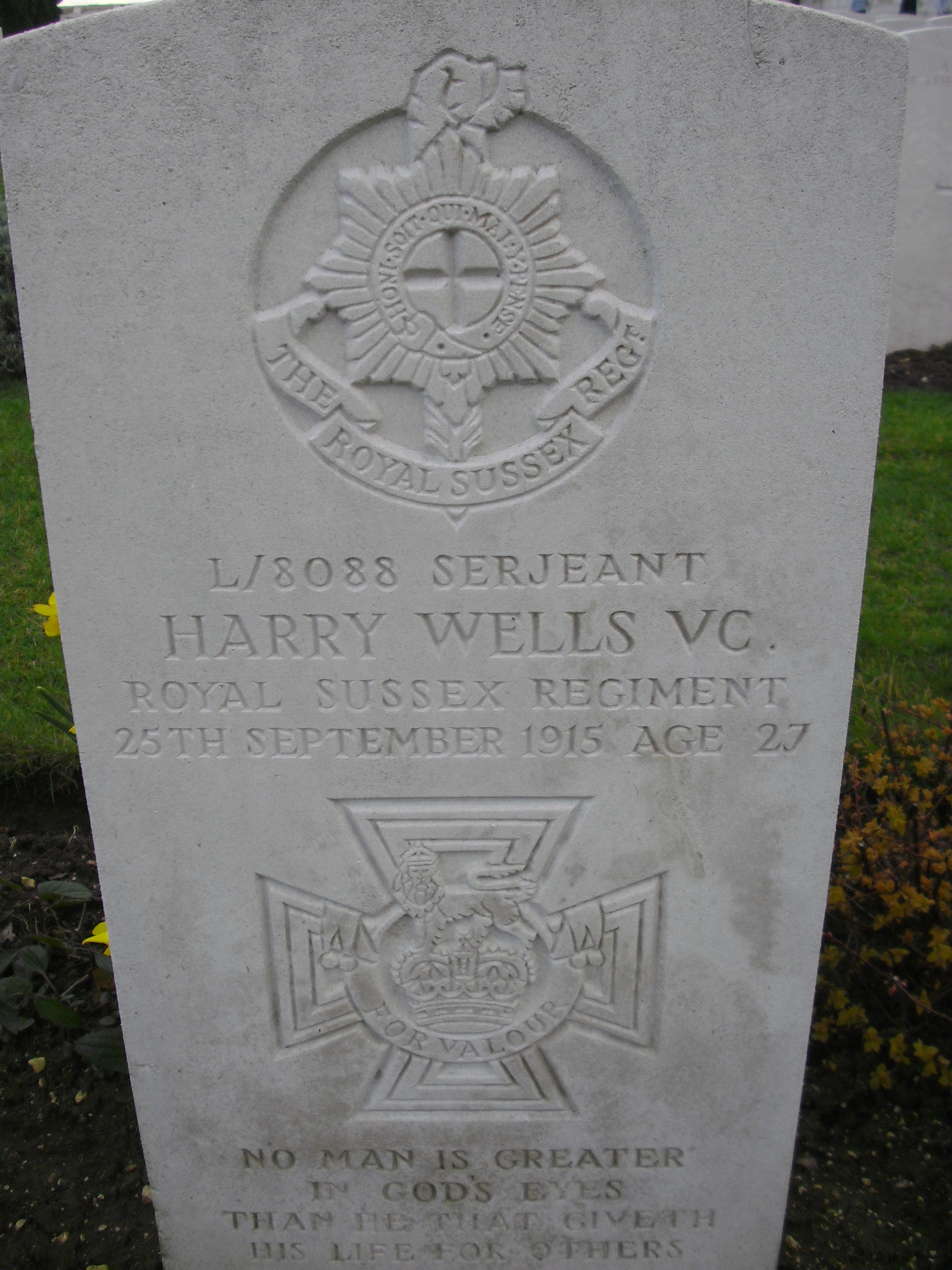
- Harry Wells VC Headstone at Dud Corner Cemetery
- Born: 19 September 1888; Herne Bay, Kent
- Died: 25 September 1915 (aged 27); Near Le Rutoire, Loos, France
- Burial place: Dud Corner Cemetery
- Military career
- Allegiance: United Kingdom
- Branch: British Army
- Rank: Sergeant
- Units: Royal Sussex Regiment
- Conflicts: World War I: Battle of Loos †
- Awards: Victoria Cross
- Other work: Police officer

Harry Wells VC (19 September 1888 – 25 September 1915) was an English recipient of the Victoria Cross, the highest and most prestigious award for gallantry in the face of the enemy that can be awarded to British and Commonwealth forces.

== Details ==
Wells was 27 years old, and a sergeant in the 2nd Battalion, The Royal Sussex Regiment, British Army during the First World War when the following deed took place for which he was awarded the VC.

For most conspicuous bravery near Le Retoire on 25th September, 1915. When his Platoon Officer had been killed he took command and led his men forward to within fifteen yards of the German wire. Nearly half the Platoon were killed or wounded, and the remainder were much shaken, but with the utmost coolness and bravery Serjeant Wells rallied them and led them forward. Finally, when very few were left, he stood up and urged them forward once more, but while doing this he was killed. He gave a magnificent example of courage and determination.

== Further information ==
Wells is buried in Dud Corner Cemetery, Le Rutoire, near Loos. 2 miles NW of Lens. Plot V, Row E, Grave 2.

== The medal ==
His VC is displayed at the Police Museum, Faversham, Kent.

== Bibliography ==
- Batchelor, Peter; Matson, Christopher (2011). The Western Front 1915. VCs of the First World War. Stroud, Gloucestershire: The History Press. ISBN 978-0-7524-6057-4.
- Ingleton, Roy (2011). Kent VCs. Pen and Sword Books. ISBN 978-1848844094.
- Oldfield, Paul (2015). Victoria Crosses on the Western Front, April 1915–June 1916. Pen and Sword Books. ISBN 978-1783030439.
