= 72nd Brigade (United Kingdom) =

72nd Brigade 72nd Independent Infantry Brigade 72nd Infantry Brigade
- Formation sign for the 72nd Independent Infantry Brigade, January 1941 — June 1943.
- Active: 1914 — 1919; 21 January 1941 — 1 June 1943; 28 April 1944—
- Country: United Kingdom
- Branch: British Army
- Type: Infantry Brigade
- Role: Infantry

Insignia
- 72nd Brigade battle patches used in the First World War, from August 1916.: Top (l-r) 8th Queen's (West Surrey), 9th East Surrey, 8th Royal West Kent, 1st N Staffs. Lower 72nd MG Company.

- Formation sign of the 72nd Indian Infantry Brigade.: Used with the 29th Brigade's sign to form the 39th Division's sign.

The 72nd Brigade was an infantry brigade formation of the British Army in the First World War and the Second World War.

== First World War ==
=== Formation and Service ===
It was raised as part of the new army (Kitchener's Army) and assigned to the 24th Division and served on the Western Front during the First World War.

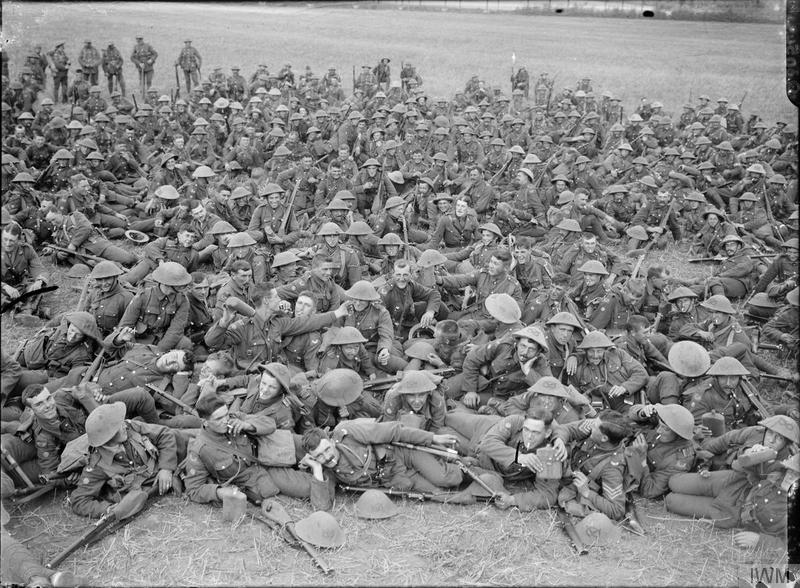
Men of the 1st Battalion North Staffordshire Regiment near Cassel, 12 September 1917.

The brigade was disbanded after the war.

=== Order of battle ===
During the First World War the following units served in the 72nd Brigade.

- 8th (Service) Battalion, Queen's (Royal West Surrey Regiment) (to 17th Brigade in February 1918)
- 8th (Service) Battalion, Buffs (East Kent Regiment) (to 17th Brigade in October 1915)
- 9th (Service) Battalion, East Surrey Regiment
- 8th (Service) Battalion, Queen's Own (Royal West Kent Regiment)
- 1st Battalion, Prince of Wales's (North Staffordshire Regiment) (from 17th Brigade in October 1915)
- 72nd Machine Gun Company
- 72nd Trench Mortar Battery

== Second World War ==
=== Formation and Service ===
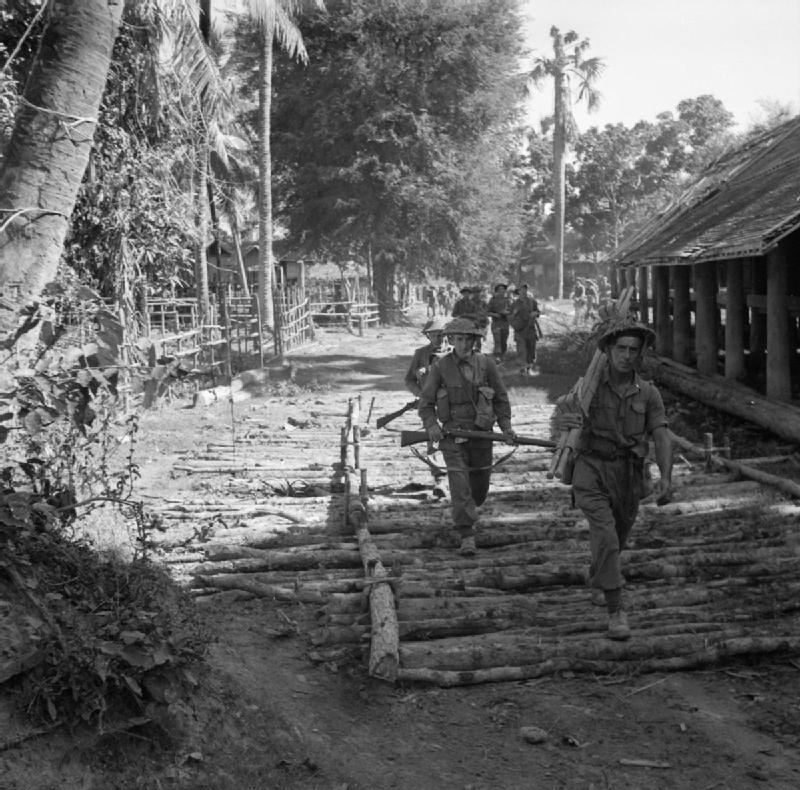
Men of the 6th Battalion, South Wales Borderers march through Bahe en route for Mandalay, January 1945.

In January 1941, the 72nd Independent Infantry Brigade was formed. In 1943, the Brigade HQ was re-designated the 5th Parachute Brigade after its units were dispersed. A new 72nd Infantry Brigade was formed on 28 April 1944 from the 72nd Indian Infantry Brigade which was renamed and joined the 36th Infantry Division.

=== Order of battle ===
During the Second World War the following units served in the Brigade.

- As the 72nd Independent Infantry Brigade
  - 13th Battalion, Royal Welch Fusiliers (21 January 1941 — 24 September 1942)
  - 6th Battalion, Royal Inniskilling Fusiliers (21 January 1941 — 14 January 1942)
  - 15th Battalion, South Staffordshire Regiment (21 January 1941 — 25 May 1942)
  - 4th Battalion, East Lancashire Regiment (14 January 1942 — 8 October 1942)
  - 11th Battalion, Devonshire Regiment (8 October 1941 — 25 May 1943)
  - 9th Battalion, Somerset Light Infantry (9 September 1942 — 21 May 1943)
- As the 72nd Infantry Brigade in India
  - 6th Battalion, South Wales Borderers (28 April 1944 — 18 July 1945)
  - 10th Battalion, Gloucestershire Regiment (28 April 1944 — 31 August 1945)
  - 9th Battalion, Royal Sussex Regiment (28 April 1944 — 31 August 1945)

== Bibliography ==
- Cole, Howard (1973). Formation Badges of World War 2 Britain, Commonwealth and Empire. London: Arms and Armour Press.
- Hibbard, Mike; Gibbs, Gary (2016). Infantry Divisions, Identification Schemes 1917 (1 ed.). Wokingham: The Military History Society.
- Joslen, H. F. (2003) [1960]. Orders of Battle: Second World War, 1939–1945. Uckfield, East Sussex: Naval and Military Press. ISBN 978-1-84342-474-1.
