= 163rd Regiment Royal Armoured Corps =

Armoured Corps

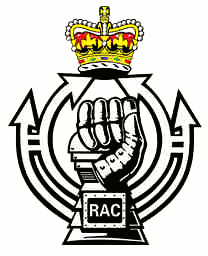
- Cap badge of the Royal Armoured Corps.
- Active: 1942–1944
- Disbanded: 1 December 1944
- Country: United Kingdom
- Branch: British Army
- Type: Armoured
- Size: Regiment
- Part of: Royal Armoured Corps
- Engagements: World War II

The 163rd Regiment Royal Armoured Corps (163 RAC) was a short-lived armoured regiment of the British Army's Royal Armoured Corps that served in India during World War II.

== Origin ==
163 RAC was formed by the conversion to the armoured role of the 13th Battalion, Sherwood Foresters, a hostilities-only battalion raised in 1940, on 30 July 1942, the day after it arrived in India. In common with other infantry battalions transferred to the Royal Armoured Corps, the personnel of 163 RAC would have continued to wear their Foresters cap badge on the black beret of the Royal Armoured Corps.

== Service ==
163 RAC was stationed at Rawalpindi under command of 267th Indian Armoured Brigade. However, there was a change of policy, and on 1 December 1944 (also reported as 1 December 1943) the regiment was re-converted to infantry, reverting to its previous title of 13th Foresters and coming under command of 67 Indian Training Brigade.
