= Alfred Aslett =

English rugby union player

Brigadier Alfred Aslett DSO
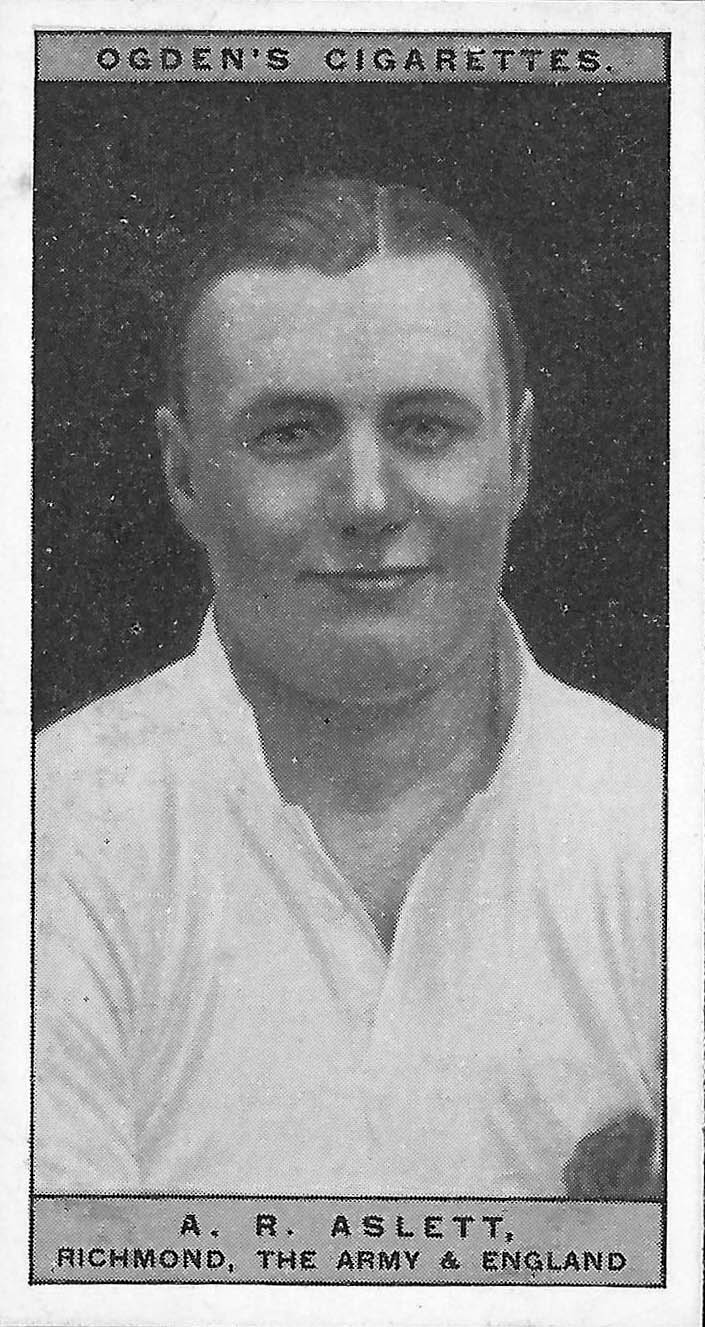
- Born: Alfred Rimbault Aslett; 14 January 1901; Calcutta, India
- Died: 15 May 1980 (aged 79); Cowfold, Sussex, England
- School: Clifton College

Rugby union career
- Position: Centre
International career
Years	Team	Apps	(Points)
1926–29	England	6	(6)

Alfred Rimbault Aslett (14 January 1901 – 15 May 1980) was a British Army officer and an English international rugby union player.

Aslett was born in Calcutta, India, and educated at Clifton College.

A powerful centre three-quarter, Aslett played rugby in the army and for London club Richmond, while gaining six England caps during the 1920s. He made his first England trial in 1920 while at Sandhurst, but didn't debut until the 1926 Five Nations Championship, where he played all four of their matches and scored a two tries in a win over France at Twickenham. His other two appearances came in 1929.

Aslett was commissioned into the King's Own Royal Regiment. He commanded the 72nd Indian Infantry Brigade in Burma during World War II and was awarded the Distinguished Service Order (DSO) at the war's end, retiring soon after with the honorary rank of Brigadier.

== See also ==
- List of England national rugby union players
