= 267th Indian Armoured Brigade =

267th Indian Tank Brigade
- Active: 3 July 1942 – 1 April 1943
- Country: British India
- Allegiance: British Crown
- Branch: British Indian Army
- Type: Armoured
- Size: Brigade
- Part of: 43rd Indian Armoured Division
- Service: Second World War

The 267th Indian Tank Brigade was a short lived armoured brigade of the Indian Army during the Second World War. It was reconstituted as 72nd Indian Infantry Brigade.

== History ==
The brigade was formed on 3 July 1942 at Sialkot with three regiments of the Royal Armoured Corps. These were infantry battalions of the British Army that were converted to an armoured role:

- 116th Regiment Royal Armoured Corps formed on 24 July 1942 from 9th Battalion, Gordon Highlanders
- 160th Regiment Royal Armoured Corps formed on 15 July 1942 from 9th Battalion, Royal Sussex Regiment in the United Kingdom
- 163rd Regiment Royal Armoured Corps formed on 30 July 1942 from 13th Battalion, Sherwood Foresters

It moved to Secunderabad in October under the command of the 43rd Indian Armoured Division and then to Poona. The brigade was intended for service in the Burma Campaign during the Second World War but in the event it never left India. On 1 April 1943, it was reconstituted as the 72nd Indian Infantry Brigade.

== Units ==
The brigade commanded the following units:

- 116th Regiment Royal Armoured Corps (joined on 27 July 1942; left on 31 October 1942 for 255th Indian Armoured Brigade)
- 163rd Regiment Royal Armoured Corps (joined on 30 July 1942; left on 31 March 1943 when it reverted to 13th Sherwood Foresters in 67th Indian Training Brigade) (Note: Kempton acknowledges Joslen's information, but notes that there is no reference to a 67th Indian Training Brigade in any official Indian Army records or orders of battle.)
- 160th Regiment Royal Armoured Corps (joined on 22 December 1942; left on 1 April 1943 when it reverted to 9th Royal Sussex Regiment in 72nd Indian Infantry Brigade)
- 267th Armoured Brigade Signals Squadron (1942 to 1943; became 72nd Indian Infantry Brigade Signals Section)
- 111th Field Post Office (July 1942 to April 1943)

== See also ==
- List of Indian Army Brigades in World War II

== Bibliography ==
- Joslen, Lt-Col H.F. (1990) [1st. Pub. HMSO:1960]. Orders of Battle, Second World War, 1939–1945. London: London Stamp Exchange. ISBN 0-948130-03-2.
- Kempton, Chris (2003b). 'Loyalty & Honour', The Indian Army September 1939 – August 1947. Vol. Part II Brigades. Milton Keynes: The Military Press. ISBN 0-85420-238-2.
- Kempton, Chris (2003c). 'Loyalty & Honour', The Indian Army September 1939 – August 1947. Vol. Part III. Milton Keynes: The Military Press. ISBN 0-85420-248-X.
