= Royal Sussex Regiment =

British Army infantry regiment from 1881 to 1966

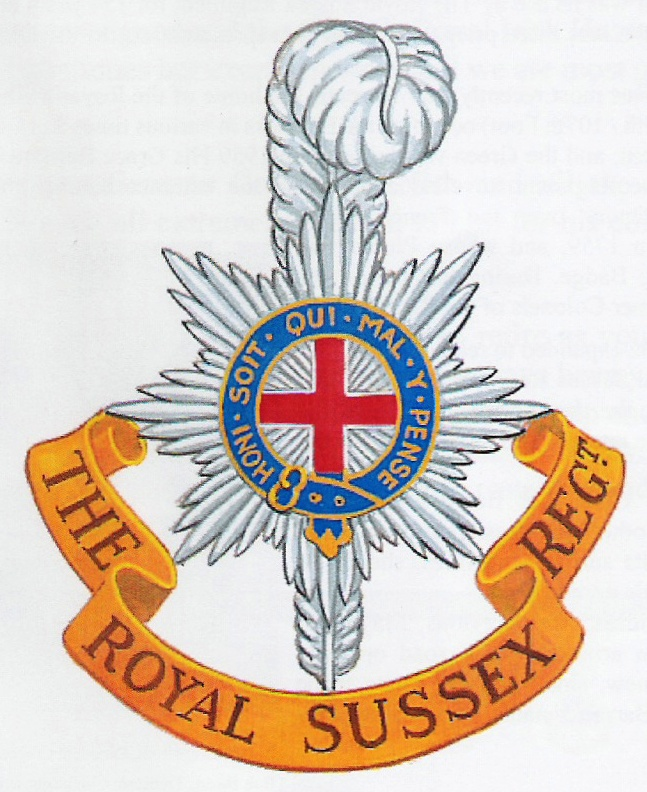
- Badge of the Royal Sussex Regiment.
- Active: 1881–1966
- Country: United Kingdom
- Branch: British Army
- Type: Infantry
- Role: Line infantry
- Size: 1–2 Regular battalions 1–2 Militia and Special Reserve battalions 1–3 Territorial and Volunteer battalions Up to 17 Hostilities-only battalions
- Garrison/HQ: Roussillon Barracks, Chichester
- Nicknames: The Prince of Orange's Own; The Orange Lilies; The Haddocks; The Iron Regiment
- Mottos: Honi soit qui mal y pense (unofficial) Nothing succeeds like Sussex
- March: The Royal Sussex (unofficial) Sussex by the Sea
- Anniversaries: 13 September – Quebec; 30 June (1916) – The Day Sussex Died
- Engagements: Egyptian Expedition; Second Boer War; World War I World War II

The Royal Sussex Regiment was a line infantry regiment of the British Army that was in existence from 1881 to 1966. The regiment was formed in 1881 as part of the Childers Reforms by the amalgamation of the 35th (Royal Sussex) Regiment of Foot and the 107th Regiment of Foot (Bengal Light Infantry). The regiment saw service in the Second Boer War, and both World War I and World War II.

On 31 December 1966, the Royal Sussex Regiment was amalgamated with the other regiments of the Home Counties Brigade – the Queen's Royal Surrey Regiment, the Queen's Own Buffs, The Royal Kent Regiment, and the Middlesex Regiment (Duke of Cambridge's Own) – to form the Queen's Regiment; which was later, on 9 September 1992, amalgamated with the Royal Hampshire Regiment to form the present Princess of Wales's Royal Regiment (Queen's and Royal Hampshires).

== History ==
=== 1881–1914 ===
The regiment was formed in 1881 as part of the Childers Reforms by the amalgamation of the 35th (Royal Sussex) Regiment of Foot and the 107th Regiment of Foot (Bengal Light Infantry), together with the Royal Sussex Light Infantry Militia and the Cinque Ports and Sussex units of the Volunteer Force. The 1st Battalion was sent to Egypt as part of General Garnet Wolseley's expedition to crush the ‘Urabi Revolt and conquer Egypt in the name of the Khedive. The 1st battalion was also part of the Nile Expedition, an unsuccessful attempt to save General Charles Gordon and his garrison at Khartoum during the Mahdist War. Twenty men of the regiment, led by Lieutenant Lionel Trafford, constituted the advanced party which marched towards Khartoum. The battalion took part in the Battle of Abu Klea in January 1885 when Muhammad Ahmad was defeated. After a couple of years back in England, the battalion was stationed in Ireland from 1891 to 1896, then at Malta in 1899.

The 2nd Battalion was stationed at Malta from 1882, then moved to India in 1885 and took part in the Hazara Expedition in 1888 and the North-West Frontier campaign 1897–1898. The battalion stayed in India until late 1902, when it returned home after more than 20 years′ foreign service.

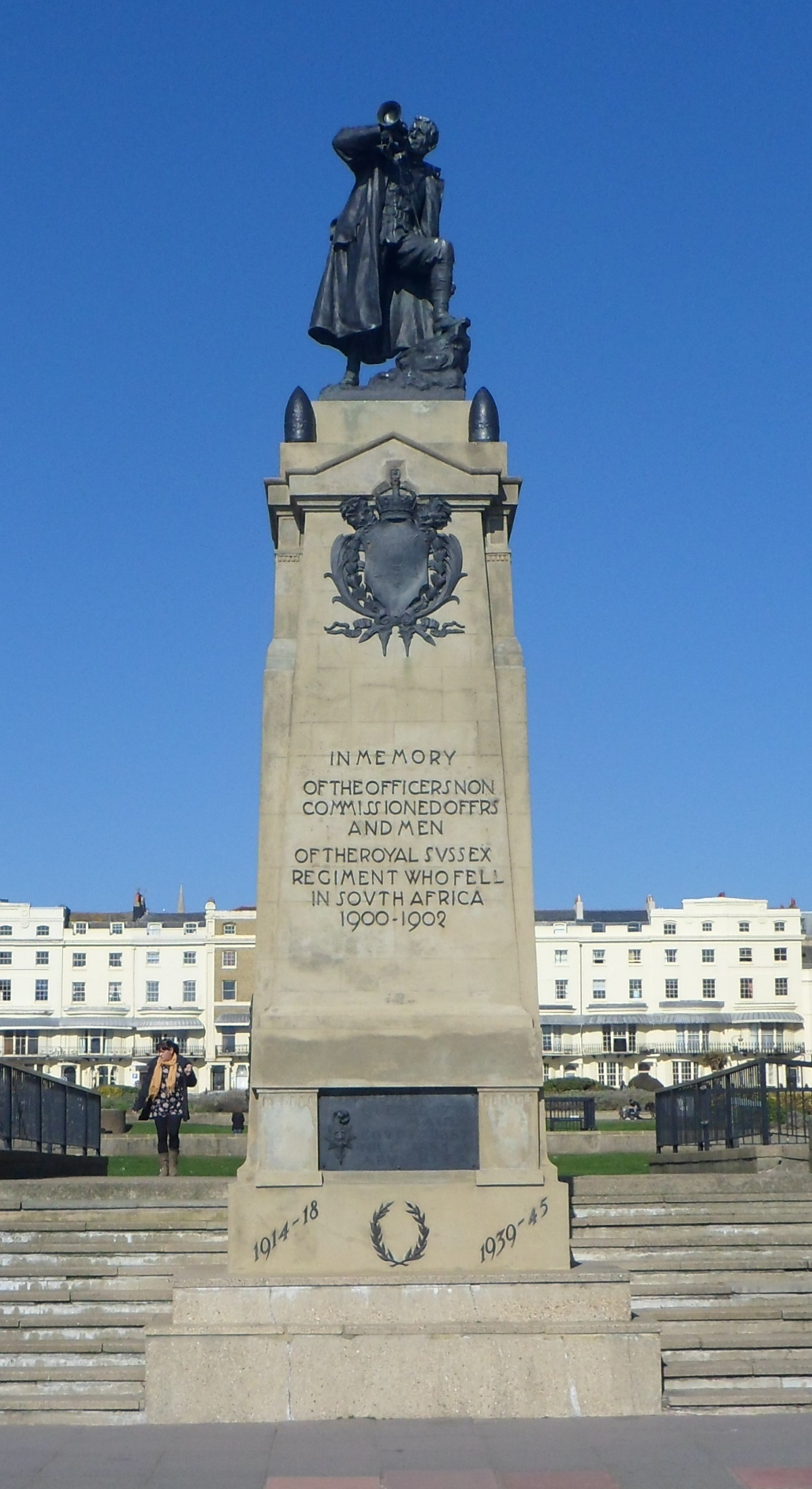
Second Boer War Memorial in Brighton

When the Second Boer War required more troops to reinforce British forces in South Africa, the 1st Battalion was sent there in February 1900, and fought at the Battle of Doornkop in May 1900. A memorial to the fallen of the Second Boer War, incorporating a sculpture by Charles Leonard Hartwell titled "The Bugler", is at Regency Square, Brighton. The Sergeant Bugler sounded the charge of The Royal Sussex that swept The Boers from their formidable position at Doornkop. A smaller bronze casting of The Bugler is held by the National Army Museum. A silver reduction copy is also held by The 2nd Battalion Princess of Wales's Royal Regiment Officers' Mess.

The Royal Sussex Light Infantry Militia formed the 3rd Battalion. It was embodied in December 1899 and embarked for South Africa to take part in the Second Boer War in March 1901. Most of the officers and men returned home on the SS Dominion in August 1902, after the war had ended two months earlier. The three Volunteer Battalions contributed to a service company that reinforced the 1st Battalion, and gained them the Battle honour.

Following the end of the war in South Africa, the 1st battalion transferred to India, where they were stationed at Sitapur in Bengal Presidency.

In 1908, the Volunteers and Militia were reorganised nationally, with the former becoming the Territorial Force (TF) and the latter the Special Reserve (SR); the regiment now had one Reserve battalion and three Territorial battalions. These were the 3rd (Reserve) Battalion (SR), with the 4th Battalion (TF) at Park Street in Horsham (since demolished), the 5th (Cinque Ports) Battalion (TF) at Middle Street in Hastings (since demolished) and the 6th (Cyclist) Battalion (TF) at Montpelier Place in Brighton (since demolished)

=== First World War ===
==== Regular Army ====
The 1st Battalion, which formed part of the 1st (Peshawar) Brigade in the 1st (Peshawar) Division, was one of the few infantry battalions that remained in India throughout the whole war, being stationed at Peshawar. However, it served in the Third Anglo-Afghan War in 1919.

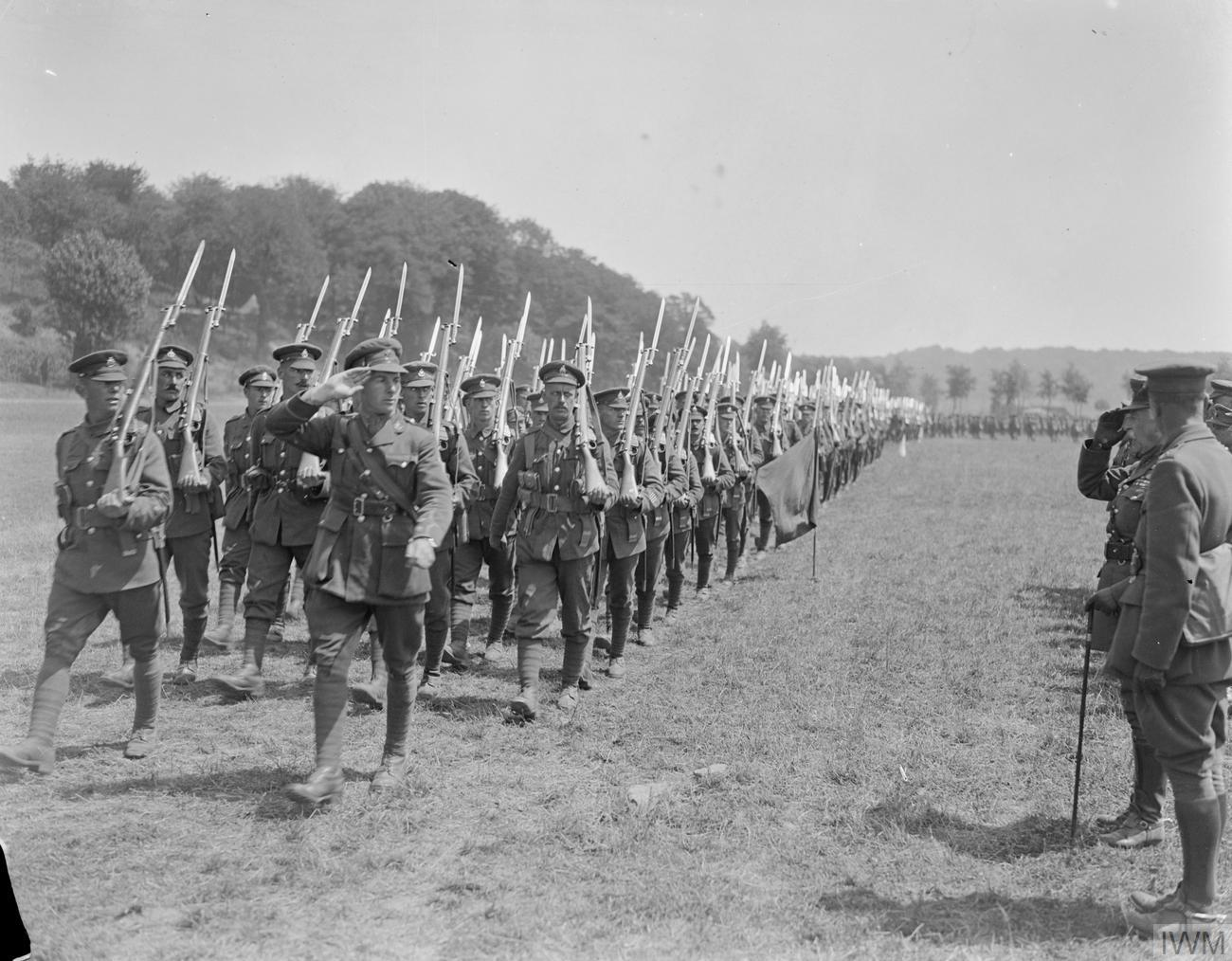
Men of the 2nd Battalion, Royal Sussex Regiment marching past Prince Arthur, Duke of Connaught, near Bruay, France, 1 July 1918

The 2nd Battalion landed in France as part of 2nd Brigade in the 1st Division in August 1914 and fought through the war on the Western Front. It took part in the Battle of Mons in August 1914, the Battle of the Marne in September 1914, the Battle of the Aisne in September 1914 and the First Battle of Ypres in November 1914 as well as the Battle of Aubers Ridge in May 1915. During the Battle of Loos in September 1915 Sergeant Harry Wells was awarded a posthumous Victoria Cross, when the battalion took part in an attack. The battalion took part in the Battle of the Somme in Autumn 1916, the British pursuit to the Hindenburg Line in Spring 1917, the Battle of Passchendaele in October 1917, the Battle of the Lys in April 1918 and the Second Battle of Arras in August 1918.

==== Territorial Force ====
Before the war the 4th and 5th battalions were Army Troops attached to the Home Counties Division. However, the division went to India without them. The 1/4th Battalion joined 160th Brigade in 53rd (Welsh) Division and landed at Suvla Bay in August 1915. After the Gallipoli campaign it was evacuated to Egypt and later served in Palestine, where it saw action at the battles of Gaza and Jerusalem. It moved to France in May 1918 for service on the Western Front in 34th Division. The 1/5th (Cinque Ports) Battalion landed in France as Army Troops in early 1915, seeing action from the Battle of Aubers Ridge with 1st Division in May 1915. It later joined 48th (South Midland) Division as divisional pioneers, seeing action at the Somme and Ypres before moving to Italy in November 1917. The 1/6th (Cyclist) Battalion remained on coast defence duties in England and Ireland for the whole war, but the 2/6th was converted to infantry and saw action with 16th Indian Division in Waziristan in 1917–19.

==== New Armies ====
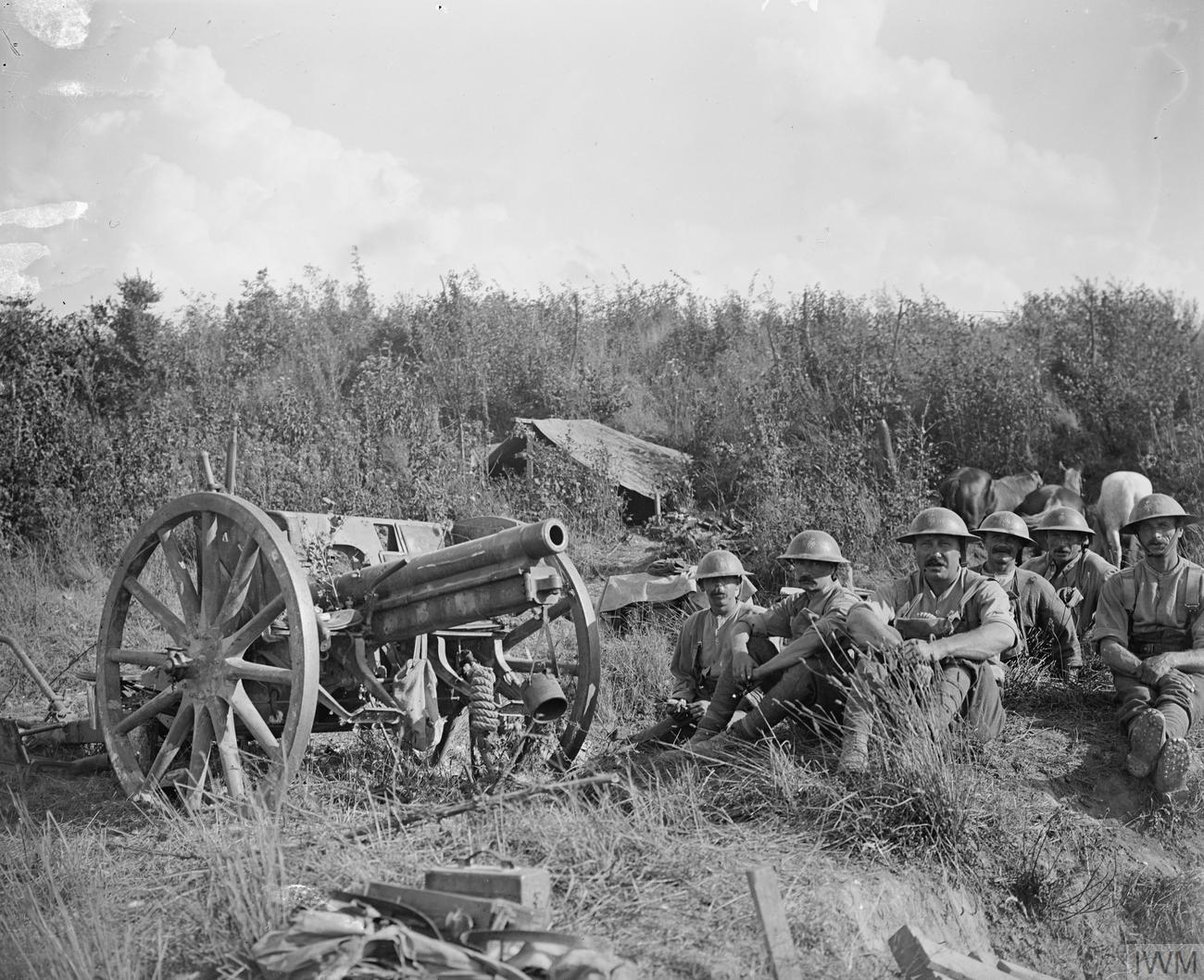
Tommies of the 7th (Service) Battalion, Royal Sussex Regiment, and one of the 7.7 cm (770 mm) FK 96 n.A. guns they captured. Near Moislains, France, 5 September 1918.

The 7th (Service) Battalion was formed in September 1914 by men volunteering for Lord Kitchener's New Armies and landed at Boulogne-sur-Mer as part of the 36th Brigade in the 12th (Eastern) Division in June 1915 for service on the Western Front.

The 8th (Service) Battalion (Pioneers) landed at Boulogne-sur-Mer as part of the 54th Brigade in the 18th (Eastern) Division in July 1915 also for service on the Western Front.

An outpost sentry of the 9th (Service) Battalion, Royal Sussex Regiment, in Lens, France, 3 September 1918.

The 9th (Service) Battalion landed at Boulogne-sur-Mer as part of the 73rd Brigade in the 24th Division in September 1915 also for service on the Western Front.

The 11th, 12th and 13th (Southdowns) battalions were all raised in late 1914 as part of the 116th Brigade of the 39th Division. All three battalions landed at Le Havre, France in March 1916 for service on the Western Front. All three battalions took part in the Battle of the Boar's Head in June 1916. After a bombardment of the German trenches the 12th and 13th Battalions went over the top (most for the first time) and, under heavy fire, attacked the enemy trenches, bombing and bayoneting their way in. The 11th Battalion supplied carrying parties. They succeeded in taking the German front line trench, holding it for some four hours, and even briefly took the second line trench for about half an hour, beating off repeated counterattacks, and only withdrew from the shortage of ammunition and mounting casualties. In regimental history this is known as The Day Sussex Died. Edmund Blunden, a second lieutenant in the 11th Battalion, wrote an excellent account of his experiences in his memoirs, Undertones of War (1928).

After the war, St George's Chapel, in Chichester Cathedral, was restored and furnished as a memorial to the fallen of the Royal Sussex Regiment. It now has all their names recorded on the panels that are attached to the chapel walls.

==== Victoria Crosses during World War I ====
- Sgt. Harry Wells – (posthumously for the Battle of Loos, 1915)
- Lt. Eric Archibald McNair – (Hooge in Belgium, 1916)
- C.S.M. Nelson Victor Carter – (posthumously for Richebourg-l'Avoué in France, 1916)
- Lieut. Col. D.G.Johnson – (Crossing the Sambre Canal, November 1918)

=== Second World War ===
==== Regular Army ====
The 1st Battalion was based in Egypt at the outbreak of the Second World War, having been sent to Palestine in 1938. The battalion was initially part of the 23rd Infantry Brigade. In October 1940, the battalion was transferred to the 7th Indian Infantry Brigade in the 4th Indian Infantry Division, with whom it remained for the rest of the war. The battalion, briefly commanded by Geoffrey Charles Evans, took part in the Western Desert campaign and the Italian Campaign, where it had a terrible time and was involved in the bloody Battle of Monte Cassino. In late 1944 the battalion was shipped across to Greece with Lieutenant-General Ronald Scobie and his III Corps, remaining there until 1946 to help calm the Greek Civil War after the German withdrawal.

The 2nd Battalion was a Regular Army unit that was based in Northern Ireland at the outbreak of war. The battalion, under the command of Lieutenant Colonel Manley James, were joined with the 4th and 5th Battalions of the regiment in the 133rd (Royal Sussex) Infantry Brigade as part of the 44th (Home Counties) Infantry Division. The 4th Royal Sussex Regiment was then commanded by Lieutenant Colonel Lashmer Whistler. The 2nd Battalion was sent to France in April 1940, to join the British Expeditionary Force (BEF), taking part in the Battle of France and the subsequent retreat to Dunkirk where they were evacuated to England in the Dunkirk evacuation. The brigade was sent to North Africa in May 1942, where they fought in the Battle of Alam el Halfa in September 1942 and the Battle of El Alamein in October 1942.

In 1943, the 2nd Battalion and volunteers from the 4th and 5th Royal Sussex were formed into the 10th Parachute Battalion of the Parachute Regiment, which was a part of the 4th Parachute Brigade, serving with the 1st Airborne Division. The brigade participated in Operation Slapstick, an amphibious landing on the Italian port of Taranto, as part of the Allied invasion of Italy. Then returning to England, the battalion then fought at Arnhem during the disastrous Operation Market Garden in September 1944 with the rest of the 1st Airborne Division. Captain Lionel Queripel, from the Royal Sussex was awarded the Victoria Cross posthumously, during the Battle of Arnhem. The 10th Parachute Battalion was disbanded in November 1945.

The 2nd Battalion was reraised, after the old one became the 10th Para, and joined the 4th and 5th Battalions in 133rd Brigade of 44th (Home Counties) Division. They were sent to Egypt and fought at the battles of Alam el Hamza and Alamein. Afterwards the brigade was sent to the forgotten theatre of war in Iraq and Persia in 1943 with the 6th Indian Infantry Division where they remained for the rest of the war, the 2nd Battalion joining the 24th Indian Infantry Brigade, and the merged 4th/5th Battalion joining the 27th Indian Infantry Brigade.

==== Territorial Army ====
The regiment also raised the 6th and 7th battalions (both 2nd Line Territorial Army duplicates of the 4th and 5th Battalions) which were both in the 37th (Royal Sussex) Infantry Brigade, part of the 12th (Eastern) Infantry Division. They also served in France with the BEF in 1940 but suffered heavy casualties during the fighting and were evacuated from Dunkirk. The 12th Division was disbanded in July 1940 due to the heavy number of casualties suffered. The main reason for such heavy casualties was because most of the men had had very little training and few had even fired a rifle. After the return to England, the 6th Battalion served as a home defence unit for the rest of the war and was disbanded after the war in 1946. The 7th Battalion defended Amiens against air raids and the German 1st Panzer Division, which captured the town on 20 May. The battalion was transferred to the Royal Artillery and converted into the 109th Light Anti-Aircraft Regiment, Royal Artillery.

==== Hostilities-only ====
The 8th (Home Defence) Battalion was raised in 1939, presumably from the National Defence Companies. The battalion was mainly composed of older and less fit men and remained in the United Kingdom throughout the war. The battalion was redesignated as the 30th Battalion in 1941 and it was disbanded in 1943.

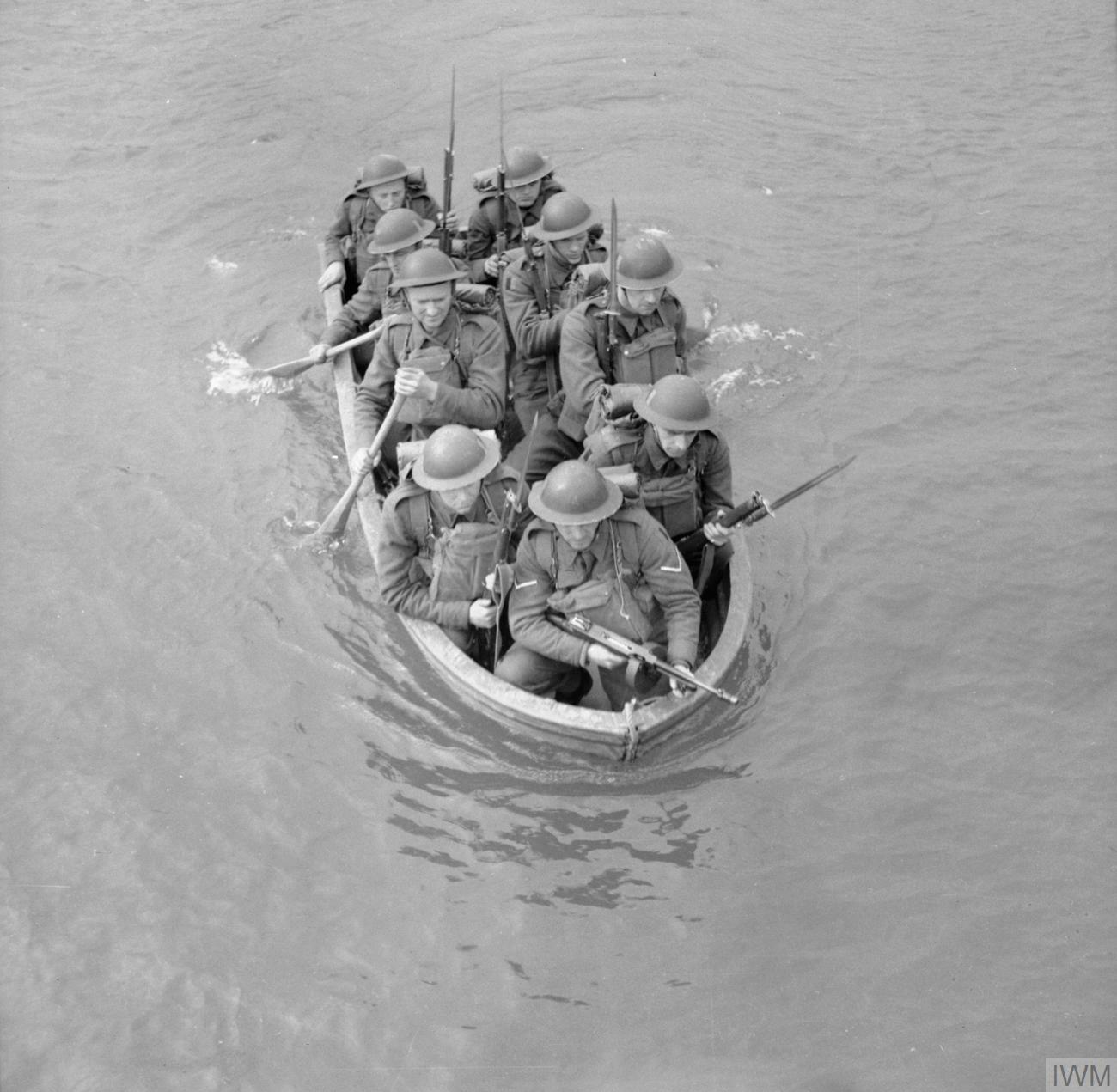
An infantry section from the Royal Sussex Regiment stage a river crossing in a collapsible boat, Chichester, 25 March 1941.

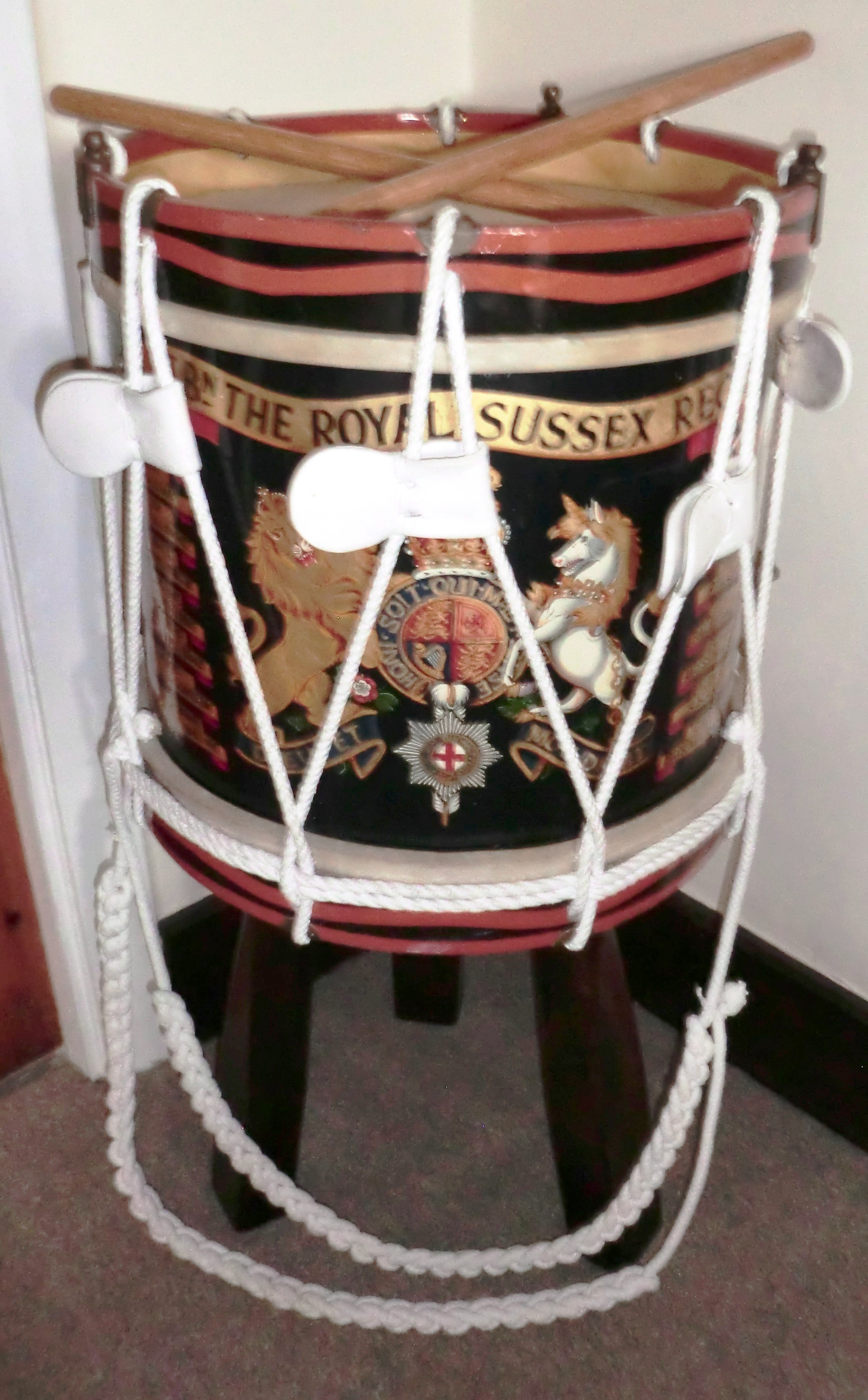
1930s regimental drum.

The 9th Battalion, Royal Sussex Regiment was created in July 1940. It was originally commanded by 41-year-old Lieutenant Colonel Gerald Templer. The battalion formed part of the 212th Independent Infantry Brigade (Home). In October 1942, the battalion was converted to armour as the 160th Regiment Royal Armoured Corps and joined the 267th Indian Armoured Brigade, which included other infantry units converted to armour. As with all infantry units converted in this way, they would still have worn their infantry capbadge on the black beret of the RAC. However, it returned to the infantry role in April 1943 and was sent with the 72nd Infantry Brigade to fight in the Burma Campaign with the British 36th Infantry Division, previously 36th Indian. The battalion saw action in the Arakan, was airlifted into Myitkyina and fought its way to Mandalay by April 1945.

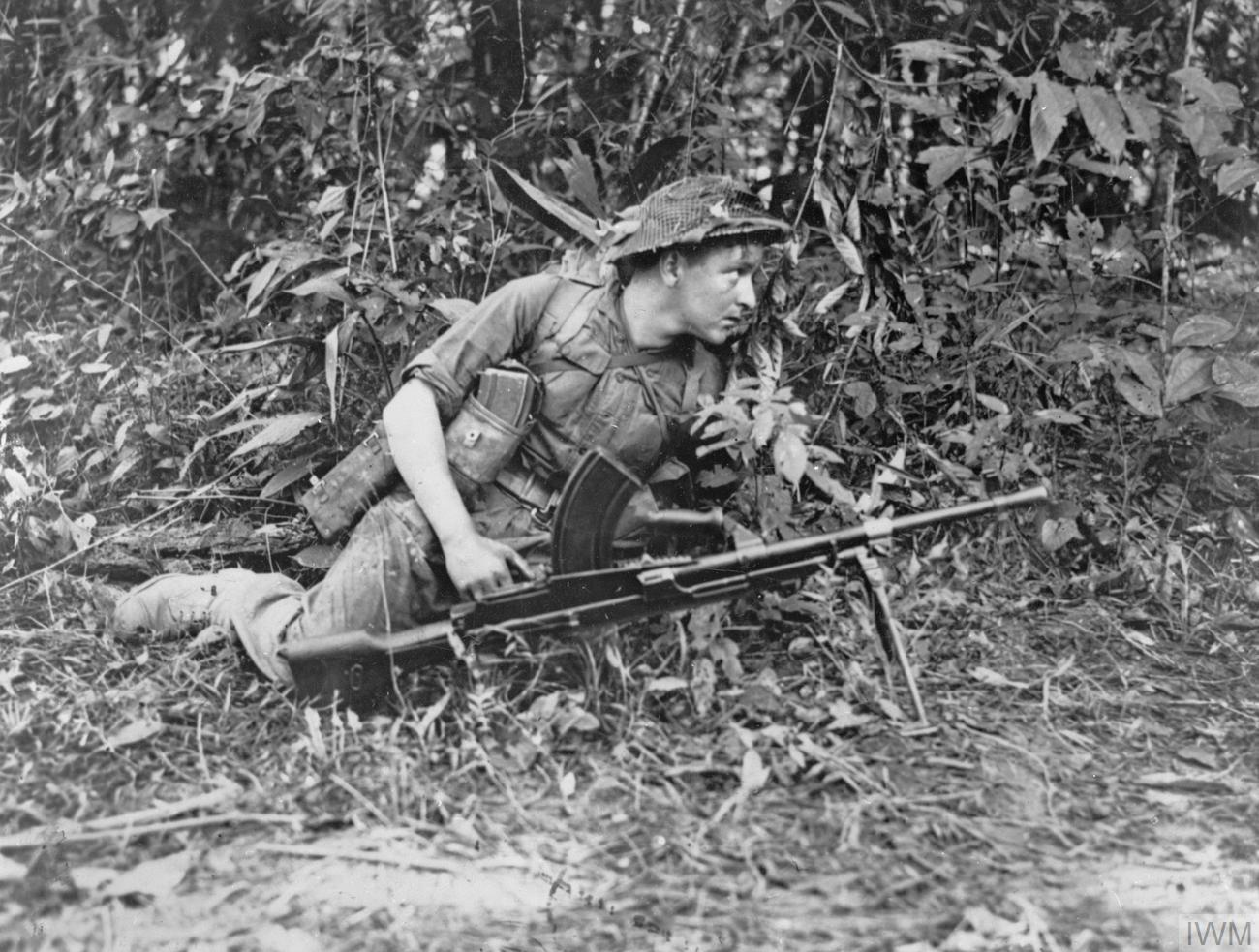
Private Putterill of the 9th Battalion, Royal Sussex Regiment armed with a Bren gun during a patrol, 22 November 1944.

The 10th Battalion was another hostilities-only battalion also raised in 1940 and joined the 219th Independent Infantry Brigade (Home), later the 203rd Brigade.

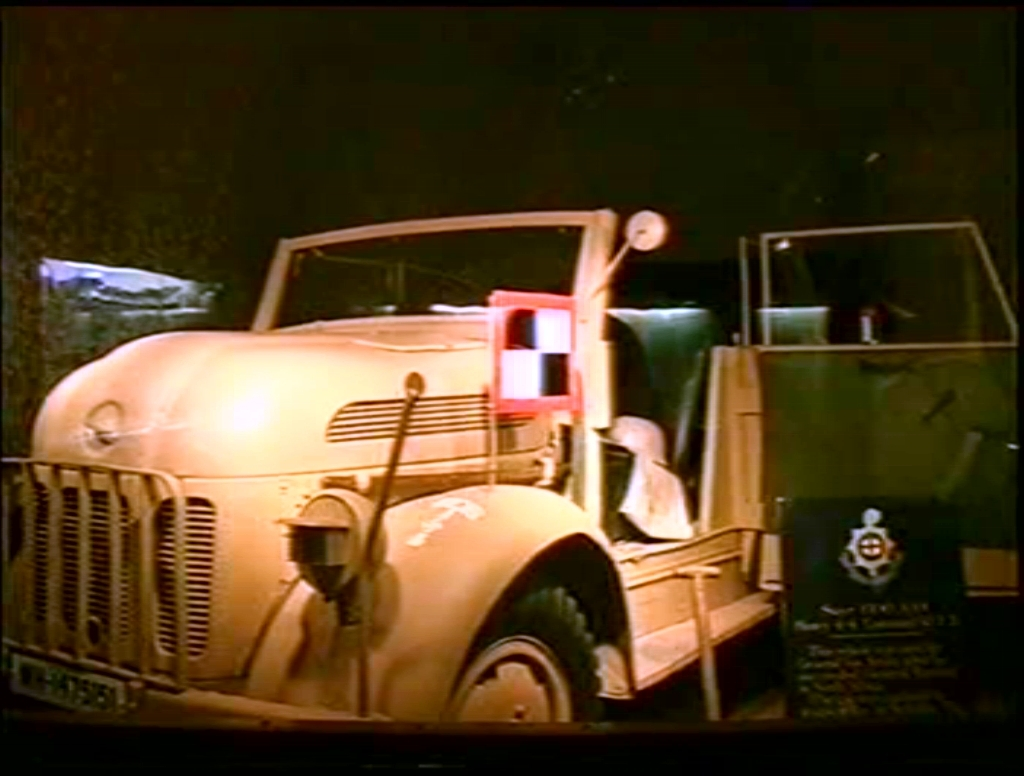
General Von Arnim's Staff Car at Eastbourne Redoubt.

=== Post 1945 ===
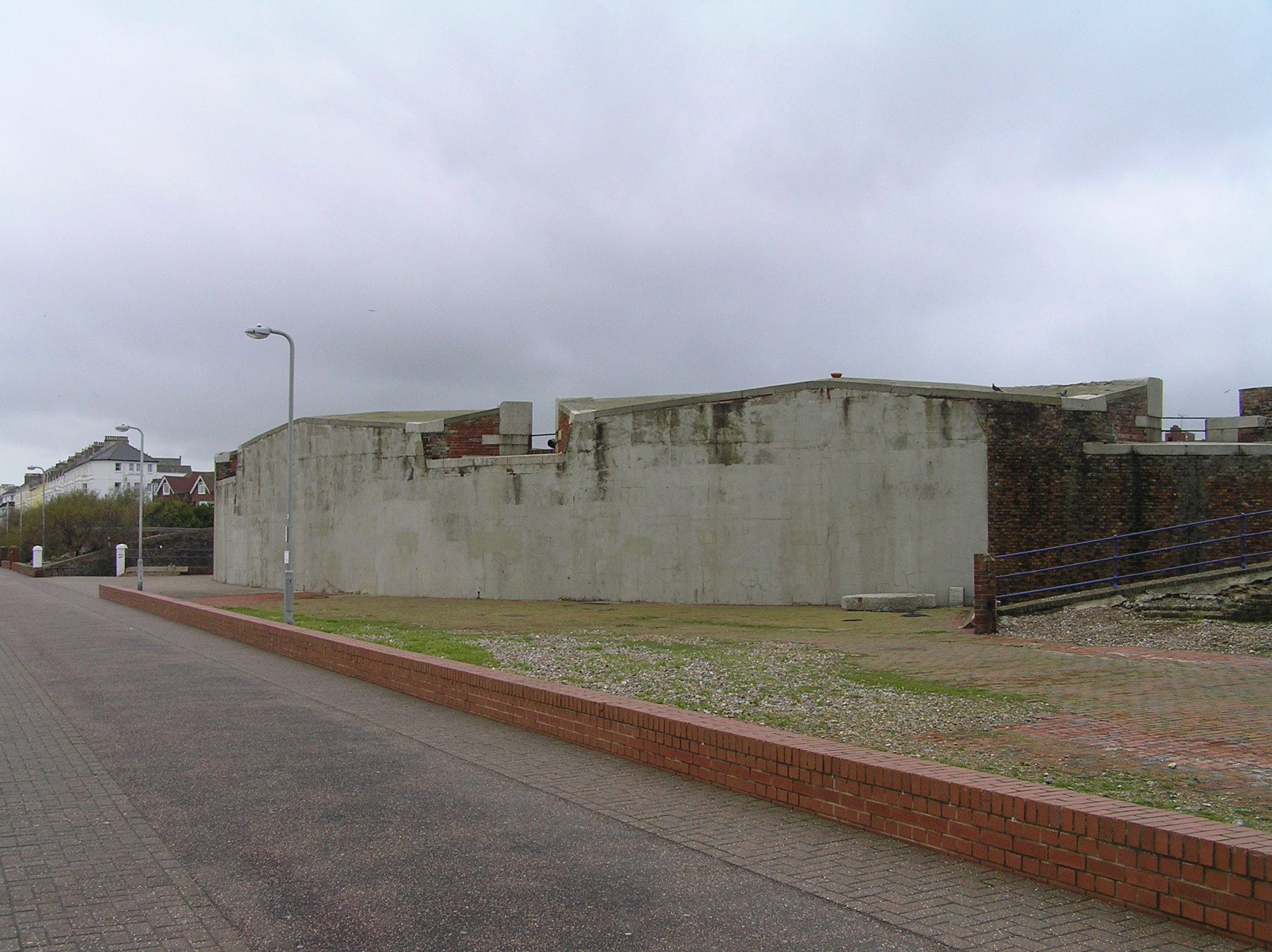
The Eastbourne Redoubt South Seaward facade

On 31 December 1966 the regiment was amalgamated with the Queen's Royal Surrey Regiment, the Queen's Own Buffs, The Royal Kent Regiment and the Middlesex Regiment to form the Queen's Regiment.

== Regimental museum ==
The Royal Sussex Regiment Museum and that of the Queen's Royal Irish Hussars is based at Eastbourne Redoubt in Sussex.

== Battle honours ==
The regiment's battle honours were as follows:

- From 35th Regiment of Foot: Maida.
- Gibraltar 1704–05, Louisburg, Quebec 1759, Martinique 1762, Havannah, St Lucia 1778, Egypt 1882, Abu Klea, Nile 1884–85, South Africa 1900–02.
- The Great War (23 battalions): Mons, Retreat from Mons, Marne 1914 '18, Aisne 1914, Ypres 1914 '17 '18, Gheluvelt, Nonne Bosschen, Givenchy 1914, Aubers, Loos, Somme 1916 '18, Albert 1916 '18, Bazentin, Delville Wood, Pozières, Flers-Courcelette, Morval, Thiepval, Le Transloy, Ancre Heights, Ancre 1916 '18, Arras 1917 '18, Vimy 1917, Scarpe 1917, Arleux, Messines 1917, Pilckem, Langemarck 1917, Menin Road, Polygon Wood, Broodseinde, Poelcappelle, Passchendaele, Cambrai 1917 '18, St Quentin, Bapaume 1918, Rosières, Avre, Lys, Kemmel, Scherpenberg, Soissonais-Ourcq, Amiens, Drocourt-Quéant, Hindenburg Line, Épéhy, St Quentin Canal, Beaurevoir, Courtrai, Selle, Sambre, France and Flanders 1914–18, Piave, Vittorio Veneto, Italy 1917–18, Suvla, Landing at Suvla, Scimitar Hill, Gallipoli 1915, Rumani, Egypt 1915–17, Gaza, El Mughar, Jerusalem, Jericho, Tell 'Asur, Palestine 1917–18, N.W. Frontier India 1915 1916–17, Murman 1918–19.
- Afghanistan 1919.
- The Second World War: Defence of Escaut, Amiens 1940, St Omer-La Bassée, Forêt de Nieppe, North-West Europe 1940, Karora-Marsa Taclai, Cub Cub, Mescelit Pass, Keren, Mt Engiahat, Massawa, Abyssinia 1941, Omars, Benghazi, Alam el Halfa, El Alamein, Akarit, Djebel el Meida, Tunis, North Africa 1940–43, Cassino I, Monastery Hill, Gothic Line, Pian di Castello, Monte Reggiano, Italy 1944–45, North Arakan, Pinwe, Shweli, Burma 1943–45.

== Colonel-in-Chief ==
The colonel-in-chief was as follows:

- 1953: HM Juliana, Queen of the Netherlands

== Regimental Colonels ==
The regimental colonels were as follows:

- 1881 (1st Bn): Gen. Henry Renny, CSI
- 1881–1883: (2nd Bn): Gen. Hon. Arthur Upton
- 188n–1885: (1st Bn): Gen. Sir Richard Thomas Farren, GCB
- 1885–1888: Lt-Gen. William Lenox Ingall, CB
- 1888–1895: Lt-Gen. Robert Julian Baumgartner, CB
- 1895–1898: Lt-Gen. John McNeill Walter, CB
- 1898–1900: Lt-Gen. Sir George Samuel Young, KCB
- 1900–1901: Gen. Sir John Davis, KCB
- 1901–1903: Lt-Gen. Sir Henry Francis Williams, KCB
- 1903–1914: Lt-Gen. Sir William Freeman Kelly, KCB
- 1914–1926: Maj-Gen. James Charles Young, CB
- 1926–1941: Brig-Gen. William Lushington Osborn, CB, CMG, DSO
- 1941–1942: Brig. Richard Maule Birkett, DSO
- 1942–1953: Brig. Thomas Francis Vere Foster, CBE, MC
- 1953–1963: Gen. Sir Lashmer Gordon Whistler, GCB, KBE, DSO
- 1963–1966: Brig. John Blackwood Ashworth, CBE, DSO

== Honorary Colonel ==
- 1941–1965: Col. Sir Winston Churchill, KG, OM, PC, CH, TD, DL, FRS, RA
  - (Honorary Colonel of the 4th/5th (Cinque Ports) Battalion, The Royal Sussex Regiment)

== Cultural references ==
In the film Atonement (2007), Robbie Turner's unit during the Battle of France is identified as the 1st Battalion, Royal Sussex Regiment: in fact, the 1st Battalion never served in France.

From 1942 to 1946 Peter Ustinov served as a private soldier with the Royal Sussex Regiment. He was batman for David Niven and the two became lifelong friends. Ustinov spent most of his service working with the Army Cinema Unit, where he was involved in making recruitment films, wrote plays and appeared in three films as an actor. At that time he co-wrote and acted in The Way Ahead (1944) (a.k.a. Immortal Battalion).

== See also ==
- History of Sussex

== Sources ==
- Buckman, Richard (2001). The Royal Sussex Regiment: 1864–1920. Hailsham: J & KH. ISBN 1-900511-66-5.
- Buckman, Richard (2004). The Royal Sussex Regiment: 1921–1966. Hailsham: J & KH. ISBN 1-900511-58-4.
- J.B.M. Frederick, Lineage Book of British Land Forces 1660–1978, Vol I, Wakefield: Microform Academic, 1984, ISBN 1-85117-007-3.
- Fox, Sylvia, ed. (2013). Not Forgetting The 9th: The War Diaries of Sgt. Cyril Grimes 1944–1945. TimeBox Press. ISBN 978-0-9550219-1-6.
- Gillings, Murray (1986). The Shiny 9th. Pinwe Club. ISBN 978-0-9511610-0-5.
- Heathcote, Tony (1999). The British Field Marshals 1736–1997. Barnsley (UK): Pen & Sword. ISBN 0-85052-696-5.
- Joslen, Lt-Col H. F. (2003) [1st pub. HMSO: 1960]. Orders of Battle, United Kingdom and Colonial Formations and Units in the Second World War, 1939–1945. Uckfield: Naval & Military. ISBN 1-84342-474-6.
- Kempton, Chris (2003). "Loyalty & Honour", The Indian Army September 1939 – August 1947. Vol. Part III. Milton Keynes: The Military Press. ISBN 0-85420-248-X.
- Martineau, G. D. (1955). A History of the Royal Sussex Regiment: a history of the Old Belfast regiment and the Regiment of Sussex, 1701–1953. Chichester: Moore & Tillyer.
- Mead, Richard (2007). Churchill's Lions: A biographical guide to the key British generals of World War II. Stroud: Spellmount. ISBN 978-1-86227-431-0.
- Brian Robson, Crisis on the Frontier: The Third Afghan War and the Campaign in Waziristan 1919–20, Staplehurst: Spellmount, 2004, ISBN 978-1-86227-211-8.
- Wiebkin, H. W. (1923). A Short History of the 39th (Deptford) Divisional Artillery 1915–1918. London: E. G. Berryman. OCLC 697621967.
