= 72nd Indian Infantry Brigade =

- Active: 1943–1944
- Country: (British Raj) British India
- Allegiance: British Empire
- Branch: British Indian Army
- Type: Infantry
- Size: Brigade
- Part of: 36th Indian Infantry Division
- Engagements: World War II * Burma Campaign

Commanders
- Notable commanders: A.R. Aslett

The 72nd Indian Infantry Brigade was an infantry brigade, of both the British and Indian Armies, formed in the United Kingdom in January 1941 during the Second World War. On 1 June 1943 it was re-designated as the British 72nd Infantry Brigade.

On 28 April 1943 a new 72nd Infantry Brigade was formed in India by the re-designation of the 72nd Indian Infantry Brigade, which had been formed a few weeks earlier in March 1943 as an infantry formation of the Indian Army during World War II. It was assigned to the 36th Indian Infantry Division, which became a British division on 1 September 1944.

== Composition in United Kingdom 1941-1943 ==
- 13th Battalion, Royal Welch Fusiliers (21 January 1941 - 24 September 1942)
- 6th Battalion, Royal Inniskilling Fusiliers (21 January 1941 - 14 January 1942)
- 15th Battalion, South Staffordshire Regiment (21 January 1941 - 25 May 1942)
- 4th Battalion, East Lancashire Regiment (14 January 1942 - 8 October 1942)
- 11th Battalion, Devonshire Regiment (8 October 1941 - 25 May 1943)
- 9th Battalion, Somerset Light Infantry (9 September 1942 - 21 May 1943)

== Composition with 36th Infantry Division, India, 1943- ==
- 6th Battalion, South Wales Borderers (28 April 1944 - 18 July 1945)
- 9th Battalion, Royal Sussex Regiment(28 April 1944 - 31 August 1945)
- 10th Battalion, Gloucestershire Regiment (28 April 1944 - 16 July 1945)
- 30th Field Company, Indian Engineers

== See also ==
- List of Indian Army Brigades in World War II

== Sources ==
- Joslen, HF, Orders of Battle Volume 1 United Kingdom and Colonial Formations and Units in the Second World War 1939 - 1945, London, HMSO 1960
- Foster, Geoffry, 36th Division - North Burma - 1944–45, England 1946
