= Wilfrid Smith (British Army officer) =

British Army officer (1867–1942)

Major-General Wilfrid Smith CB CMG
- Born: March 1867; Westminster, London, England
- Died: May 1942 (aged 75); Tavistock, Devon, England
- Military career
- Allegiance: United Kingdom
- Branch: British Army
- Rank: Major-General
- Commands: 1st Battalion, Lincolnshire Regiment; 80th Infantry Brigade; 52nd (Lowland) Division
- Conflicts: British expedition to Tibet; First World War
- Awards: Companion of the Order of the Bath; Companion of the Order of St Michael and St George

Major-General Wilfrid Edward Bownas Smith, CB, CMG (March 1867 – May 1942) was a senior British Army officer.

== Military career ==
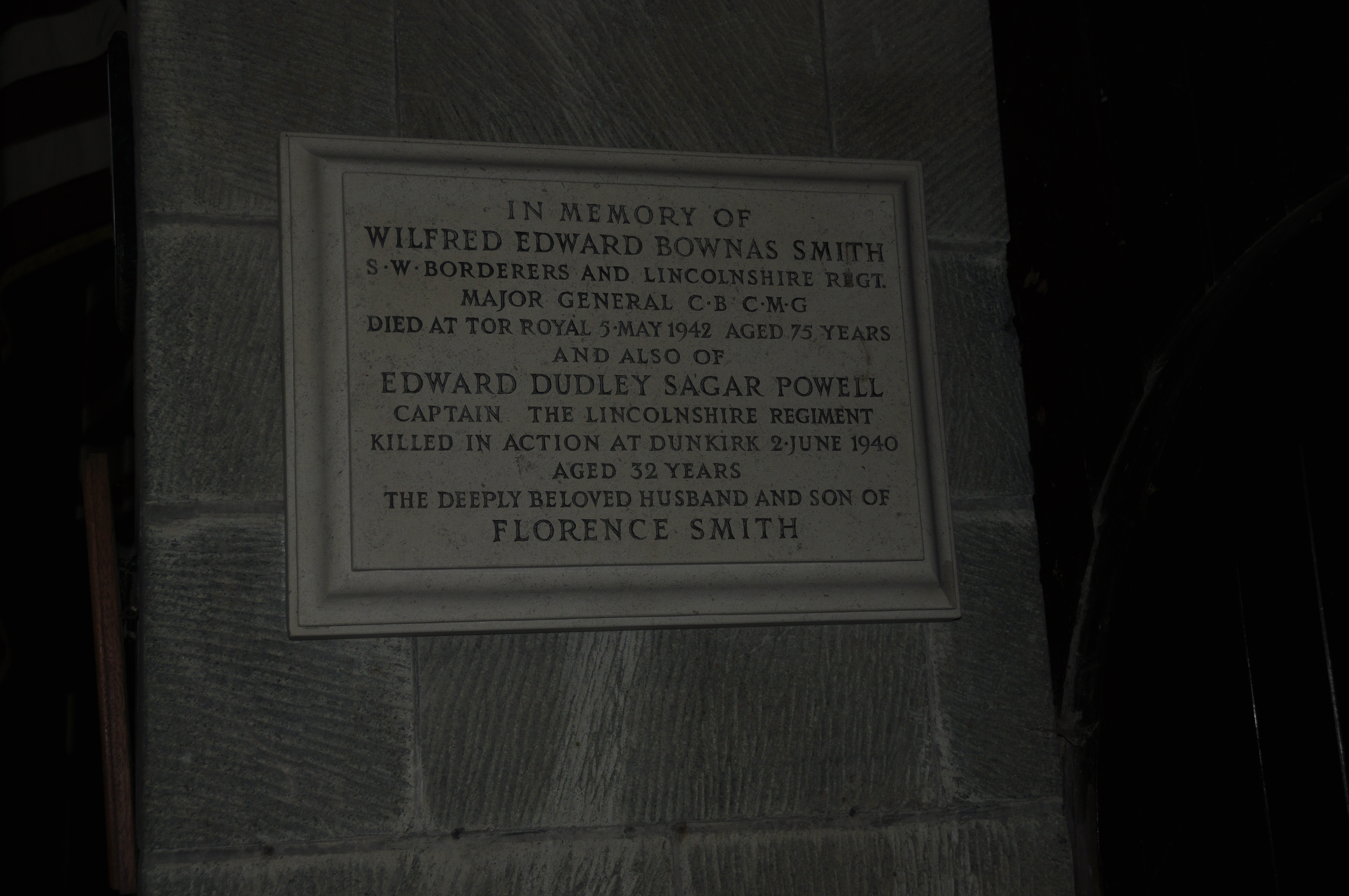
Memorial plaque in Church of St Michael, Princetown dedicated to Major General Wilfrid Smith.

Smith transferred from the Militia (the 3rd Brigade, Eastern Division, Royal Artillery, formerly the Suffolk Artillery Militia) into the South Wales Borderers on 9 May 1888.

Promoted to lieutenant in October 1891, he saw action with the British expedition to Tibet in 1903 and then became a brigade major in India in March 1905 and, promoted in September 1907 to major, became a deputy assistant adjutant general in India in 1908.

After transferring as a lieutenant colonel to the Lincolnshire Regiment (later the Royal Lincolnshire Regiment) in March 1914, he went on to be commanding officer (CO) of the 1st Battalion of his new regiment.

Several months later, after the British entry into World War I, he was, together with his battalion, deployed to France with the British Expeditionary Force (BEF). In March 1915 he was promoted to the temporary rank of brigadier general and took over command of the 80th Infantry Brigade from Brigadier General Charles Granville Fortescue, leading the brigade, which formed part of the 27th Division, on the Western Front and later on the Macedonian front. He was appointed a Companion of the Order of St Michael and St George in February 1915.

He was promoted to brevet colonel in June 1915 and in July 1916, after being made a temporary major general, became general officer commanding (GOC) of the 52nd (Lowland) Division in Egypt in June 1916 and saw action with the Egyptian Expeditionary Force (EEF) in the Middle Eastern theatre before removed from his division in September by General Sir Edmund Allenby, commander of the EEF, who believed Smith had "not shown the necessary tactical capacity for the command he held".

He was appointed a Companion of the Order of the Bath in December 1916, and reverted to his rank of brevet colonel which in March 1918 became substantive colonel.

He ceased to belong to the Reserve of Officers on 18 April 1922.

Military offices
Preceded by Herbert Lawrence	GOC 52nd (Lowland) Infantry Division; 1916–1917	Succeeded by John Hill
