= John Hill (Indian Army officer) =

British Indian Army general (1866–1935)

Major-General John Hill CB DSO
- Born: 14 January 1866; Bangalore, India
- Died: 8 January 1935 (aged 68); London, England
- Military career
- Allegiance: United Kingdom
- Branch: British Indian Army
- Service years: 1887–1920
- Rank: Major-General
- Units: Oxfordshire and Buckinghamshire Light Infantry; 15th Ludhiana Sikhs
- Commands: 52nd (Lowland) Division
- Conflicts: First World War
- Awards: Companion of the Order of the Bath; Distinguished Service Order; Order of the White Eagle, 3rd Class (Serbia)

Major-General John Hill CB DSO (14 January 1866 – 8 January 1935) was a senior British Indian Army officer during the First World War.

== Biography ==
Born in Bangalore on 14 January 1866, John Hill was educated at Bedford School and at the Royal Military College, Sandhurst. He was commissioned into the Oxfordshire and Buckinghamshire Light Infantry in February 1887, subsequently transferring to the 15th Ludhiana Sikhs. He served in Burma and India during the Chin Lushai Expedition, between 1889 and 1890, the Second Miranzai Expedition, in 1891, the Chitral Expedition, in 1895, and the Tirah campaign, between 1897 and 1898.

During the First World War he saw action in the Gallipoli campaign in 1915. He was promoted to the temporary rank of brigadier general in October 1915 and became general officer commanding (GOC) 52nd (Lowland) Infantry Division in September 1917 and saw action again, initially in the Sinai and Palestine campaign and then, from April 1918, on the Western Front before handing over his command in September 1918. He was promoted to major general in June 1918.

Hill was appointed aide-de-camp to King George V in 1916 and was appointed a Companion of the Order of the Bath in 1918. He retired in 1920 and died in London on 8 January 1935. Hill Square, part of Tel Aviv's Abattoir Hill is named for him.

Military offices
Preceded by Wilfrid Smith	GOC 52nd (Lowland) Infantry Division; 1917–1918	Succeeded by Francis Marshall
