= Sir John Laurie, 6th Baronet =

British Army general (1892–1983)

Major-General Sir John Laurie Bt CBE DSO* DL
- Born: 12 August 1892; Hertingfordbury, Hertfordshire, England
- Died: 10 January 1983 (aged 90)
- Military career
- Allegiance: United Kingdom
- Branch: British Army
- Service years: 1912–1945
- Rank: Major-General
- Service number: 4812
- Unit: Seaforth Highlanders
- Commands: Combined Operations Training Centre (1942–45); 52nd (Lowland) Infantry Division (1941–42); 157th Infantry Brigade (1940–41); 2nd Battalion, Seaforth Highlanders (1934–38); 6th Battalion, Seaforth Highlanders (1918–19)
- Conflicts: First World War; Second World War
- Awards: Commander of the Order of the British Empire; Distinguished Service Order & Bar; Mentioned in Despatches; Legion of Honour (France); King Haakon VII Freedom Cross (Norway)

Major-General Sir John Emilius Laurie, 6th Baronet, CBE, DSO & Bar, DL (12 August 1892 − 10 January 1983) was a British Army officer.

== Military career ==
Educated at Eton College and Royal Military College, Sandhurst, Laurie was commissioned into the Seaforth Highlanders in February 1912.

Serving in the First World War in France, he was awarded the Distinguished Service Order (DSO) in 1916, the citation for which reads:

For conspicuous gallantry in action. At a critical time he rallied men of various units who were without leaders, did fine work consolidating the position and helped to repel a bomb attack.

He was awarded a Bar to his DSO in 1919, when an acting lieutenant colonel commanding the 1/6th Battalion, Seaforth Highlanders. The citation for the Bar reads:

For conspicuous gallantry near Avesnes- le-Sec on the 15th October, 1918, when one of the companies under his command was driven back by heavy machine-gun and rifle fire, thus exposing a flank. He immediately went forward under heavy fire, reorganised the company in the open, and himself led them forward again to their position in the line. On 25th October, near Famars, he made a personal reconnaissance under heavy fire, reorganised the troops on their original front line, and so consolidated the position securely.

Between the wars, Laurie became commanding officer of the 2nd Battalion, Seaforth Highlanders in 1934, commanding officer of the British troops in the Tientsin area of China in 1939 and commander of the 157th Brigade in 1940. He was sent to France with the 52nd (Lowland) Division in June 1940, and was appointed a Commander of the Order of the British Empire for his services. Laurie was appointed General Officer Commanding of that division in March 1941 before becoming commandant of the Combined Operations Training Centre at Inveraray in 1942. He retired from the British Army as a major general in 1945.

Laurie held the honorary position of colonel of the Seaforth Highlanders from 1947 to 1957.

== Bibliography ==
- Fairrie, Angus (1983). "Cuidich'n Righ": A History of the Queen's Own Highlanders (Seaforth and Camerons). Regimental HQ, Queen's Own Highlanders.
- Smart, Nick (2005). Biographical Dictionary of British Generals of the Second World War. Barnesley: Pen & Sword. ISBN 1844150496.

Baronetage of the United Kingdom
Preceded by Wilfrid Laurie	Baronet (of Bedford Square); 1936–1983	Succeeded by Robert Laurie
Military offices
Preceded by James Drew	GOC 52nd (Lowland) Infantry Division; 1941–1942	Succeeded by Neil Ritchie
Honorary titles
Preceded by William Montgomerie Thomson	Colonel of the Seaforth Highlanders; 1947–1957	Succeeded by Sir James Cassels
