= Combined Operations Training Centre =

Military installation in Scotland

- Inveraray
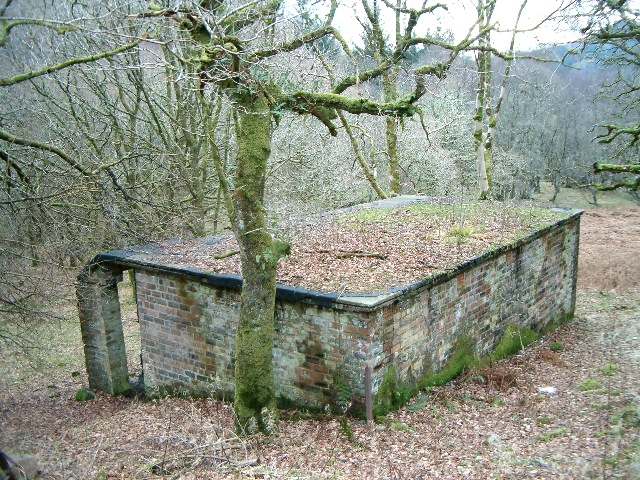
- One of the few remaining buildings at the Combined Operations Training Centre

Site information
- Type: Training Centre
- Owner: Ministry of Defence
- Operator: British Army

Location
- Location within Argyll and Bute
- Coordinates: 56.202°N 5.109°W

Site history
- Built: 1940
- Built for: War Office
- In use: 1940-1946

The Combined Operations Training Centre, also known as No.1 Combined Training Centre, Inveraray was a military installation on the banks of Loch Fyne near Inveraray in Scotland.

== History ==
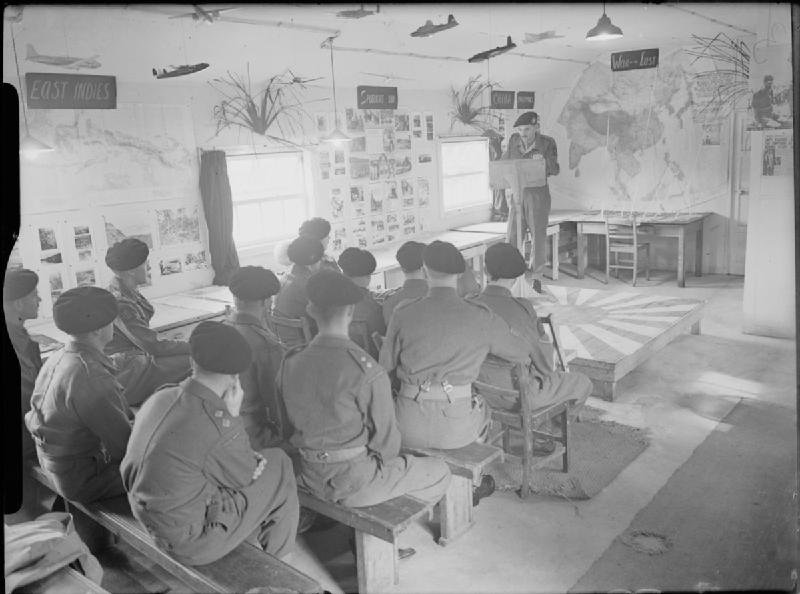
A lecture at HMS Quebec in Inverary

The centre was established in October 1940.

Each of the services had a presence at the centre, the army in the form of training staff specialising in the military engineering required for amphibious landings, the Navy in the form of HMS Quebec, a unit which trained staff in the use and maintenance of landing craft for such techniques and the air force in the form of RAF officers who could call on air support from No. 516 Squadron for training in such techniques.

Around a quarter of a million troops trained at the centre prior to the D-Day landings. Some 30 senior officers, each with a staff vehicle and radio also took part in a top secret deception exercise to convince the Germans that a major sea assault was being prepared but could not be launched until at least September 1944.

The centre closed in June 1946 and the site is now occupied by a caravan park.

== Commandants ==
Commandants were as follows:

- 1940–1942 Vice Admiral Theodore Hallett
- 1943–1945 Major-General Sir John Laurie
