= 52nd (Lowland) Infantry Division =

Lowland Division 52nd (Lowland) Division 52nd (Lowland) Infantry Division
- Shoulder badge of the 52nd (Lowland) Division during the Second World War
- Active: 1908 – 1919; 1920 – 1947; 1950 – 1968
- Country: United Kingdom
- Branch: Territorial Force
- Type: Infantry
- Role: Infantry, Air Landing, and Mountain
- Size: Second World War: 18,347 men (Note: This is the war establishment, the on-paper strength, of a British infantry division for 1944/1945.)
- Peacetime HQ: Glasgow, United Kingdom
- Engagements: First World War; Middle Eastern theatre; Battle of Romani; First Battle of Gaza; Second Battle of Gaza; Third Battle of Gaza; Second World War; Western Front; Battle of the Scheldt; Operation Blackcock; Invasion of Germany
- Battle honours: The Scheldt; The Rhineland; The Rhine

Commanders
- Notable commanders: Herbert Lawrence; Neil Ritchie; Edmund Hakewill-Smith

The 52nd (Lowland) Infantry Division was an infantry division of the British Army that was originally formed as the Lowland Division, in 1908 as part of the Territorial Force. It later became the 52nd (Lowland) Division in 1915. The 52nd (Lowland) Division fought in the First World War before being disbanded, with the rest of the Territorial Force, in 1920.

The Territorial Force was later reformed as the Territorial Army and the division was again raised, during the inter-war years, as the 52nd (Lowland) Infantry Division - a 1st Line Territorial Army Infantry Division - and went on to serve during the Second World War.

By December 1947, the formation amalgamated with 51st (Highland) Infantry Division to become 51st/52nd Scottish Division, but, by March 1950, 51st Division and 52nd Division had been recreated as separate formations. 52nd (Lowland) Division finally disbanded in 1968.

== History ==
=== Formation ===
The Territorial Force (TF) was formed on 1 April 1908 following the enactment of the Territorial and Reserve Forces Act 1907 (7 Edw.7, c.9) which combined and re-organised the old Volunteer Force, the Honourable Artillery Company and the Yeomanry. On formation, the TF contained 14 infantry divisions and 14 mounted yeomanry brigades. One of the divisions was the Lowland Division. In peacetime, the divisional headquarters was at 7 West George Street in Glasgow.

=== First World War ===
==== Operations ====
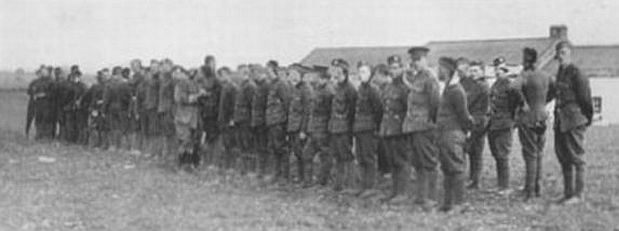
The roll call of the survivors of the 1st/7th Battalion, Royal Scots, after the accident, May 1915.

The famous territorial regiments that were incorporated in the division were all drawn from the Scottish Lowlands, and have a history that in some cases goes back more than 300 years. It consisted of three infantry brigades, the 155th (South Scottish) Brigade, 156th (Scottish Rifles) Brigade, and 157th (Highland Light Infantry) Brigades. Initially assigned to the defence of the Scottish coast, the division moved to Gallipoli (without two of its artillery brigades), arriving there in early July 1915. While moving from Scotland the division suffered the loss of 210 officers and men killed, and another 224 injured in the Quintinshill rail disaster, near Gretna, that involved the 1/7th Royal Scots.

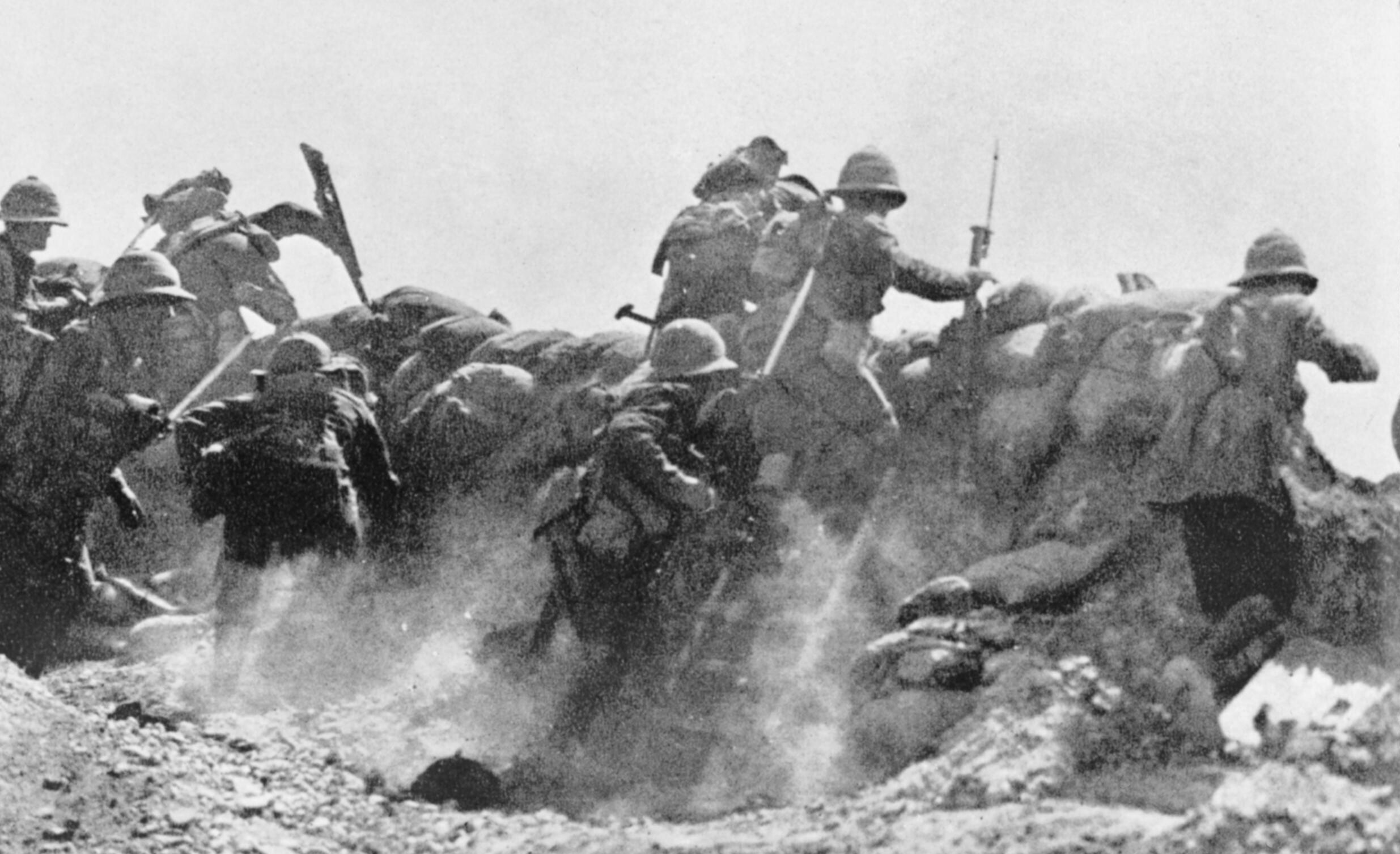
Men of the King's Own Scottish Borderers at Krithia, 4 June 1915.

During the First World War, the division first saw action at Gallipoli. The division, under the command of Major General Granville Egerton since March 1914, began landing at the Helles front, on the Gallipoli peninsula, in June 1915 as part of VIII Corps. The 156th Brigade was landed in time to take part in the Battle of Gully Ravine, where it was mauled, under the notorious Lieutenant-General Aylmer Hunter-Weston, commanding VIII Corps. Advancing along Fir Tree Spur, to the right of the ravine, the brigade had little artillery support and no experience of the Gallipoli battlefield. The brigade suffered heavy casualties.

When the remaining brigades were landed, they attacked towards Krithia, along Achi Baba Nullah, on 12 July. They succeeded in capturing the Ottoman trenches, but were left unsupported and vulnerable to counter-attack. For a modest gain in ground, they suffered 30 per cent casualties and were in no fit state to exploit their position.

The division, now under Major General Herbert Lawrence, was later evacuated from Gallipoli and moved to Egypt as part of the Egyptian Expeditionary Force, where it manned the east-facing defensive fortifications during the Battle of Romani. On the first, and most crucial day, of the battle the division was heavily engaged with the enemy's right flank, while the Australian Light Horse, New Zealand Mounted Rifles, and 5th Mounted Brigades fought the centre and left flank in extended order. With insufficient water, the mid-summer conditions proved too much for the infantry ordered to advance the following day and were not heavily involved in the fighting thereafter. Following the battle, they advanced across the Sinai occupying Bir el Abd, El Mazar and El Arish, but remained in a supporting role.

The division fought in the First and Second Battle of Gaza in March and April 1917.

As a division of XXI Corps, it played an important part in the final overthrow of the Ottomans at the Third Battle of Gaza and the subsequent advance. The division then participated in the Battle of Jerusalem. The Battle of Jaffa saw the passage of the Nahr El Auja, on the night of 20–21 December 1917, by the division's three infantry brigades, which according to General Sir Edmund Allenby's despatch "reflects great credit on the 52nd (Lowland) Division. It involved considerable preparation, the details of which were thought out with care and precision. The sodden state of the ground, and, on the night of the crossing, the swollen state of the river, added to the difficulties, yet by dawn the whole of the infantry had crossed. The fact that the enemy were taken by surprise, and, that all resistance was overcome with the bayonet without a shot being fired, bears testimony to the discipline of this division. The operation, by increasing the distance between the enemy and Jaffa from three to eight miles, "rendered Jaffa and its harbour secure, and gained elbow-room for the troops covering Ludd and Ramleh and the main Jaffa-Jerusalem road."

In April 1918, the division moved to France where it fought in the Second Battle of the Somme, the Second Battle of Arras, and the Battle of the Hindenburg Line during the Hundred Days Offensive.

After the war, the division was disbanded along with the rest of the TF. However, it was re-established in 1920 as part of the Territorial Army.

=== Second World War ===
==== Operations ====
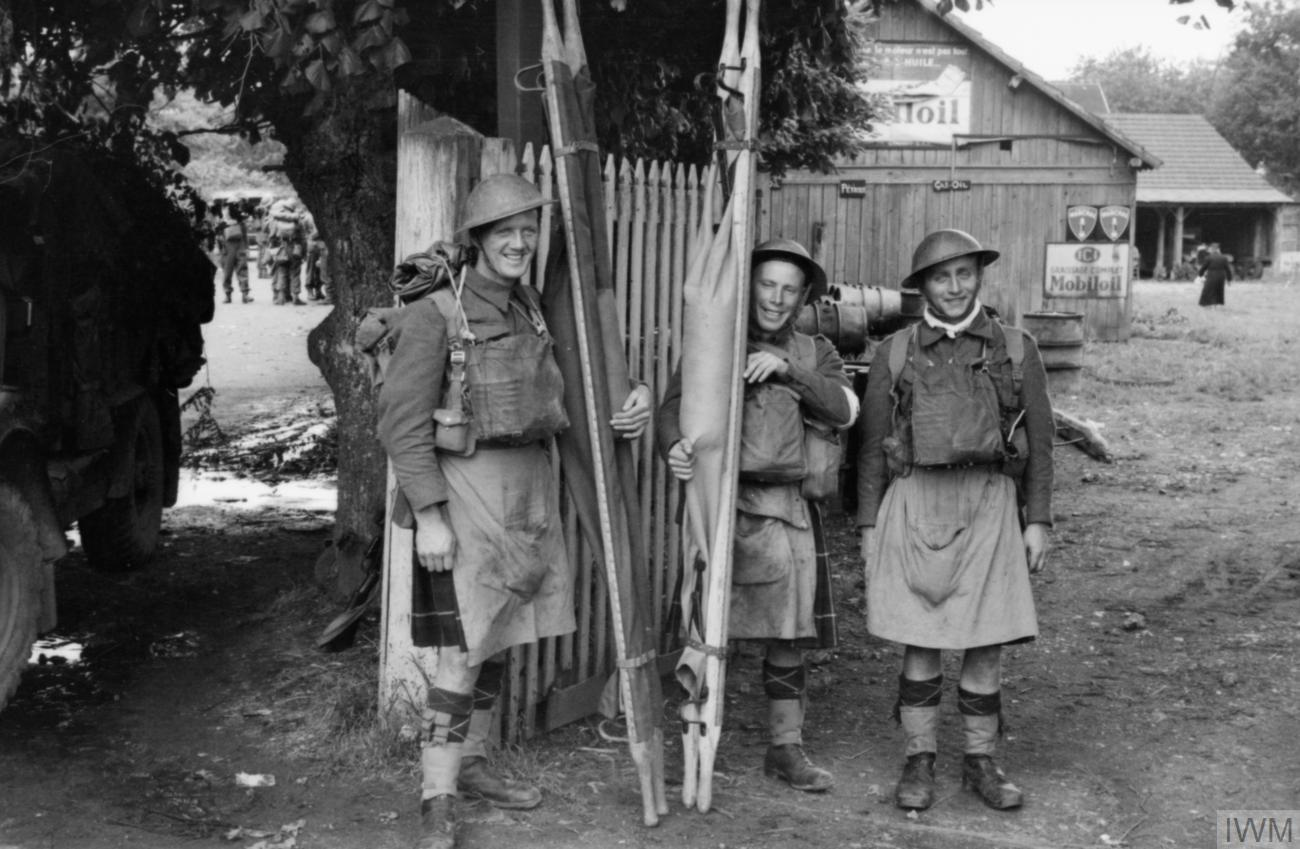
Stretcher bearers of the 1st Battalion, Glasgow Highlanders in France, 13 June 1940.

The 52nd (Lowland) Division, which had seen numerous changes in composition during the interwar period, was mobilised, along with the rest of the Territorial Army (previously the Territorial Force, reformed in 1920 and soon renamed the TA), in late August 1939, due to the worsening situation in Europe at the time. The Second World War began on 3 September 1939, after both Britain and France declared war on Germany after the latter's invasion of Poland and the 52nd, based in Scotland under the command of Major-General James S. Drew, was serving in Scottish Command, alongside its second line duplicate unit, the 15th (Scottish) Infantry Division.

The division was briefly deployed to France, following the Dunkirk evacuation, as part of the Second British Expeditionary Force (2BEF) to cover the withdrawal of Allied forces near Cherbourg during Operation Aerial. The division returned to the United Kingdom and, like most of the rest of the British Army after Dunkirk, began training to repel an expected German invasion, which never occurred. From May 1942 until June 1944, the 52nd was trained in a mountain warfare capacity, originally for a proposed invasion of Norway. However, the division was never employed in this role. Following June 1944, the 52nd Division was reorganised and trained in airlanding operations. As part of this new role, the division was transferred to the First Allied Airborne Army. By this time, the 52nd Division was under the command of Major-General Edmund Hakewill-Smith.

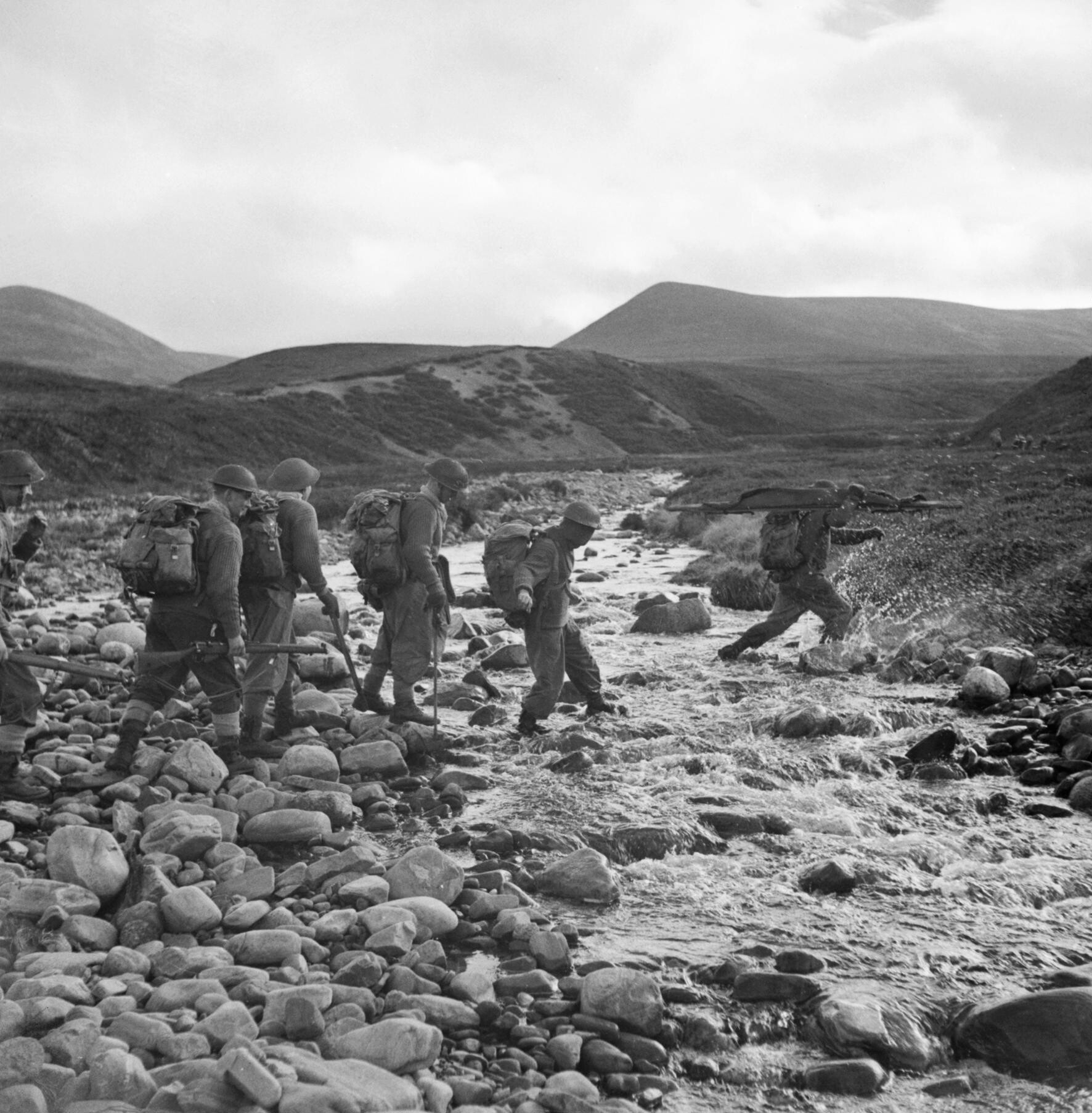
Men of the 5th Battalion, Highland Light Infantry training in the mountains near Inverness, Scotland, 22 October 1942.

Several operations were planned for the division, following the successful conclusion of the Normandy Campaign. Operation Transfigure planned to have the British 1st and American 101st Airborne Divisions capture landing strips near Rambouillet, for the 52nd Division to land at. The three divisions would have then blocked the German line of retreat towards Paris. Operation Linnet proposed using most of the First Allied Airborne Army, including the 52nd Division, to seize areas in north-eastern France to block the German line of retreat. As part of Operation Market Garden, the British 1st Airborne Division was given a subsidiary mission of capturing Deelen airfield, on which the 52nd Division would land. Due to the disastrous course of events that unfolded during the Battle of Arnhem, where the 1st Airborne Division was virtually destroyed and lost almost 8,000 men, the 52nd Division was not deployed.

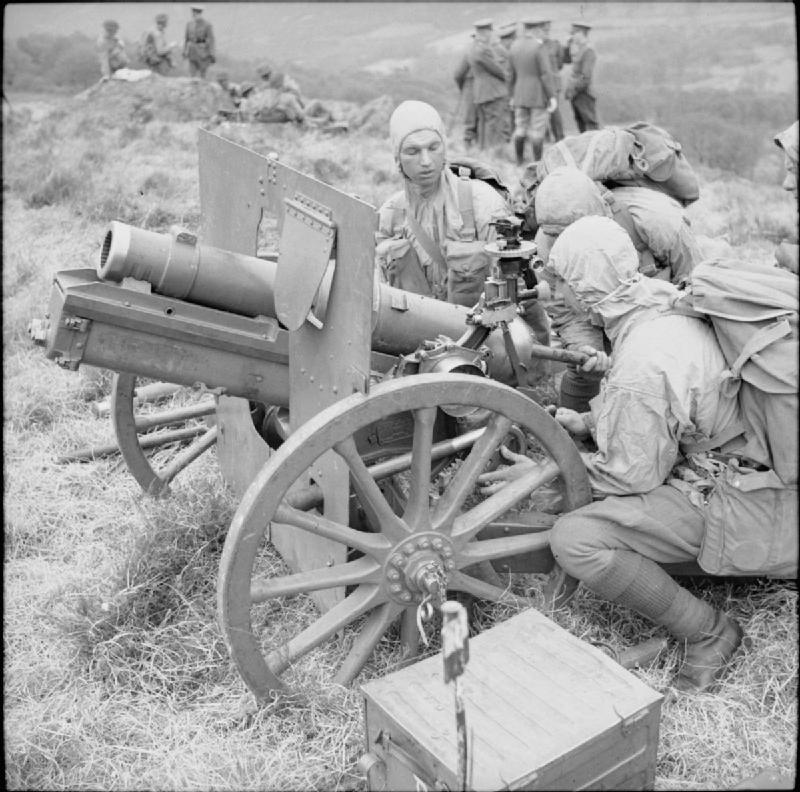
A 3.7-inch mountain howitzer of the 1st Mountain Artillery Regiment, Royal Artillery, attached to 52nd Division, on exercise at Trawsfynydd in Wales, sometime in 1942. The gun crew are wearing weatherproof anoraks, mountaineering breeches and woollen stockings.

The division would never be used in either of the roles it had trained for, and was transferred to Belgium via sea landing in Ostend. The 157th Infantry Brigade landed first at the end of the first week of October and the rest of the division arrived over the course of the following fortnight. On 15 October, the 157th Brigade was, temporarily, attached to the 3rd Canadian Infantry Division and relieved the Canadian units in the bridgehead over the Leopold Canal. At first the Scots of 52nd Division and the Canadians did not see eye to eye, with a cultural clash of untidy and 'undisciplined' Canadians against 'spit and polish' Scots. On taking over some Canadian positions in mid-October, Scottish officers commented: "No one in Scotland would ask a pig to lie in the houses (recently vacated by the Canadians) on the south side of the canal." However, both sides soon came to recognise that high fighting capability could be engendered in both approaches.

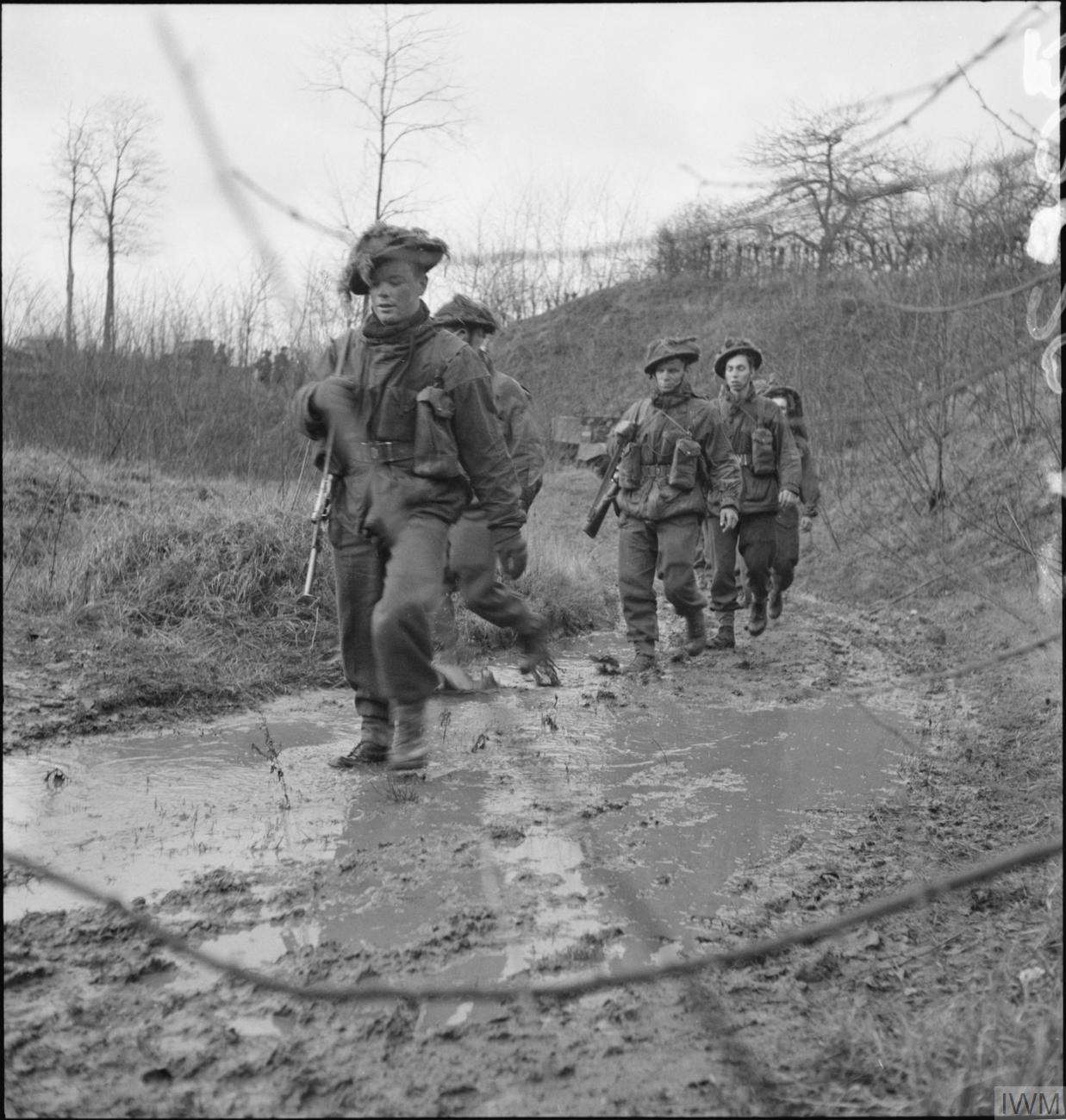
Men of 'C' Company of the 4th Battalion, King's Own Scottish Borderers, move up to attack a pillbox, the Netherlands, 11 December 1944.

From 23 October until December, the 52nd (Lowland) Division was assigned to the First Canadian Army, serving first under II Canadian Corps and then the British I Corps. The division's first operation would be to aid in opening the vital Belgian port of Antwerp, in the Battle of the Scheldt. Ironically, the first operation of the division would not be in mountainous terrain or being deployed by air, but fighting below sea level on the flooded polders around the Scheldt Estuary of Belgium and the Netherlands. Operation Vitality and Operation Infatuate were aimed at capturing South Beveland and the island of Walcheren to open the mouth of the Scheldt Estuary. This would enable the Allies to use the port of Antwerp as a supply entrepôt for the troops in North-West Europe. It was in this vital operation that the 52nd Division was to fight its first battle with brilliant success that earned them high praise. During the battle, the division was given command "of all the military operations" on Walcheren. This included command of the 4th Commando Brigade, after it had landed on the island, and No. 4 Commando during the assault on Flushing. Following the battle the division remained on Walcheren until November, when it was relieved by the 4th Canadian Armoured Division.

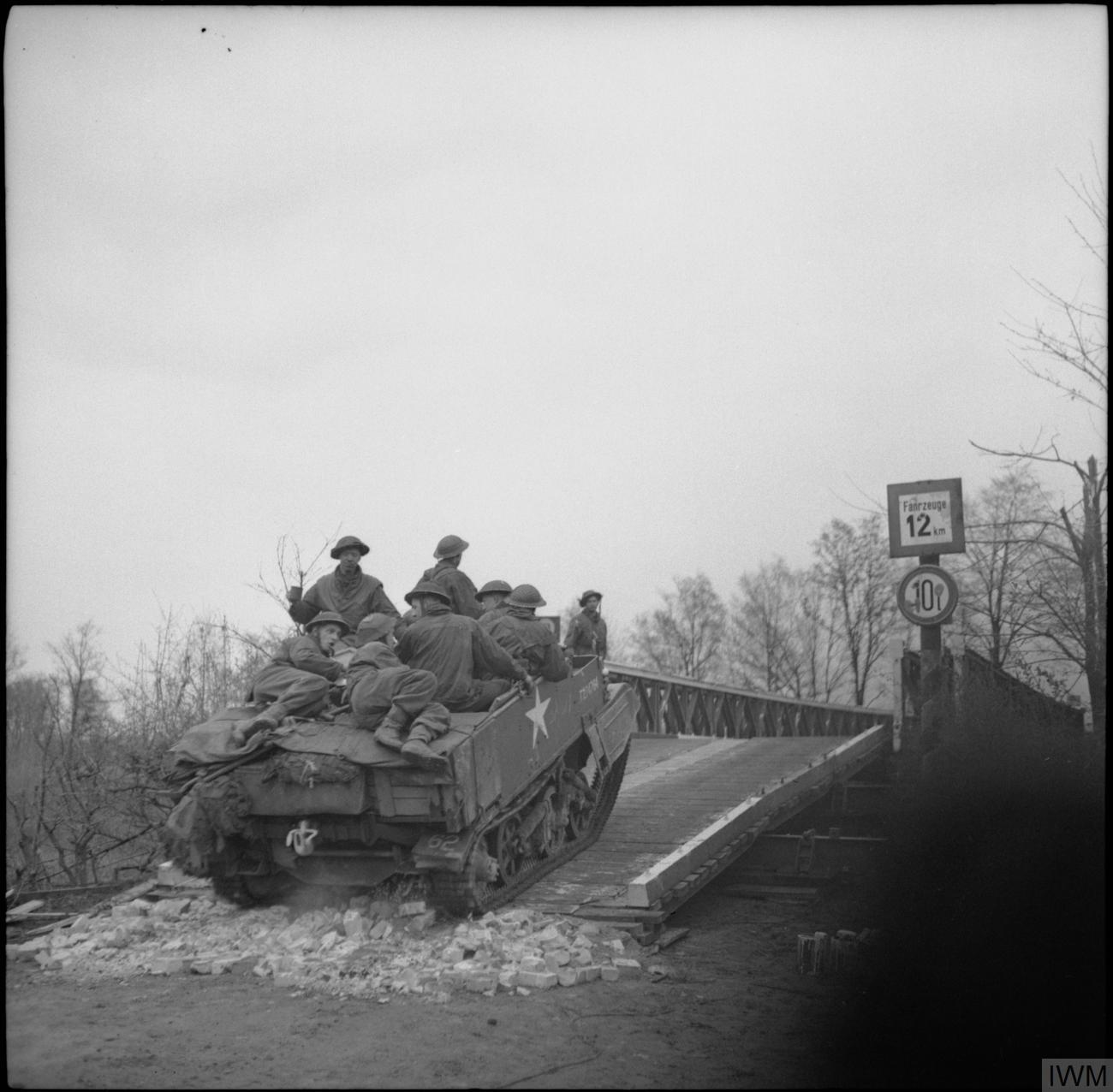
A Universal Carrier of the 6th Battalion, Cameronians (Scottish Rifles) crossing the Dortmund–Ems Canal, Germany, 4 April 1945.

On 5 December, the division was transferred to XXX Corps of the British Second Army. During the month, the 157th Infantry Brigade was temporarily attached to the 43rd (Wessex) Infantry Division for several days. In January 1945, the 52nd Division, now serving under XII Corps, participated in Operation Blackcock, the clearing of the Roer Triangle between the rivers Meuse and Roer. During the operation, 19-year-old Fusilier Dennis Donnini of the 4th/5th Battalion, Royal Scots Fusiliers was posthumously awarded the Victoria Cross. During the operation, the 155th Infantry Brigade was attached to the 7th Armoured Division.

In February and March, the division was slightly reorganised with battalions being transferred amongst the division's brigades. Peter White, a second lieutenant within the 4th Battalion, King's Own Scottish Borderers, describes this change due to 21st Army Group commander Field Marshal Bernard Montgomery's "aversion to two Battalions of the same Regiment" being in the same brigade as it could result "in one home district or town having disproportionate losses after any sticky action". For most of April, the 155th Infantry Brigade was again attached to the 7th Armoured Division "to drive for the Elbe across Lüneburg Heath". The division (minus the 155th Brigade) took part in the Western Allied invasion of Germany, with its last major action being the Battle of Hamburg, where it ended the war.

=== Post Second World War ===
During 1946, the First Canadian Army was withdrawn from Germany and disbanded. As it withdrew from Germany, it "turned over its responsibilities" to the 52nd Division. After its postwar demobilisation, the TA was reformed in 1947. The division was amalgamated with the 51st (Highland) Infantry Division to form the 51st/52nd Scottish Division, while the surplus Lowland artillery regiments formed a separate 85 (Field) Army Group Royal Artillery (Lowland) in Scottish Command on 1 January 1947. In 1950, the 51st/52nd (Scottish) Division was split, restoring the independence of the 52nd Lowland Division, which took regional command of Territorial Army units based in the Scottish Lowlands, including the Territorial infantry battalions of the Lowland Brigade regiments. On 1 July 1950 85 AGRA was once more designated as HQ RA 52 (Lowland) Division. In 1967, 52nd Lowland Division was reduced to brigade strength: two brigade-level districts were established in the Highlands and Lowlands, with the Lowland District Headquarters commanded by Major General Sir Francis James Cecil Bowes-Lyon in Hamilton, near Glasgow.

== General officer commanding ==
Appointed	General officer commanding
April 1908	Brigadier-General Henry R. Kelham
March 1910	Major-General James Spens
21 March 1914	Major-General Granville G. A. Egerton
17 September 1915	Major-General The Honourable Herbert A. Lawrence
27 June 1916	Brigadier-General H. G. Casson (acting)
11 July 1916	Major-General Wilfrid E. B. Smith
11 September 1917	Major General John Hill
23 September 1918	Major-General Francis J. Marshall
June 1919	Major-General Sir Philip R. Robertson
June 1923	Major-General Hamilton L. Reed
June 1927	Major-General Sir Henry F. Thuillier
March 1930	Major-General Sir Walter J Constable-Maxwell-Scott
March 1934	Major-General Andrew J. McCulloch
September 1935	Major-General Victor Fortune
August 1936	Major-General Sir Andrew J. McCulloch
March 1938	Major-General James S. Drew
29 March 1941	Major-General Sir John E. Laurie
1 September 1942	Brigadier G. P. Miller (acting)
11 September 1942	Major-General Neil M. Ritchie
11 November 1943	Brigadier Edmund Hakewill-Smith (acting)
19 November 1943	Major-General Edmund Hakewill-Smith
1946	Major-General Edmund Hakewill-Smith (GOC Lowland District)
December 1948	Major-General Robert E. Urquhart
February 1950	Major-General George H. Inglis
1952	Major-General R. George Collingwood
October 1955	Major-General Rohan Delacombe
October 1958	Major-General John F.M. Macdonald
October 1961	Major-General John D. Frost
February 1964	Major-General Henry L. E. C. Leask
May 1966 – 1968	Major-General Sir F. James Bowes-Lyon

== Orders of battle ==
=== First World War ===
52nd (Lowland) Division (1914–1918)

155th (South Scottish) Brigade

- 1/4th Battalion, Royal Scots Fusiliers
- 1/5th Battalion, Royal Scots Fusiliers
- 1/4th (The Border) Battalion, King's Own Scottish Borderers
- 1/5th (Dumfries and Galloway) Battalion, King's Own Scottish Borderers (left 28 June 1918)
- 155th Machine Gun Company, Machine Gun Corps (formed 23 March 1916, moved to 52nd Battalion, Machine Gun Corps 28 April 1918)
- 155th Trench Mortar Battery (formed 24 May 1917)

156th (Scottish Rifles) Brigade

- 1/5th Battalion, Cameronians (Scottish Rifles) (left November 1914)
- 1/6th Battalion, Cameronians (Scottish Rifles) (left March 1915)
- 1/7th Battalion, Cameronians (Scottish Rifles)
- 1/8th Battalion, Cameronians (Scottish Rifles) (left 28 June 1918)
- 1/4th (Queen's Edinburgh Rifles) Battalion, Royal Scots (Lothian Regiment) (from April 1915)
- 1/7th Battalion, Royal Scots (Lothian Regiment) (from April 1915)
- 156th Machine Gun Company, Machine Gun Corps (formed 16 March 1916, moved to 52nd Battalion, Machine Gun Corps 28 April 1918)
- 156th Trench Mortar Battery (formed 27 June 1917)

157th (Highland Light Infantry) Brigade

- 1/5th (City of Glasgow) Battalion, Highland Light Infantry
- 1/6th (City of Glasgow) Battalion, Highland Light Infantry
- 1/7th (Blythswood) Battalion, Highland Light Infantry
- 1/9th (Glasgow Highlanders) Battalion, Highland Light Infantry (left November 1914)
- 1/5th (Renfrewshire) Battalion, Princess Louise's (Argyll and Sutherland Highlanders) (from April 1915 to 28 June 1918)
- 157th Machine Gun Company, Machine Gun Corps (formed 14 March 1916, moved to 52nd Battalion, Machine Gun Corps 28 April 1918)
- 157th Trench Mortar Battery (formed 11 June 1917)

Lowland Mounted Brigade (Landed at Helles 11 October 1915 and reinforced the division. Left 31 December 1915)

- 1/1st Ayrshire Yeomanry
- 1/1st Lanarkshire Yeomanry

1st Dismounted Brigade (attached to 52nd Division 5 February; disbanded 16 October 1916)

- 1/1st Ayrshire Yeomanry
- 1/1st Lanarkshire Yeomanry
- 1/1st Scottish Horse
- 1/2nd Scottish Horse
- 1/3rd Scottish Horse
- 1st Dismounted Brigade Signal Section, Royal Engineers
- 1st Dismounted Brigade Machine Gun Company
- 1/1st Lowland Mounted Brigade Field Ambulance, Royal Army Medical Corps
- 1/1st Scottish Horse Field Ambulance, RAMC

Divisional Mounted Troops

- 52nd (Lowland) Divisional Cyclist Company (Note: formed during war training, broken up as reinforcements 1 August 1915; reformed 27 March 1916, left 8 December 1917; rejoined 1 April 1918; broken up for drafts 4 May 1918)
- Royal Glasgow Yeomanry (HQ and C Squadron joined 10 October 1915; left 21 August 1917)
- 4th Queen's Own Hussars (One Troop attached from 30 October 1918)
- VIII Corps Cyclist Battalion (Detachment attached from 30 October 1918)

52nd (Lowland) Divisional Artillery

- Royal Field Artillery
  - I Lowland Brigade (remained in Scotland when division embarked for Egypt)
    - 1st City of Edinburgh Battery
    - 2nd City of Edinburgh Battery
    - Midlothian Battery
    - I Lowland Brigade Ammunition Column
  - II Lowland Brigade (remained in Egypt when division embarked for Gallipoli; rejoined 5–6 March 1916; renamed CCLX (260) Bde and batteries became A–C 28 May 1916; renumbered CCLXI (261) Bde 15 September 1916; to 7th (Meerut) Division 3 April 1918)
    - 1st Ayrshire Battery
    - 2nd Ayrshire Battery
    - Kirkcudbrightshire Battery (broken up between A and B Btys 25 December 1916)
    - C (H) Battery (joined from CCLXIII (H) Bde 30 December 1916)
    - II Lowland Brigade Ammunition Column (joined 52nd Divisional Ammunition Column 1 January 1917)
  - III Lowland Brigade, RFA (remained in Scotland when division embarked for Egypt; rejoined 17 March 1916; renamed CCLXI (261) Bde and batteries became A–C 28 May 1916; renumbered CCLXII (262) Bde 15 September 1916; to 7th (Meerut) Division 3 April 1918)
    - 1st City of Glasgow Battery
    - 2nd City of Glasgow Battery
    - 3rd City of Glasgow Battery (broken up between A and B Btys 25 December 1916)
    - C (H) Battery (joined from CCLXIII (H) Bde 30 December 1916; became B (H)/CCLXIV Bde 1 July 1917)
    - III Lowland Brigade Ammunition Column (joined 52nd Divisional Ammunition Column 1 January 1917)
  - IV Lowland (Howitzer) Brigade (detached to ANZAC Cove; rejoined 11 January 1916; renamed CCLXII (262) Bde and batteries became A & B 28 May 1916; renumbered CCLXIII (263) Bde 15 September 1916; broken up 30 December 1916)
    - 5th City of Glasgow (H) Battery (became C (H)/CCLXI Bty 30 December 1916)
    - 6th City of Glasgow (H) Battery (became C (H)/CCLXII Bty 30 December 1916)
    - IV Lowland (H) Brigade Ammunition Column (joined 52nd Divisional Ammunition Column 1 January 1917)
  - CCLXIV Brigade (formed 1 July 1917; to 7th (Meerut) Division 3 April 1918)
    - A Bty (joined from CCLXXII Bde)
    - B (H) Bty (joined from CCLXII Bde)
  - IX Brigade (joined from 7th (Meerut) Division 1 April 1918)
    - 19, 20, 28 Btys
    - D (H)/LXIX Bty (originally from 13th (Western) Division)
  - LVI Brigade (joined from 7th (Meerut) Division 1 April 1918 (originally from 13th (Western) Division))
    - A, B, C Btys
    - 527 (H) Bty
  - 52nd Pom-Pom Battery (June 1917)
- Royal Horse Artillery
  - V Lowland Brigade (joined 17 March 1916; renamed CCLXIII (263) Bde and batteries became A–C 28 May 1916; renumbered CCLXIV (264) Bde 15 September 1916; reverted to CCLXIII 30 December 1916; to Yeomanry Mounted Division 5 July 1917)
    - Hampshire Royal Horse Artillery
    - Essex Royal Horse Artillery
    - West Riding Royal Horse Artillery (broken up between A and B Btys 25 December 1916)
- Heavy Artillery
- Lowland (Edinburgh) Heavy Battery and Ammunition Column, Royal Garrison Artillery (remained in Scotland when division embarked for Gallipoli)
- Trench Mortars
- X/52, Y/52, Z/52 Medium Trench Mortar Batteries (joined 3 October 1917; to 7th (Meerut) Division 3 April 1918)
- 133, 134 Medium Trench Mortar Batteries (joined from 7th (Meerut) Division 3 April 1918; became X/52 and Y/52 1 May 1918)
- 52nd Divisional Ammunition Column (remained in Egypt when division embarked for Gallipoli, broken up 17 March 1916; reformed from Brigade Ammunition Columns 1 January 1917; exchanged with 7th (Meerut) Division DAC 3 April 1918)

Royal Engineers

- 1/1st Lowland Field Company (embarked for France 15 December 1914 and joined 1st Division)
- 1/2nd Lowland Field Company (joined 29th Division March 1915; returned to 52nd Division 24 February 1916; later numbered 410 Field Company)
- 3rd Kent Field Company (joined 20 November 1915; to 29th Division 26 February 1916)
- 2/1st Lowland Field Company (raised after outbreak of war; later numbered 412 Field Company)
- 2/2nd Lowland Field Company (raised after outbreak of war; later numbered 413 Field Company)
- Lowland Divisional Signal Company
  - No 1 Section
  - No 2 (Scottish Rifles) Section
  - No 3 (Highland Light Infantry) Section
  - No 4 (South Scottish) Section

Pioneers

- 5th Battalion, Royal Irish Regiment (joined from 10th (Irish) Division 3 April 1918, left 31 May 1918)'
- 17th Battalion, Northumberland Fusiliers (former railway pioneer battalion joined 31 May 1918)

Machine Gun Corps

- No 52 Battalion (formed 28 April 1918)
  - 155th MG Company (from 155th Brigade)
  - 156th MG Company (from 155th Brigade)
  - 157th MG Company (from 155th Brigade)
  - 211th MG Company (from XXI Corps 1 April 1918)

Royal Army Medical Corps

- 1st Lowland Field Ambulance
- 2nd Lowland Field Ambulance
- 3rd Lowland Field Ambulance
- Lowland Clearing Hospital
- 52nd Sanitary Section (left Glasgow 3 June 1915, joined 27 July 1915; to 10th (Irish) Division early October 1915, rejoined 22 October 1917; left 4 May 1918)
- 18th Sanitary Section (joined October 1915, to 10th (Irish) Division 24 October 1917)

Divisional Train, Army Service Corps

- 1/1st Lowland Divisional Transport and Supply Column (became 52nd Divisional Train; to 10th (Irish) Division October 1915)
  - 1st (HQ) Company (became 475 Company)
  - 2nd Company (became 476 Company)
  - 3rd (Scottish Rifle Brigade) Company (became 477 Company)
  - 4th (Highland Light Infantry Brigade) Company (became 478 Company)
  - Lothian Brigade Company (independent of division)
  - Lowland Mounted Brigade Company (independent of division)
- 31st Divisional Train (joined and retitled 52nd Divisional Train March 1916)
  - 217, 218, 219, 220 (Horse Transport) Companies
  - 1076 (Motor Transport) Company (formed in UK April 1918, joined in France; later to GHQ Reserve)
  - 52nd Divisional Ambulance Workshop (previously 31st Divisional Ambulance Workshop, joined by 21 April 1916; absorbed in Divisional Supply Column June 1917)

Others

- 1st Lowland Mobile Veterinary Section, Army Veterinary Corps
- 984th Divisional Employment Company (formed by 27 April 1918)

=== Second World War ===
52nd (Lowland) Infantry Division (1939–1945)
- 155th Infantry Brigade
  - 7th/9th Battalion, Royal Scots
  - 4th Battalion, King's Own Scottish Borderers
  - 5th Battalion, King's Own Scottish Borderers (left 12 February 1945)
  - 155th Infantry Brigade Anti-Tank Company (formed 12 May 1940, disbanded 7 January 1941)
  - 6th Battalion, Highland Light Infantry (from 12 February 1945)
  156th Infantry Brigade
  - 4th/5th Battalion, Royal Scots Fusiliers
  - 6th Battalion, Cameronians (Scottish Rifles)
  - 7th Battalion, Cameronians (Scottish Rifles) (left 13 March 1945)
  - 156th Infantry Brigade Anti-Tank Company (formed 5 December 1939, disbanded 7 January 1941)
  - 1st Battalion, Glasgow Highlanders (from 14 March 1945)
  157th Infantry Brigade
  - 1st Battalion, Glasgow Highlanders (left 12 March 1945)
  - 5th Battalion, Highland Light Infantry
  - 6th Battalion, Highland Light Infantry (left 12 February 1945)
  - 157th Infantry Brigade Anti-Tank Company (formed 12 May 1940, disbanded 7 January 1941)
  - 5th Battalion, King's Own Scottish Borderers (from 12 February 1945)
  - 7th Battalion, Cameronians (Scottish Rifles) (from 14 March 1945)
  Divisional troops
  - 52nd Divisional artillery, Royal Artillery
    - 78th (Lowland) Field Regiment, Royal Artillery (left 3 June 1942)
    - 79th (Lowland) Field Regiment, Royal Artillery (until 8 June, rejoined 1 July 1940)
    - 80th (Lowland – City of Glasgow) Field Regiment, Royal Artillery (until 8 June, rejoined 1 July 1940)
    - 186th Field Regiment, Royal Artillery (from 27 December 1942)
    - 1st Mountain Regiment, Royal Artillery (from 6 July 1942 until 21 March 1945)
    - 54th (Queen's Own Royal Glasgow Yeomanry) Anti-Tank Regiment, Royal Artillery
    - 108th Light Anti-Aircraft Regiment, Royal Artillery (from 12 March 1942)
  - 52nd Divisional engineers, Royal Engineers
    - 240th (Lowland) Field Company (left 20 September 1939)
    - 241st (Lowland) Field Company
    - 242nd (Lowland) Field Company (left 19 October 1939; later joined IX Corps Troops RE)
    - 554th Field Company (from 7 December 1939)
    - 202nd (East Lancashire) Field Company (from 42nd Divisional Engineers 7 June 1940)
    - 243rd (Lowland) Field Park Company, Royal Engineers
    - 17th Bridging Platoon (from 1 October 1943)
    - 52nd (Lowland) Division Postal Unit, Royal Engineers
  - 52nd Divisional Signals, Royal Corps of Signals
  - 1/9th Battalion, Manchester Regiment (Machine Gun Battalion, from 11 November 1941 until 4 May 1942)
  - 7th Battalion, Manchester Regiment (from 7 June 1943, became Machine Gun Battalion 19 March 1944)
  - 52nd (Lowland) Reconnaissance Regiment, Reconnaissance Corps (Note: formed 8 January 1941 as 52nd Battalion, Reconnaissance Corps, became 52nd Reconnaissance Regiment 6 June 1942, part of the Royal Armoured Corps 1 January 1944)

=== Cold War ===
51st/52nd Infantry Division (Cold War)
- 153 (Highland) Brigade
  - 11th Battalion, Seaforth Highlanders, Golspie
  - 4/5th Battalion, Queen's Own Cameron Highlanders, Inverness
  - Lovat Scouts, Beauly
  - 4/7th Battalion, Gordon Highlanders, Aberdeen,
  - 5/6 Battalion, Gordon Highlanders, Bucksburn
  154 (Highland) Brigade
  - 7th Battalion, Argyll and Sutherland Highlanders, Stirling
  - 8th Battalion, Argyll and Sutherland Highlanders, Dunoon
  157 (Lowland) Brigade
  - 4/5th Bn Royal Scots Fusiliers, Ayr
  - 6th Battalion, Cameronians (Scottish Rifles), Glasgow
  - 7th Battalion, Cameronians (Scottish Rifles), Glasgow
  - 5/6th Battalion, Highland Light Infantry, Glasgow
  - Glasgow Highlanders at Glasgow
  Divisional troops
  - 51st/52nd Divisional artillery, Royal Artillery
    - 254th (West Highland) Anti-Tank Regiment, Dumbarton
    - 275th (Highland) Field Regiment, Aberdeen
    - 277th (Highland) Field Regiment, Greenock
    - 278th (Lowland) Field Regiment (The City of Edinburgh Artillery), Edinburgh
    - 532th Light Anti-Aircraft Regiment, Falkirk
    - 886th Locating Battery, Perth
  - 117th Engineer Regiment, Aberdeen
  - 51st/52nd Divisional Signal Regiment, Royal Corps of Signals, Aberdeen
  - 51/52 Ordnance Field Park
  - 51st/52nd Divisional Royal Electrical and Mechanical Engineers
  - 51st/52nd Divisional Royal Army Medical Corps.
  - Scottish Horse, Dunkeld
52nd Infantry Division (Cold War, incomplete)
  - 85 (Field) Army Group Royal Artillery (Lowland)
    - HQ, Townhead, Glasgow
    - 279 (Lowland) Field Regiment, Ayr
    - 280 (Lowland – City of Glasgow) Medium Regiment, Glasgow
    - 330 (Lowland) Medium Regiment, Troon
    - 357 (Lothians) Medium Regiment, Edinburgh

== See also ==
- List of British divisions in World War I
- List of British divisions in World War II
- British Army Order of Battle (September 1939)
- Independent Company

== Notes ==
Footnotes

Citations
