= Edmund Hakewill-Smith =

British Army general (1896–1986)

Major-General Sir Edmund Hakewill-Smith KCVO CB CBE MC
- Born: 17 March 1896; Kimberley, Northern Cape, South Africa
- Died: 15 April 1986 (aged 90); Kingston upon Thames, Surrey, England
- Military career
- Allegiance: United Kingdom
- Branch: British Army
- Service years: 1915–1949
- Rank: Major-General
- Service number: 13379
- Unit: Royal Scots Fusiliers
- Commands: Lowland District (1946–1948); 52nd (Lowland) Infantry Division (1943–1946); 155th Infantry Brigade (1943); 157th Infantry Brigade (1941–1942); 4th/5th Battalion, Royal Scots Fusiliers (1940–1941); 5th Battalion, Devonshire Regiment (1940)
- Conflicts: First World War; Russian Civil War; Second World War
- Awards: Knight Commander of the Royal Victorian Order; Companion of the Order of the Bath; Commander of the Order of the British Empire; Military Cross; Mentioned in Despatches (2); Commander with Star of the Royal Order of St. Olav (Norway); Grand Officer in the Order of Orange-Nassau (Netherlands)

Major-General Sir Edmund Hakewill-Smith, KCVO, CB, CBE, MC (17 March 1896 – 15 April 1986) was a senior British Army officer who served in both the First and Second World Wars.

== Military career ==
Hakewill-Smith was born in Kimberley, Cape Colony, on 17 March 1896. He was educated at the Diocesan College ("Bishops") in Rondebosch, Cape Town, and, during the First World War, he went to England to attend the Royal Military College, Sandhurst, where he was commissioned as a second lieutenant into the Royal Scots Fusiliers, a line infantry regiment of the British Army, on 16 June 1915. He served with the 2nd (Regular) Battalion of his regiment on the Western Front, where he was wounded twice and, during the final Hundred Days Offensive in the latter half of 1918, was awarded the Military Cross. The citation for the award read:

For conspicuous gallantry and devotion to duty during the nine miles' advance east of Ypres on 28th, 29th and 30th September, 1918. On the 28th he successfully filled a gap in the front line at a critical moment. On the 29th, when he was the only platoon officer left in his company, he took command of two platoons, and showed admirable coolness and determination in dealing with machine-gun nests, which were holding up the company on his right.

After the war Hakewill-Smith remained in the army and served with the British Military Mission to South Russia in 1920. In 1921 he was aide-de-camp to Lawrence Dundas, 2nd Marquess of Zetland (Governor of Bengal, India). He later served as an adjutant to the 2nd Battalion, Royal Scots Fusiliers between 1927 and 1930, and was a student at the Staff College, Quetta from 1932 to 1933. He later served on the staff of the War Office from 1934 to 1936.

During the Second World War, Hakewill-Smith served as commanding officer (CO) of the 5th Battalion, Devonshire Regiment, for several months from May 1940 and, from September that year, as the CO of the 4th/5th Battalion, Royal Scots Fusiliers, as an acting lieutenant colonel. He was promoted to temporary brigadier on 30 March 1941, and commanded the 157th Infantry Brigade until late March 1942, when he was promoted to the acting rank of major-general. He then became director of organization at the War Office, before assuming command of the 155th Infantry Brigade in mid-February 1943. On 26 December, after his major-general's rank was made temporary, he assumed command of the mountain warfare-trained 52nd (Lowland) Infantry Division from Major General Neil Ritchie as its general officer commanding (GOC). He commanded the 52nd Division during the last few months of the campaign in North-West Europe from October 1944 until May 1945.

Hakewill-Smith was appointed a Commander of the Order of the British Empire in 1944 and a Companion of the Order of the Bath in 1945. He served as the Honorary Colonel of the Royal Scots Fusiliers from 1946 to 1957.

After the war, Hakewill-Smith commanded the Lowland District in Scotland before serving as President of the Military Court for War Crimes Trial of German Field Marshal Albert Kesselring. He retired from the army in 1949.

In addition, he served at Windsor Castle as a governor of the military knights of Windsor, taking over from Lieutenant General Sir Charles Kavanagh in March 1951, later being appointed Lieutenant Governor of the castle (1964–1972) and was created a Knight Commander of the Royal Victorian Order in 1967. He died in Kingston upon Thames, Surrey in 1986 at the age of 90.

== Bibliography ==
- Smart, Nick (2005). Biographical Dictionary of British Generals of the Second World War. Barnsley: Pen and Sword Books. ISBN 1844150496.

Military offices
Preceded by Neil Ritchie	GOC 52nd (Lowland) Infantry Division; GOC Lowland District from 1946; 1943–1948	Succeeded by Robert Urquhart
Honorary titles
Preceded by The Lord Trenchard	Colonel of the Royal Scots Fusiliers; 1946–1957	Succeeded by Archibald Buchanan-Dunlop
