= Francis Marshall (British Army officer) =

British Army officer

Major-General Francis Marshall CB CMG DSO
- Marshall in 1918
- Born: Francis James Marshall; 20 August 1876
- Died: 22 May 1942 (aged 65)
- Military career
- Branch: British Army
- Rank: Major-General
- Commands: 150th (York and Durham) Brigade; 52nd (Lowland) Infantry Division; 11th Infantry Brigade; 54th (East Anglian) Infantry Division
- Conflicts: First World War
- Awards: Companion of the Order of the Bath; Companion of the Order of St Michael and St George; Distinguished Service Order

Major-General Francis James Marshall CB CMG DSO (20 August 1876 – 22 May 1942) was a British Army officer.

== Military career ==
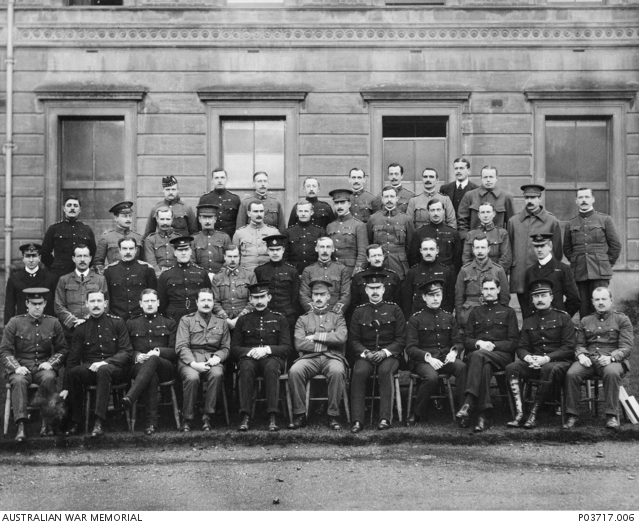
Group portrait of officers at the British Staff College at Camberley, England, 1906. Francis Marshall, then a captain, is in the third row, third on the left.

Marshall was commissioned into the Seaforth Highlanders on 28 September 1895. He was promoted on 3 November 1897 to lieutenant.

In February 1914 he was appointed as a deputy assistant adjutant general.

Promoted to temporary lieutenant colonel in April 1915, while serving as an assistant adjutant and quartermaster general (AA&QMG), In June 1916 he was made a brevet lieutenant colonel. He became commander of the 150th (York and Durham) Brigade in June 1918 and was general officer commanding 52nd (Lowland) Infantry Division in September 1918 on the Western Front during the First World War.

Marshall, promoted to brevet colonel on 1 January 1919, went on to be director of military training at the War Office in 1920, commander of the 11th Infantry Brigade in October 1923, and was promoted on 30 July 1929 to major general and relinquished his assignment of assistant director of the Territorial Army (TA) on 31 July.

He was GOC of the Territorial Army's 54th (East Anglian) Infantry Division in September 1930 before retiring from the army on 14 September 1934.

He was appointed a Companion of the Order of St Michael and St George in the 1918 New Year Honours.

Military offices
Preceded by John Hill	GOC 52nd (Lowland) Infantry Division; 1918–1919	Succeeded by Sir Philip Robertson
Preceded by Sir Torquhil Matheson	GOC 54th (East Anglian) Infantry Division; 1930–1934	Succeeded by Russell Luckock
