= 80th Brigade (United Kingdom) =

Formation in the British Army during World War I

The 80th Brigade was a formation of the British Army. It was originally formed from regular army battalions serving away from home in the British Empire. It was assigned to the 27th Division and served on the Western Front and the Macedonian Front during the First World War.

Brigadier-General Charles Granville Fortescue served as the first commander of this brigade.

== Units ==
The infantry battalions did not all serve at once, but all were assigned to the brigade during the war.

- 2nd Battalion, King's Shropshire Light Infantry
- 3rd Battalion, King's Royal Rifle Corps
- 4th Battalion, King's Royal Rifle Corps
- 4th Battalion, Rifle Brigade
- Princess Patricia's Canadian Light Infantry
- 80th Machine Gun Company
- 80th Trench Mortar Battery
- 80th SAA Section Ammunition Column
