= Charles Granville Fortescue =

British Army officer

Brigadier-General Charles Granville Fortescue CB CMG DSO
- Born: 30 October 1861; Castle Hill, Ipswich, Suffolk, England
- Died: 1 February 1951 (aged 89); Brixworth, Northamptonshire, England
- Relatives: Hugh, 3rd Earl Fortescue (father); Hugh, 4th Earl Fortescue (brother); Sir John Fortescue (brother); Sir Seymour Fortescue (brother)
- Military career
- Allegiance: United Kingdom
- Branch: British Army
- Service years: 1881–1919
- Rank: Brigadier-General
- Unit: Rifle Brigade (The Prince Consort's Own)
- Commands: 226th Mixed Brigade; 212th Infantry Brigade; 80th Infantry Brigade
- Conflicts: Second Boer War; First World War
- Awards: Companion of the Order of the Bath; Companion of the Order of St Michael and St George; Distinguished Service Order; Mentioned in Despatches; Grand Cross of the Order of the White Eagle (Serbia)

Brigadier-General Charles Granville Fortescue, CB, CMG, DSO (20 October 1861 – 1 February 1951) was an officer of the British Army in the colonial wars of the late 19th century, the Second Boer War and the First World War.

== Early life ==
The Honourable Charles Granville Fortescue was born on 30 October 1861, the sixth and youngest son of Hugh Fortescue, 3rd Earl Fortescue. Sir John Fortescue, the historian of the British Army, was his elder brother.

Fortescue was educated at Harrow School and, after graduating from the Royal Military College at Sandhurst, was commissioned as a second lieutenant into the Rifle Brigade (The Prince Consort's Own) on 22 January 1881. Two other officers who also received their commissions on the same date, and who would later rise to become full generals, were Richard Haking and John Cowans while another, Robert Broadwood, became a lieutenant general, and Frederick Gordon, William Lowe, and Colin Mackenzie all became major generals. He was promoted to lieutenant on 1 July that year.

== Early military career ==
Fortescue saw his first active service with the 4th Battalion of his regiment in 1888–9 during the pacification operations in Upper Burma that followed the Third Anglo-Burmese War. Promoted to captain on 14 December 1890, he attended the Staff College, Camberley, from 1893–1894 and became adjutant of the 4th Battalion, Rifle Brigade in 1895. In 1897 he was seconded for service with the Colonial Office in the Northern Territories of the Gold Coast, including an expedition to Karaga, for which he was mentioned in dispatches and being appointed a Companion of the Order of St Michael and St George. Having achieved the rank of major on 5 December 1898, he was also promoted to brevet lieutenant colonel on 8 July 1899.

Fortescue returned from West Africa in 1899 to take up the post of private secretary to the Secretary of State for War, the Marquess of Lansdowne, but just before the outbreak of the Second Boer War he went to South Africa as a brigade major in the Natal Field Force under Sir George White. He was in the Siege of Ladysmith, and afterwards served as a staff officer in the operations in Northern Natal (including the action at Laing's Nek) and in Eastern Transvaal (including the actions at Belfast and Lydenburg). For the last six months of the war he relinquished staff work and commanded a column in the field. He was mentioned in despatches four times during the war and awarded the Distinguished Service Order.

After the war ended, Fortescue stayed on for four months (May to September 1902) as military secretary to General Neville Lyttelton, the general commanding the occupation force in South Africa. He left Port Natal on the SS Malta in late September 1902, together with other officers and men of the 2nd Battalion, Rifle Brigade who were transferred to Egypt. He was promoted to brevet colonel in July 1905 and lieutenant colonel in December 1907.

He was appointed a Companion of the Order of the Bath in the 1911 Coronation Honours. In December 1911 he was promoted to colonel and, after having commanded a battalion for four years, was placed on half-pay. In April 1912, returning to normal pay, Fortescue was promoted to the temporary rank of brigadier general and appointed a brigadier general, general staff (BGGS) of Eastern Command, taking over from Brigadier General Aylmer Haldane.

== First World War ==
On the outbreak of the First World War in August 1914 he became BGGS to Third Army of Central Force within Home Forces, but shortly afterwards he was appointed to command a brigade of Regular Army troops returning from overseas garrisons for service on the Western Front. This became 80th Brigade in the 27th Division and assembled around Winchester. The brigade included his old battalion, the 4th Rifle Brigade, returned from India, and the first Canadian volunteer unit to arrive in Europe, the Princess Patricia's Canadian Light Infantry.

The 27th Division landed in France in December 1914 and was concentrated by 25 December. In February 1915 it was holding the line near St Eloi, with localised fighting going on. On 28 February the 'Princess Pat's' carried out a successful local attack. On 14 March the Germans made a surprise attack on 80th Brigade in the late afternoon, firing two mines and capturing St Eloi village, the surrounding trenches, and an artificial heap of earth known as 'The Mound'. There was severe hand-to-hand fighting in which the 2nd King's Shropshire Light Infantry and 4th Rifle Brigade distinguished themselves, but Fortescue was unable to make an immediate counter-attack because no reserves were on hand. The neighbouring 82nd Brigade did make a counter-attack after midnight that included 4th King's Royal Rifle Corps of 80th Brigade and retook some of the ground, but the Germans had already consolidated their hold on The Mound.

Shortly after St Eloi, Fortescue returned to Home Forces to take up the position of BGGS with First Army of Central Force. In November 1916 he received command of 212th Brigade of the 71st Division, a new Home Defence formation composed of men who were unfit for overseas service. Once it had formed, 71st Division was assigned to guard the coast of Essex. After a year in command of 212th Brigade, Fortescue took over the 226th Mixed Brigade, which was attached to 71st Division. In January 1918 the War Office decided to break up the 71st Division by mid-March. Fortescue was then sent as part of a military mission to the Serbs fighting on the Macedonian front until the end of the war.

== Post-war ==
Fortescue was awarded the Serbian Order of the White Eagle, 1st Class, with swords. He retired from the British Army on 31 October 1919 with the honorary rank of brigadier general.

== Family ==
In 1906 Fortescue married Ethel Rosa, daughter of General Sir Charles Clarke, 3rd Baronet and widow of Captain Ernest Campbell. They had two daughters:

- Anne Mary, born 17 July 1910, married 17 October 1929 to Henry Reginald Aked Garnett, who died in 1944.
- Lilah Rose, TD, born 15 October 1912, who served in the Auxiliary Territorial Service during the Second World War.

Before the First World War, Fortescue had accompanied his historian brother to some of the old battlefields of Europe, and he did a considerable amount of research for the last volume of Sir John's History of the British Army, which appeared in 1930.

Charles Fortescue died on 1 February 1951.

== External sources ==
- Armchair General on St Eloi
