= Abattoir Hill =

Archaeological site in Israel

Abattoir Hill, pronounced in Hebrew as Giv'at Bet Hamitbahayim (Hebrew: גבעת בית המטבחיים), is an archaeological site in Tel Aviv, Israel, located near the southern bank of the Yarkon River. The site is a natural hill made of Kurkar, a local type of sandstone. In 1930 ancient burials and tools were discovered upon the construction of an abattoir on top of the hill, hence its name. Between 1950 and 1953, Israeli archaeologist Jacob Kaplan studied the site, ahead of the construction of new residential units and streets on it. He discovered the remains of burials and small settlements spanning from the Chalcolithic period to the Persian period (4500 – 332 BCE). In 1965 and 1970 Kaplan conducted two more excavations next to the slaughterhouse and discovered settlement remains from the Bronze Age and the Persian period. In February 1992 a salvage excavation was conducted by Yossi Levy after antiquities were damaged by development works. Two burial tombs dated between the Persian period and the Early Arab period (538 BCE – 1099 CE) were discovered. In June 1998 another salvage excavation was conducted by Kamil Sari after ancient remains were damaged by work of the Electric Corporation. Two kilns were unearthed, similar to two found by Kaplan.

== Geography ==
The kurkar hill has a length of approximately 400 meters and a height of 15 meters above its surroundings. The boundaries of the site were determined by Jacob Kaplan who first studied the site in the 1950s like so: west: Agripas, Hurkanos, and Yehoshua Bin-Nun streets; south: Nordau Boulevard; east Alexander Yanai street; north: Shimon HaTarsi street. The archaeological discoveries were found in these sites (from north to south):

- Shimon HaTarsi 31 Street - The northernmost part of the hill, overlooking the Yarkon River. Contains remains of a settlement from the Byzantine period and burial caves used between the Persian and Early Arab period.
- Hill Square - An area on top of the hill which was left as a garden. Remains of a Middle Bronze Age settlement linked to the Hyksos was found
- Yanai Street - On the eastern slope of the hill, east of the abattoir building, between two buildings in the street. Two hewn caves indicating the presence of a settlement were discovered. They were dug in the Chalcolithic period and were used in later periods.
- Nordau Boulevard 93 - The southernmost site, featuring an Early Bronze Age burial. On top of the cave was a settlement from the Persian period.

== History ==
The earliest evidence of human settlement in Abattoir Hill is found in two caves dated to the Chalcolithic period in the Yanai Street site. The first is a large cave-dwelling with a stone pillar supporting its ceiling. The entrance of the cave faces the Yarkon River in the north, and in front of it lies an elliptical courtyard where installations used for various crafts such as pottery making were discovered. Several rooms branch out of the cave's hall including one where a mixed layer of ash, potsherds and animal bone was found. The second cave is located more to the south and its ceiling has collapsed. The cave was used as a burial cave, as fragments of clay ossuaries, used to store human skeletons were discovered. One of the ossuary fragments featured a snake motif. Since this discovery, more similar burial caves of this period were found around the country. In addition to the caves, trash pits hewn in rock, with bones and potsherds inside were also excavated.

At end of the 4th millennium BC, the region entered the Bronze Age period, which marks the beginning of urbanization. Around this time a temporary settlement was established in Abattoir Hill and in the nearby Bashan Street site. Remains of this settlement were found in the older Chalcolithic cave-dwelling and its courtyard in Yannai street. In Nordau 93, other caves were found, most damaged by later construction, except for one which was successfully excavated. Unlike the previous inhabitants of the Chalcolithic period who buried their dead inside ossuaries, the inhabitants of this settlement cremated the dead and buried only the ashes and scorched bones. Pottery found next to the burials served as funerary offerings. One notable tool was a fine oil lamp, designed for effective use of the oil.

An unfortified settlement was discovered in the Hill Square, at the northern part of the site. The remains included round barns hewn in rock as well as pits used to trash bones and potsherds. It was dated by Kaplan to the Middle Bronze Age II period, the time of the Hyksos, a Mesopotamian people who ruled over Ancient Egypt at around 1650 – 1550 BCE. Kaplan believes that this settlement was a small village or an estate owned by a Hyksos nobleman from the nearby Jaffa or Tel Gerisa. Burial of a man and a donkey were discovered inside one of the older Chalcolithic caves. Two kilns of this period were discovered in by Kaplan in Hill Square and near the Yanai Street caves. Another two were discovered in 1998 by Kamil Sari in the Yehoshua Bin-Nun Street. These kilns, as well as many other kilns of the period found in Tel Aviv, indicate a high demand for pottery and high population density, common in this period. Few remains of the Late Bronze Age (1550 – 1200 BCE) were discovered, leading Kaplan to assume that the human settlement in the site was insignificant back then. Noteworthy, in the late centuries of this period, especially the 13th century BCE, the excavation determined that the site was completely deserted.

Abattoir Hill remained deserted or sparsely populated throughout the early Iron Age. A settlement from the 10th century BCE, the time of the United Kingdom of Israel, was discovered in the Hill Square. The settlement was destroyed in the 8th century BCE, as signs of destruction by fire were found. These are attributed to the military campaign of Sennacherib, the king of the Neo-Assyrian Empire. It was also suggested that the assemblage of potsherds from the 8th century BCE are an evidence to local military preparations ahead of the Assyrian attack. Remains of structures and pottery from the Persian period were found on top of the Nordau 93 Early Bronze Age burial cave.

Two caves were discovered Shimon HaTarsi street 31, in the northern edge of the hill. Both caves were hewn in rock and were severely damaged by thieves. One of the caves which was successfully excavated had features of a burial cave and on the floor, an abundance of human bones was discovered. Potsherds were also found and are dated to the Persian, Hellenistic, Roman, Byzantine and Early Muslim periods, as well as a worn coin of the 1st century CE. Archaeologist Yossi Levy who excavated the caves suggested that they were part of Jewish or Samaritan burial, based on their similarity to a Jewish cemetery found in Abu Kabir (4th – 5th century CE) and a Samaritan cemetery in Tel Baruch (5th – 6th century CE).

== Bibliography ==
- "Secret History of Tel Aviv: What Happened Here in 200,000 Years?", Eretz Israel Museum, Tel Aviv, 2009
- Jacob Kaplan (September 1972). "The Archaeology and History of Tel Aviv-Jaffa". The Biblical Archaeologist. 35 (3). The University of Chicago Press: 66–95. doi:10.2307/3211001. JSTOR 3211001.
