= 157th (Highland Light Infantry) Brigade =

Highland Light Infantry Brigade 157th (Highland Light Infantry) Brigade 157th Infantry Brigade
- Active: 1902-1919; 1920–1947
- Country: United Kingdom
- Branch: British Army
- Type: Infantry
- Role: Infantry; Mountain; Air Landing
- Size: Brigade
- Part of: 52nd (Lowland) Infantry Division
- Engagements: First World War; Second World War

The 157th (Highland Light Infantry) Brigade was an infantry brigade of the British Army. The brigade fought in both the First and the Second World Wars, assigned to 52nd (Lowland) Infantry Division.

== Origins ==
The Highland Light Infantry Brigade was originally a Volunteer Infantry Brigade formed in 1902 when the former Glasgow Brigade of the Volunteer Force was split up. The four Volunteer Battalions of the Highland Light Infantry (HLI) constituted one brigade, while the four Volunteer Battalions of the Cameronians (Scottish Rifles) formed the other (the Scottish Rifles Brigade, later the 156th (Scottish Rifles) Brigade of the TF).

From 1902 to 1908 the Highland Light Infantry Brigade had the following composition:

- 1st Volunteer Battalion, Highland Light Infantry, at 24 Hill Street, Garnethill, Glasgow
- 2nd Volunteer Battalion, Highland Light Infantry, at Kelvinhaugh Road, Overnewtown
- 3rd (Blythswood) Volunteer Battalion, Highland Light Infantry, at 105 West George Street, Glasgow
- 9th Lanarkshire Volunteer Rifle Corps at Lanark
- 5th (Glasgow Highland) Volunteer Battalion, Highland Light Infantry, at 81 Greendyke Street, Glasgow
- Bearer Company, Royal Army Medical Corps, later an Army Service Corps Company

The Brigade Headquarters (HQ) was at Hamilton, later at 2 West Regent Street, Glasgow. Initially the brigade commander was the Officer Commanding the 26th and 71st Regimental Districts (the HLI districts), later it was Colonel R.C. MacKenzie, former commanding officer of the 1st VB, HLI.

== Territorial Force ==
After the Volunteers were subsumed into the new Territorial Force (TF) under the Haldane Reforms of 1908, the Highland Light Infantry Brigade formed part of the Lowland Division of the TF with the following composition:

- 5th (City of Glasgow) Battalion, Highland Light Infantry
- 6th (City of Glasgow) Battalion, Highland Light Infantry
- 7th (Blythswood) Battalion, Highland Light Infantry
- 9th (Glasgow Highlanders) Battalion, Highland Light Infantry

== First World War ==
Upon the outbreak of the First World War in August 1914, the Lowland Division was mobilised immediately for full-time war service. In May 1915 the brigade became the 157th (1/1st Highland Light Infantry) Brigade and the division the 52nd (Lowland) Division. The battalions were also redesignated with the '1/' prefix, 1/4th HLI. This was to avoid confusion with the 2nd Line duplicates which were also forming up and training as the 196th (2/1st Highland Light Infantry) Brigade of 65th (2nd Lowland) Division. The 2nd Line units consisted mainly of those few men who did not volunteer for overseas service when asked at the outbreak of war, together with the many recruits, and were intended to act as a reserve for the 1st Line units being sent overseas. During the war the brigade and division served in the Middle East and later on the Western Front.

=== Order of battle ===
The composition of the brigade was as follows:

- 1/5th (City of Glasgow) Battalion, Highland Light Infantry
- 1/6th (City of Glasgow) Battalion, Highland Light Infantry
- 1/7th (Blythswood) Battalion, Highland Light Infantry
- 1/9th (Glasgow Highlanders) Battalion, Highland Light Infantry (left November 1914)
- 1/5th (Renfrewshire) Battalion, Princess Louise's (Argyll and Sutherland Highlanders) (from April 1915, left 28 June 1918)
- 157th Machine Gun Company (formed 14 March 1916, joined 52nd Battalion, Machine Gun Corps 28 April 1918)
- 157th Trench Mortar Battery (formed 11 June 1917)

== Inter-war period ==
After the First World War both the brigade and division were disbanded, as was the rest of the Territorial Force. With the creation of the Territorial Army in 1921, the brigade was reconstituted within the 52nd Division as the 157th (Highland Light Infantry) Infantry Brigade, again composed of the 5th, 6th, 7th and 9th battalions of the Highland Light Infantry, and remained this until 1938.

In 1938, due to an increasing need to strengthen the anti-aircraft defences of the country, the 7th Battalion, HLI was transferred to the Royal Artillery and converted into 83rd (7th (Blythswood) Battalion, Highland Light Infantry) Anti-Aircraft Brigade, Royal Artillery. In the same year the 9th (Glasgow Highland) Battalion was redesignated 1st Battalion, Glasgow Highlanders but still retained the Highland Light Infantry as its parent regiment. In the following year the brigade was redesignated as 157th Infantry Brigade.

== Second World War ==
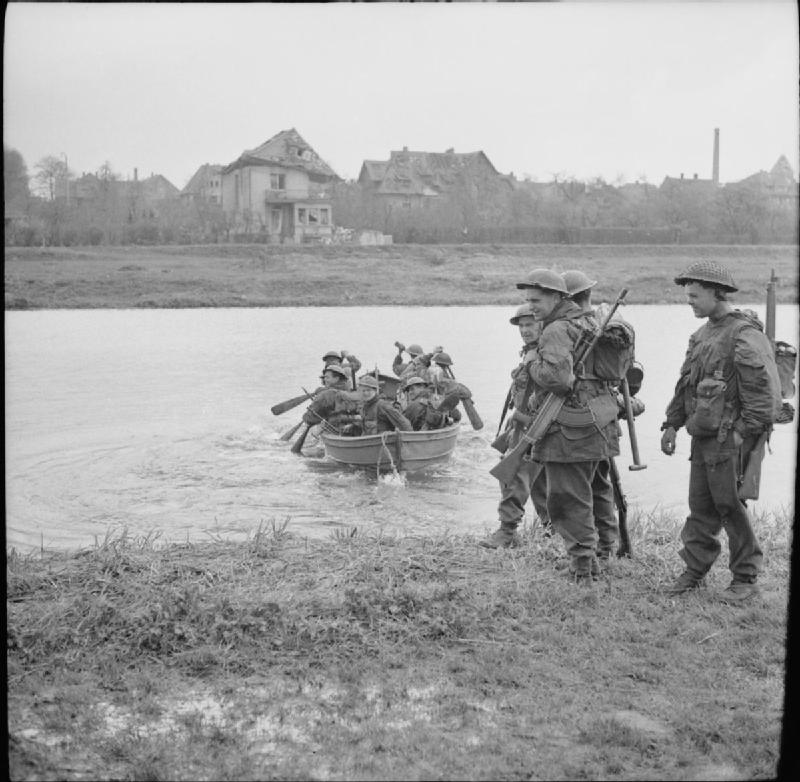
Men of the 7th Battalion, Cameronians (Scottish Rifles) use a small boat to cross a canal in the town of Rheine, Germany, 3 April 1945.

During the Second World War, the brigade served with the 52nd Division during Operation Aerial in France in mid-1940 to cover the withdrawal of the British Expeditionary Force (BEF) being evacuated from France. In 1942 to June 1944 the division was trained in mountain warfare, but was never used in the role. They were then trained in airlanding operations but were again never utilised in the role. In October 1944 they were sent to Belgium to join the 21st Army Group and were attached to the First Canadian Army and fought in the Battle of the Scheldt. The brigade took part in Operation Blackcock in 1945 and ended the war by the River Elbe.

James Cassels, a future field marshal and Chief of the Imperial General Staff (CIGS), was a brigade major with this brigade from May 1940−October 1941.

=== Order of battle ===
The 157th Infantry Brigade was constituted as follows during the war:

- 5th Battalion, Highland Light Infantry
- 6th Battalion, Highland Light Infantry (to 12 February 1945)
- 1st Battalion, Glasgow Highlanders (to 12 March 1945)
- 157th Infantry Brigade Anti-Tank Company (formed 12 May 1940, disbanded 7 January 1941)
- 5th Battalion, King's Own Scottish Borderers (from 12 February 1945)
- 7th Battalion, Cameronians (Scottish Rifles) (from 14 March 1945)

On 12 August 1944 the brigade was organised as a Brigade Group to be the sea echelon for 52nd (L) Division's projected airlanding operations. 157 Brigade Group moved to NW Europe independently with the following additional units under command:

- 52nd Reconnaissance Regiment, Royal Armoured Corps
- 79th (Lowland) Field Regiment, Royal Artillery
- 304 A/T Battery, 54th (Queen’s Own Royal Glasgow Yeomanry) Anti-Tank Regiment, Royal Artillery
- 354 LAA Battery, 108th Light Anti-Aircraft Regiment, Royal Artillery
- 243 Field Park Company, Royal Engineers
- 17 Bridging Platoon, Royal Engineers
- 529 Infantry Brigade Company, Royal Army Service Corps
- 76 Divisional Troops Company, Royal Army Service Corps
- 157 Field Ambulance, Royal Army Medical Corps
- 52 Field Maintenance Section, Royal Army Ordnance Corps
- Detachment 52 Divisional Ordnance Field Park, Royal Army Ordnance Corps
- 157 Brigade Workshops, Royal Electrical and Mechanical Engineers
- Two Sections, 52 Divisional Field Provost Company, Royal Military Police

The brigade and attached units reverted to divisional command when 52nd (L) Division arrived by sea in October to take part in ground operations.

=== Commanders ===
The following officers commanded the 157th Infantry Brigade during the war:

- Brigadier N.R. Campbell (until 23 April 1940)
- Brigadier Sir J.E. Laurie, Bart (from 23 April 1940 until 30 March 1941)
- Brigadier E. Hakewill Smith (from 30 March 1941 until 22 March 1942)
- Brigadier F.L. Johnston (from 22 March 1942 until 22 November 1943)
- Brigadier J.D. Russell (from 22 November 1943 until 26 January 1945)
- Brigadier E.H.G. Grant (from 26 January until 24 July 1945)
- Lieutenant-Colonel R.L.C. Rose (Acting, from 24 July 1945)

== Bibliography ==
- Maj A.F. Becke,History of the Great War: Order of Battle of Divisions, Part 2a: The Territorial Force Mounted Divisions and the 1st-Line Territorial Force Divisions (42–56), London: HM Stationery Office, 1935/Uckfield: Naval & Military Press, 2007, ISBN 1-847347-39-8.
- Col John K. Dunlop, The Development of the British Army 1899–1914, London: Methuen, 1938.
- James, E. A. (1978). British Regiments 1914–18. London: Samson Books Limited. ISBN 0-906304-03-2.
- Joslen, H. F. (2003) [1960]. Orders of Battle: Second World War, 1939–1945. Uckfield, East Sussex: Naval and Military Press. ISBN 978-1-84342-474-1.
- Edward M. Spiers, The Army and Society 1815–1914, London: Longmans, 1980, ISBN 0-582-48565-7.
- Lt-Col R.R. Thompson, The Fifty-Second (Lowland) Division 1914–1918, Glasgow: Maclehose, Jackson 1923/Uckfield: Naval & Military, 2004, ISBN 978-1-84342993-7.

== External sources ==
- Mark Conrad, The British Army, 1914 (archive site)
- The Long, Long Trail
- The Regimental Warpath 1914–1918 (archive site)
