= 155th (South Scottish) Brigade =

South Scottish Brigade 155th (South Scottish) Brigade 155th Infantry Brigade 155th Independent Infantry Brigade
- Active: 1902-1919; 1920–1946; 1947-1955
- Country: United Kingdom
- Branch: Territorial Army
- Type: Infantry, Mountain and Air Landing
- Size: Brigade
- Part of: 52nd (Lowland) Infantry Division

The 155th (South Scottish) Brigade was an infantry brigade of the British Army that saw active service in both the First and the Second World Wars. Assigned to the 52nd (Lowland) Division, the brigade saw active service in the Middle East and on the Western Front during the First World War. During the Second World War, now the 155th Infantry Brigade, it continued to serve with the 52nd Division in Operation Dynamo, and later in North-western Europe from late 1944 until May 1945.

== Origins ==
The Scottish Border Brigade (originally the South of Scotland Brigade) was a Volunteer Infantry Brigade of the British Army formed in 1888.

The enthusiasm for the Volunteer movement following an invasion scare in 1859 saw the creation of many Rifle, Artillery and Engineer Volunteer units composed of part-time soldiers eager to supplement the Regular British Army in time of need. The Stanhope Memorandum of 1888 proposed a comprehensive Mobilisation Scheme for Volunteer units, which would assemble in their own brigades at key points in case of war. In peacetime, these brigades provided a structure for collective training. Under this scheme the Volunteer Battalions in the Scottish Border areas would assemble at Hawick.

From 1888, the South of Scotland/Scottish Border Brigade had the following composition:

- 1st Roxburgh and Selkirk (The Border) Rifle Volunteer Corps, with the 1st Roxburgh Mounted Rifles Volunteers attached, at Newtown St Boswells
- 2nd (Berwickshire) Volunteer Battalion, Kings Own Scottish Borderers, at Duns
- 3rd (Dumfries) Volunteer Battalion, Kings Own Scottish Borderers, at Dumfries
- Galloway Volunteer Rifle Corps at Castle Douglas
- 2nd (Angus) Volunteer Battalion, The Royal Highlanders (Black Watch), at Arbroath
- 5th (Perthshire) Volunteer Battalion, The Royal Highlanders (Black Watch), at Birnham
- Supply Detachment, Army Service Corps
- Bearer Company, Army Hospital Corps (later Royal Army Medical Corps)

In the early 1890s, the two Black Watch battalions were replaced by:

- 6th Volunteer Battalion, Royal Scots, at Penicuik
- 7th Volunteer Battalion, Royal Scots, at Haddington

After a further reorganisation in 1902, the 1st and 2nd VBs of the Royal Scots Fusiliers (at Kilmarnock and Ayr respectively) replaced the two battalions of the Royal Scots.

The Brigade Headquarters (HQ) and place of assembly was at Hawick and Colonel Viscount Melgund (later 4th Earl of Minto) was appointed brigade commander on 11 July 1888. From 1900, the brigade commander was the Officer Commanding the 25th Regimental District (the KOSB district) at Berwick-upon-Tweed, then from 1906 it was commanded by retired Colonel P.D. Trotter.

== Territorial Force ==
After the Volunteers were subsumed into the new Territorial Force (TF) under the Haldane Reforms of 1908, the South Scottish Brigade (as it was now designated) formed part of the Lowland Division of the TF with the following composition:

- 4th Battalion, Royal Scots Fusiliers, at Kilmarnock
- 5th Battalion, Royal Scots Fusiliers, at Ayr
- 4th (Border) Battalion, Kings Own Scottish Borderers (from 1st Roxburgh & Selkirk VRC and 2nd VB), at Galashiels
- 5th (Dumfries & Galloway) Battalion, Kings Own Scottish Borderers (from 3rd VB and Galloway VRC), at Dumfries

== First World War ==
On the outbreak of the First World War in August 1914, the Lowland Division was mobilised for full-time war service. In 1915, the division was numbered as the 52nd (Lowland) Division and the brigade the 155th (1/1st South Scottish) Brigade and the battalions received the '1/' prefix (1/4th Royal Royal Scots Fusiliers) to distinguish them from their 2nd Line units being formed as the 194th (2/1st South Scottish) Brigade, part of 65th (2nd Lowland) Division. During the First World War the brigade served in the Middle Eastern theatre and later on the Western Front.

=== First World War order of battle ===
- 1/4th Battalion, Royal Scots Fusiliers
- 1/5th Battalion, Royal Scots Fusiliers
- 1/4th Battalion, King's Own Scottish Borderers
- 1/5th Battalion, King's Own Scottish Borderers (left 28 June 1918)
- 155th Machine Gun Company, Machine Gun Corps (formed 23 March 1916, moved to 52nd Battalion, Machine Gun Corps 28 April 1918)
- 155th Trench Mortar Battery (formed 24 May 1917)

== Between the wars ==
After the war, the brigade and division were both disbanded as was the Territorial Force. The Territorial Force was, however, reformed in 1920 as the Territorial Army and the 52nd Division was reconstituted as was the brigade, which was redesignated as the 155th (South Scottish) Infantry Brigade. The brigade was reformed with the same units as it had before the First World War.

In 1921, the 4th and 5th battalions of the Royal Scots Fusiliers were amalgamated into the 4th/5th Battalion, Royal Scots Fusiliers and it was later transferred to the 156th (Scottish Rifles) Infantry Brigade, later redesignated 156th (West Scottish) Infantry Brigade. The 155th Brigade later received the 4th/5th (Queen's Edinburgh Rifles) Battalion, Royal Scots (the amalgamated 4th and 5th battalions) and the 7th/9th (Highlanders) Battalion, Royal Scots (the amalgamated 7th and 9th) both arrived from 156th Brigade and was redesignated 155th (East Scottish) Infantry Brigade.

In the late 1930s, there was an increasing need for anti-aircraft defences throughout Britain and many infantry battalions were converted into anti-aircraft or searchlight units of the Royal Artillery or Royal Engineers. In 1938, all infantry brigades of the British Army were reduced from four to three battalions and, in the same year, the 4th/5th Battalion, Royal Scots was converted into an anti-aircraft role, becoming the 4th/5th Battalion, Royal Scots (52nd Searchlight Regiment). In 1939 the brigade was finally redesignated 155th Infantry Brigade.

== Second World War ==
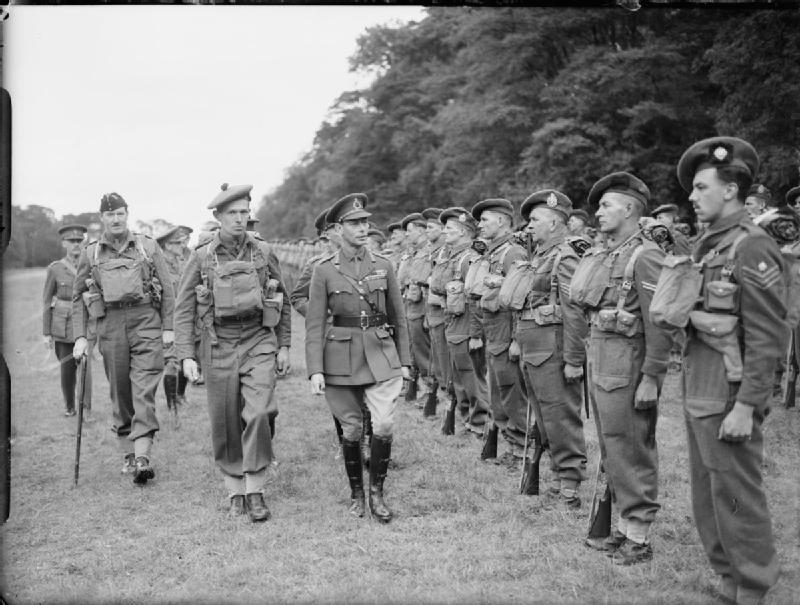
King George VI inspecting men of 155th Brigade Reconnaissance Group at Gorleston in Norfolk, 23 August 1940.

During the Second World War, the 155th Infantry Brigade served with the 52nd Division during Operation Aerial in France in 1940 to cover the withdrawal of the British Expeditionary Force (BEF) which was being evacuated from France. The 52nd Division was itself evacuated from France on 17 June 1940, and spent many years on anti-invasion duties, training to repel an expected German invasion of Britain. From May 1942 to June 1944, the division was trained in mountain warfare yet was never used in the role. They were then trained in airlanding operations but were, again, never utilised in the role. In October 1944, they were sent to Belgium as a standard infantry division to join the 21st Army Group and were attached to First Canadian Army and fought in the Battle of the Scheldt where the 52nd Division gained an excellent reputation. The brigade was attached to 7th Armoured Division during Operation Blackcock in 1945 and ended the war by the River Elbe.

=== Second World War order of battle ===
156th Brigade was constituted as follows during the war:

- 7th/9th Battalion, Royal Scots
- 4th Battalion, King's Own Scottish Borderers
- 5th Battalion, King's Own Scottish Borderers (to 12 February 1945)
- 155th Infantry Brigade Anti-Tank Company (formed 12 May 1940, disbanded 7 January 1941)
- 6th Battalion, Highland Light Infantry (from 12 February 1945)

=== commanders ===
The following officers commanded 155th Brigade during the war:

- Brigadier T. Grainger-Stewart (until 14 February 1942)
- Brigadier C.D. Moorhead (from 14 February until 28 July 1942)
- Lieutenant-Colonel T.H.M. Murray (Acting, from 28 to 30 July 1942)
- Brigadier G.P. Miller (from 30 July 1942 until 27 January 1943)
- Lieutenant-Colonel J.T. Campbell (Acting, from 27 January until 16 February 1943)
- Brigadier E. Hakewill Smith (from 16 February until 19 November 1943)
- Lieutenant-Colonel W.F.R. Turner (Acting, from 19 November until 9 December 1943)
- Lieutenant-Colonel W.A.H. Maxwell (Acting, from 9 to 11 December 1943)
- Brigadier J.F.S. McLaren (from 11 December 1943 until 4 February 1945, from 20 February to 25 June, again from 30 June to 31 July, and again from 12 August 1945)
- Lieutenant-Colonel W.F.R. Turner (Acting, from 4 to 15 February 1945)
- Lieutenant-Colonel E.L. Percival (Acting, from 15 to 20 February 1945)
- Lieutenant-Colonel J.G. Dawson (Acting, from 25 to 30 June 1945)
- Lieutenant-Colonel E.L. Percival (Acting, from 31 July until 12 August 1945)

== Victoria Cross recipients ==
- Fusilier David Ross Lauder, 1/4th Battalion, Royal Scots Fusiliers, First World War
- 2nd Lieutenant Stanley Henry Parry Boughey, 1/4th Battalion, Royal Scots Fusiliers, First World War
- 2nd Lieutenant John Manson Craig, 1/4th Battalion, Royal Scots Fusiliers, First World War

== Bibliography ==
- Becke, Archibald F. (1936). Order of Battle of Divisions Part 2A. The Territorial Force Mounted Divisions and the 1st-Line Territorial Force Divisions (42–56). London: HMSO. OCLC 4405016.
- John K. Dunlop, The Development of the British Army 1899–1914, London: Methuen, 1938.
- Joslen, H. F. (2003) [1960]. Orders of Battle: Second World War, 1939–1945. Uckfield, East Sussex: Naval and Military Press. ISBN 978-1-84342-474-1.
- Edward M. Spiers, The Army and Society 1815–1914, London: Longmans, 1980, ISBN 0-582-48565-7.
- R.R. Thompson, The Fifty-Second (Lowland) Division 1914–1918, Glasgow: Maclehose, Jackson 1923/Uckfield: Naval & Military, 2004, ISBN 978-1-84342993-7.

== External sources ==
- Mark Conrad, The British Army, 1914 (archive site)
- The Long, Long Trail
- The Regimental Warpath 1914–1918 (archive site)
