= XXXV Corps =

35 Corps, 35th Corps, Thirty-fifth Corps, or XXXV Corps may refer to:

== United Kingdom ==
- 35th (2nd Rifle Rangers) Lanarkshire Rifle Volunteer Corps
- 35th (Enfield) Middlesex Rifle Volunteer Corps
- 35th (Kinver) Staffordshire Rifle Volunteer Corps

== Other countries ==
- 35th Army Corps (France)
- XXXV Army Corps (Wehrmacht), Germany
- XXXV Army Corps (Italy)
- 35th Army Corps (Russian Empire)
- 35th Guards Rifle Corps, Soviet Union
- XXXV Airborne Corps, a diversionary 'phantom' unit of the United States Army

== See also ==
- List of military corps by number
- 35th Army (disambiguation)
- 35th Division (disambiguation)
- 35th Brigade (disambiguation)
- 35th Regiment (disambiguation)
- 35th Battalion (disambiguation)
- 35th Squadron (disambiguation)
- 35th (disambiguation)
