= 35th Cavalry =

35th Cavalry may refer to:

- 35th Cavalry Division (Soviet Union), a Soviet cavalry division
- 35th Scinde Horse
- 35th (Brown's) Texas Cavalry Regiment
- 35th (Likens') Texas Cavalry Regiment
- 35th Virginia Cavalry Battalion
- 35th (Middlesex) Company, Imperial Yeomanry

== See also ==
- 35th Division (disambiguation)
- 35th Brigade (disambiguation)
- 35th Regiment (disambiguation)
- 35th (disambiguation)
