= 35th Army =

35th Army may refer to:

- 35th Army (Red Army), a Soviet unit created during World War II and disbanded shortly after
- 35th Guards Combined Arms Army, a unit of the Soviet and Russian armed forces
- Thirty-Fifth Army (Japan), a unit of the Imperial Japanese Army

== See also ==
- List of armies by number
- XXXV Corps (disambiguation)
- 35th Division (disambiguation)
- 35th Brigade (disambiguation)
- 35th Regiment (disambiguation)
- 35th Battalion (disambiguation)
- 35th Squadron (disambiguation)
- 35th (disambiguation)
