= 35th =

35th is the ordinal form of the number 35. 35th or Thirty-fifth may also refer to:

- A fraction, 1/35, equal to one of 35 equal parts

== Geography ==
- 35th meridian east, a line of longitude
- 35th meridian west, a line of longitude
- 35th parallel north, a circle of latitude
- 35th parallel south

== Military units ==
- 35th Army (disambiguation)
- 35th Battalion (disambiguation)
- 35th Brigade (disambiguation)
- 35th Division (disambiguation)
- 35th Regiment (disambiguation)
- 35th Squadron (disambiguation)
- 35th Fighter Wing, an air combat unit of the United States Air Force
- 35th Infantry Division (United States), a formation of the National Guard since World War I
- 35th Infantry Regiment (United States), a regiment created on 1 July 1916 at Douglas, Arizona

== Mass transit ==
- 35th Street (disambiguation)
- 35th Street station, Metra station in Chicago
- 35th–Bronzeville–IIT station, in Chicago on the Green Line
- 35th/Archer station, in Chicago on the Orange Line
- Sox–35th station, in Chicago on the Red Line
- Taraval and 35th Avenue station, former light rail station in San Francisco, California

== Other ==
- Thirty-fifth Amendment
- 35th century
- 35th century BC

== See also ==
- 35 (disambiguation)
