= Thomas Montgomery-Cuninghame =

Thomas Montgomery-Cuninghame may refer to:

- Sir Thomas Montgomery-Cuninghame, 10th Baronet (1877–1945), British Army officer
- Sir Thomas Montgomery-Cuninghame, 8th Baronet (c. 1808–1870), British Army officer
