= Pamela Underwood =

British florist

- Born: Pamela Richenda Cubitt Montgomery-Cuninghame; 10 March 1910; Ballyfair, Ireland
- Died: 30 April 1978 (aged 68); Colchester, Essex
- Occupation: nursery owner
- Known for: silver plant enthusiast
- Spouses: Thomas Abdy Combe; Desmond Fitzgerald Underwood
- Parent(s): Sir Thomas Montgomery-Cuninghame, 10th Baronet; Alice des Vœux

Pamela Richenda Cubitt Underwood (née Montgomery-Cuninghame; 10 March 1910 – 30 April 1978), also known as Mrs Desmond Underwood, was a British florist and nursery woman. She was an early enthusiast for flower arranging and she wrote a book called Grey and Silver Plants.

== Personal life ==
Underwood was born in the townland of Ballyfair in 1910 in County Kildare. Her parents were Alice Frances Denison des Voeux and Colonel Sir Thomas Montgomery-Cuninghame, 10th Baronet and she had one older brother. Her mother was a daughter of Sir William Des Vœux and a great-granddaughter of Sir Charles des Voeux, 1st Baronet. Her parents divorced in 1925 and the same year her father married Nancy Macaulay Foggo of British Columbia, they had two sons. Her mother married the civil servant Sir Aubrey Symonds in 1926.

She married Thomas Abdy Combe, an army officer, in 1932, they divorced in 1941. In 1942 she married Desmond FitzGerald Underwood (d.1968). After the death of her second husband she preferred to be known as "Mrs Desmond Underwood". She had a son and two daughters.

== Career ==
Underwood was trained at the Cheshunt research station and began as a plant grower in the 1930s. She was originally a market gardener, growing mostly tomatoes, but later gradually changed the business to specialise in pink and silver foliage plants. She opened Ramparts nursery for pink and silver plants, at Braiswick, near Colchester. She became internationally known as a specialist in pinks and silver plans and exported her plants around the world, with buyers as far away as the United States, Japan and New Zealand.

She served on Essex County council between 1955 and 1960.

In the early 1950s she became interested in flower arranging. She was a founder member and chairman of Colchester Flower Club, the second flower arranging club in the country. She encouraged Beth Chatto, her neighbour and fellow founder member, to give demonstrations her flower arranging to other clubs, which founded her a new career.

Underwood was an exhibitor at the Chelsea Flower Show for many years. At first some described her foliage plants as "weeds" but eventually she gained recognition and was awarded several medals, including two gold medals. In 1977, her last year of exhibiting, she won a silver gilt floral medal and was also awarded the Royal Horticultural Society's Victoria Medal of Honour. In the same year she planted a silver foliage garden at Buckingham Palace, for which she also supplied the plants, as a gift from the RHS to celebrate the Queen's Silver Jubilee.

She retired from Ramparts in 1977 due to ill health, and the business was taken over by Jack Gingell of Chipping Ongar.

== Writing ==
She wrote Grey and Silver Plants which was published in 1971 using the name of "Mrs Desmond Underwood".
