= Glasgow Brigade =

- Active: 1890–1902
- Country: United Kingdom
- Branch: Volunteer Force
- Type: Infantry
- Size: Brigade
- Garrison/HQ: Glasgow; Hamilton

Commanders
- Notable commanders: Colonel Sir William Cuninghame, VC

The Glasgow Brigade was an infantry formation of Britain's Volunteer Force from 1890 to 1902. It was the forerunner of two formations of the Territorial Force that saw service in both World Wars.

== Origins ==
The enthusiasm for the Volunteer movement following an invasion scare in 1859 saw the creation of many Rifle Volunteer units composed of part-time soldiers eager to supplement the Regular British Army in time of need. The Stanhope Memorandum of 1888 proposed a comprehensive Mobilisation Scheme for Volunteer units, which would assemble in their own brigades at key points in case of war. In peacetime these brigades provided a structure for collective training. Under this scheme a number of Volunteer Battalions of regiments in Southern Scotland would assemble together at Glasgow as the Clyde Brigade.

The Brigade Headquarters (HQ) was at 137 St Vincent Street, Glasgow, and the brigade commander was Colonel Sir William Cuninghame, VC, appointed 17 October 1888.

With a total of 17 battalions this brigade was larger than most Volunteer Infantry Brigades and in 1890 it was split into two, the Volunteer Battalions of the Royal Scots Fusiliers and Argyll and Sutherland Highlanders continuing in the Clyde Brigade, while the Cameronians (Scottish Rifles) and Highland Light Infantry formed a separate Glasgow Brigade. Sir William Cuninghame continued in command of the Glasgow Brigade].

== Organisation ==
From 1890 the Glasgow Brigade had the following composition:

- 1st Lanarkshire Rifle Volunteer Corps (a Volunteer Battalion of the Scottish Rifles)
- 2nd Volunteer Battalion, Scottish Rifles
- 3rd Lanarkshire Rifle Volunteer Corps (a Volunteer Battalion of the Scottish Rifles)
- 4th Volunteer Battalion, Scottish Rifles
- 5th Volunteer Battalion, Scottish Rifles
- 1st Volunteer Battalion, Highland Light Infantry
- 2nd Volunteer Battalion, Highland Light Infantry
- 3rd (Blythswood) Volunteer Battalion, Highland Light Infantry
- 9th Lanarkshire Rifle Volunteer Corps (a Volunteer Battalion of the Highland Light Infantry)
- 5th (Glasgow Highland) Volunteer Battalion, Highland Light Infantry
- Supply Detachment, Army Service Corps
- Bearer Company, Army Hospital Corps, later Royal Army Medical Corps

Sir William Cuninghame retired in 1897, after which the HQ moved to Hamilton, South Lanarkshire and the Officer Commanding 26th and 71st Regimental District (the Cameronians and HLI depot) became ex-officio brigade commander.

== Boer War ==
All the battalions provided volunteers to serve alongside the Regular regiments in the 2nd Boer War and gained the Battle honour South Africa 1900–02.

== Disbandment ==
The Volunteer Infantry Brigades were reorganised in 1902 and the Glasgow Brigade was split up. The four Volunteer Battalions of the Cameronians constituted the new Scottish Rifles Brigade, while the four Volunteer Battalions of the Highland Light Infantry became the Highland Light Infantry Brigade.

These successor brigades were carried through when the Volunteers were subsumed into the new Territorial Force (TF) under the Haldane Reforms of 1908. They formed part of the Lowland Division of the TF. During World War I they became the 156th (Scottish Rifles) Brigade and 157th (Highland Light Infantry) Brigade in the 52nd (Lowland) Division, and formed Second Line duplicates as the 195th (2/1st Scottish Rifles) Brigade and 196th (2/1st Highland Light Infantry) Brigade of the 65th (2nd Lowland) Division.

== External sources ==
- Mark Conrad, The British Army, 1914 (archive site)
- The Long, Long Trail
- The Regimental Warpath 1914–1918 (archive site)
