= 35th Infantry Regiment =

35th Infantry Regiment may refer to:

- 35th Infantry Regiment (United States)
- 35th Infantry Regiment (France)

== See also ==
- 35th Regiment (disambiguation)
