= NS35 =

NS35, NS 35, NS-35, NS.35, or variation, may refer to:

- Blue Origin NS-35
- NSP2 (rotavirus), a rotavirus protein also known as NS35
- Kings West (constituency N.S. 35), Nova Scotia, Canada; a provincial electoral district
- New Penguin Shakespeare volume 35

== See also ==
- NS (disambiguation)
- 35 (disambiguation)
