= AD 35 (disambiguation) =

AD 35, AD35 or AD-35 may refer to:

- AD 35, the 35th year of the Common Era
- Ad35, adenovirus serotype 35
- USS Arrowhead (AD-35), a WWII-era U.S. Navy Shenandoah-class destroyer tender

== See also ==
- AD (disambiguation)
- 35 (disambiguation)
