= Clyde Brigade =

- Active: 1888–1902
- Country: United Kingdom
- Branch: Volunteer Force
- Type: Infantry
- Size: Brigade
- Garrison/HQ: Glasgow; Stirling

Commanders
- Notable commanders: Colonel Sir William Cuninghame, VC

The Clyde Brigade was a Scottish infantry formation of Britain's Volunteer Force from 1888 to 1902.

== Origins ==
The enthusiasm for the Volunteer movement following an invasion scare in 1859 saw the creation of many Rifle Volunteer units composed of part-time soldiers eager to supplement the Regular British Army in time of need. The Stanhope Memorandum of 1888 proposed a comprehensive Mobilisation Scheme for Volunteer units, which would assemble in their own brigades at key points in case of war. In peacetime these brigades provided a structure for collective training. Under this scheme a number of Volunteer Battalions in Southern Scotland would assemble together at Glasgow as the Clyde Brigade.

== Organisation ==
From 1888 the Clyde Brigade had the following composition:

- 1st Volunteer Battalion, Royal Scots Fusiliers
- 2nd Volunteer Battalion, Royal Scots Fusiliers
- 1st Lanarkshire Rifle Volunteers (a Volunteer Battalion of the Cameronians (Scottish Rifles))
- 2nd Volunteer Battalion, Scottish Rifles
- 3rd Lanarkshire Rifle Volunteer Corps (a Volunteer Battalion of the Scottish Rifles)
- 4th Volunteer Battalion, Scottish Rifles
- 5th Volunteer Battalion, Scottish Rifles
- 1st Volunteer Battalion, Highland Light Infantry
- 2nd Volunteer Battalion, Highland Light Infantry
- 3rd (Blythswood) Volunteer Battalion, Highland Light Infantry
- 9th Lanarkshire Rifle Volunteer Corps (a Volunteer Battalion of the Highland Light Infantry)
- 5th (Glasgow Highland) Volunteer Battalion, Highland Light Infantry
- 1st (Renfrewshire) Volunteer Battalion, Argyll and Sutherland Highlanders
- 2nd (Renfrewshire) Volunteer Battalion, Argyll and Sutherland Highlanders
- 3rd (Renfrewshire) Volunteer Battalion, Argyll and Sutherland Highlanders
- 5th Volunteer Battalion, Argyll and Sutherland Highlanders
- 1st Dumbarton Rifle Volunteer Corps (a Volunteer Battalion of the Argyll and Sutherland Highlanders)
- Supply Detachment, Army Service Corps

The Brigade Headquarters (HQ) was at 137 St Vincent Street, Glasgow, and the brigade commander was Colonel Sir William Cuninghame, VC, appointed 17 October 1888.

== Reorganisation ==
With a total of 17 battalions this brigade was larger than most VIBs and in 1890 it was split into two, the Volunteer Battalions of the Royal Scots Fusiliers and Argyll & Sutherland Highlanders continuing in the Clyde Brigade, while the Scottish Rifles and Highland Light Infantry formed a separate Glasgow Brigade. Sir William Cuninghame went to command the Glasgow Brigade and was succeeded in command of the Clyde Brigade by Col Sir Donald Matheson, commanding officer of the 1st Lanarkshire Engineer Volunteer Corps and Honorary Colonel of the Clyde Division, Engineer Volunteers, Submarine Division. The new HQ of the Clyde Brigade was at 142 West George Street, Glasgow.

Sir Donald Matheson resigned in 1898, after which the HQ was moved to Stirling and the Officer Commanding 91st Regimental District (the Argyll & Sutherland Highlanders' depot) became ex-officio brigade commander.

== Boer War ==
All the battalions provided volunteers to serve alongside the Regular regiments in the 2nd Boer War and gained the Battle honours South Africa 1900–01 or South Africa 1900–02.

== Disbandment ==
The Volunteer Infantry Brigades were reorganised in 1902 and the Clyde Brigade was split up. The seven Volunteer Battalions of the Argyll & Sutherland Highlanders (including the 4th and 7th VBs from the Tay Brigade) constituted the new Argyll & Sutherland Highlanders Brigade, while the two VBs of the Royal Scots Fusiliers joined the existing Scottish Border Brigade.

== External sources ==
- Ubique.com
