= Sir Thomas Montgomery-Cuninghame, 10th Baronet =

British Army officer (1877–1945)

Sir Thomas Montgomery-Cuninghame, Bt DSO
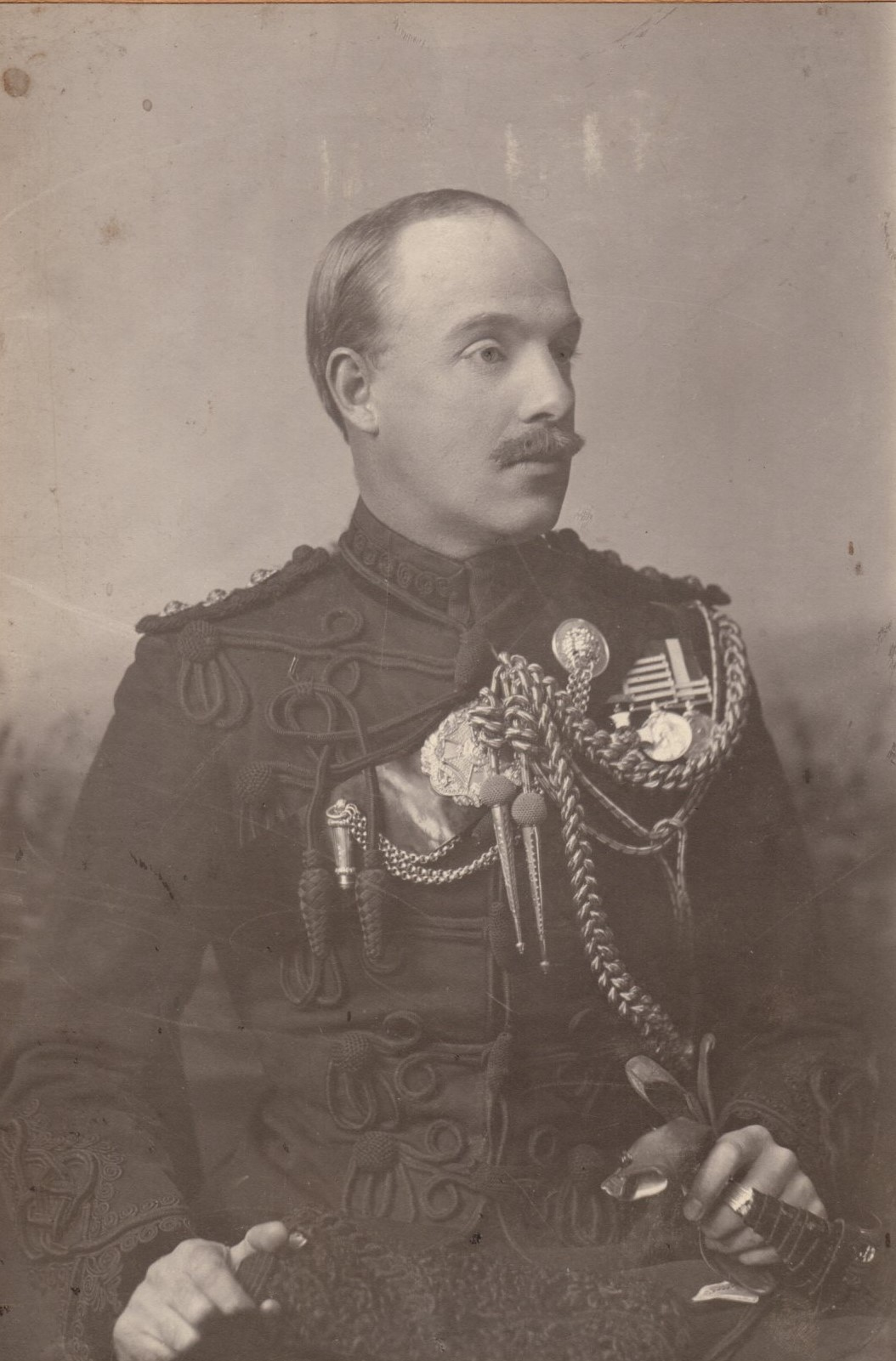
- Photograph of Sir Thomas
- Born: Thomas Andrew Alexander Montgomery-Cuninghame; 30 March 1877; London
- Died: 5 January 1945 (aged 67); Willards Hill, Etchingham, Sussex
- Education: Sandroyd School; Eton College
- Alma mater: Royal Military Academy Sandhurst
- Spouse(s): Alice Frances Denison Des Vœux (m. 1904; div. 1925) Nancy Macaulay Foggo (after 1925)
- Children: Alexander Montgomery-Cuninghame; Pamela Underwood; Sir William Montgomery-Cuninghame, 11th Baronet; Sir John Montgomery-Cuninghame, 12th Baronet

Sir Thomas Andrew Alexander Montgomery-Cuninghame, 10th Baronet (30 March 1877 – 5 January 1945), was a British Army officer and Distinguished Service Order recipient.

== Early life ==
Montgomery-Cuninghame was born on 30 March 1877 in London, the sixth child, and eldest son, of Elizabeth Hartopp and Sir William Montgomery-Cuninghame, 9th Baronet. His eldest sister, Edith Honoria, married Sir John Tilley in 1901.

His paternal grandparents were Sir Thomas Montgomery-Cuninghame, 8th Baronet, and the former Charlotte Niven Doig Hutcheson (only child of Hugh Hutcheson of Southfield, Renfrewshire). His mother was the youngest child of Edward Bourchier Hartopp, MP for North Leicestershire, and the former Honoria Gent (a daughter of Maj.-Gen. William Gent).

He was educated at Sandroyd School, Eton College (where he served with the Eton Volunteers), and then entered Sandhurst although he had not expected to pass the entrance exams.

== Career ==
On the death of his father in 1897, he became the 10th Baronet of Corsehill.

=== Military service ===
Gentleman Cadet Montgomery-Cuninghame left the Royal Military College on 17 February 1897 and, following in his father's footsteps, joining The Rifle Brigade (The Prince Consort's Own) as a second lieutenant. Although his father was already very ill, he accepted a 12-month posting to Singapore.

Upon his return he was quartered at Parkhurst Military Barracks, Isle of Wight. While teaching the princes of Battenburg the art of signalling, he contracted scarlet fever resulting in the immediate departure of the princes, and a seal being placed on the gate of barracks while Montgomery-Cuninghame recovered.

=== Boer War: 1899–1902 ===
The 1st Battalion Rifle Brigade was one of the first to be mobilised at the outbreak of the Boer War and, within a week, they were at war strength. From Parkhurst, they marched to Cowes, were ferried to Southampton and then by SS German to Cape Town. At the age of 20, Montgomery-Cuninghame was serving in the Boer War as a lieutenant with the 1st Battalion, Rifle Brigade. He was present at the relief of Ladysmith, including action at Colenso between 17 and 24 January 1900, where the Rifle Brigade lost 1,000 men. Between 5 and 7 February, he was in the action from the Brakfontein trenches during the advance on Vaal Krantz. The Rifle Brigade were supporting the 2nd Durham Light Infantry under heavy fire from the hill. At Vaal Krantz, the Rifles led the attack; Montgomery-Cuninghame was severely wounded in the leg from a bursting pom-pom shell. This wound severed a vein or artery under his knee and was to alter the course of his military career.

He was twice mentioned in despatches. In 1901, at the age of 23, Montgomery-Cuninghame was awarded the Distinguished Service Order.

After treatment at Maritzburg and recuperation at Durban, he rejoined his colleagues after the battle at Ladysmith but, due to the residual damage from the injury, found he was unfit for marching any distance. Consequently, he was offered a post as a Brigade Signalling Officer with the 4th Infantry Brigade. This period saw Montgomery-Cuninghame posted to Heidelberg, Gauteng, where Lord Herbert Kitchener directly entrusted him with a secret mission to the Queen of Swaziland who, subsequently named him Cibidela, meaning "He who puts things right between her & Lord Kitchener." He then had a posting at Barberton where one of his duties was to look after and train carrier pigeons.

=== Between armed conflict: 1902–1914 ===
At the end of the war, Montgomery-Cuninghame was posted to Pretoria, working in intelligence. However, he was evacuated unconscious to Chatham, having contracted enteric fever (typhoid fever). He remained at Chatham until 1906 when he returned to Sandhurst. While riding through Bagshot, his horse bolted and he was thrown and fractured his skull.

In 1907, he was posted back to the 1st Rifle Brigade and Holywood, Belfast, Ireland. He remained in Ireland for five years. Thom's Official Directory shows him as a Staff Captain, Curragh Camp, Kildare, Ireland in 1910 and the 1911 Irish census shows him still in Kildare, living with his wife, son and daughter in Ballyfair (Ballysax, West Kildare), whereas other sources state he was the Deputy Assistant Quartermaster General, 5th Division Irish Cmd between 1909 and 1912. In the spring of 1912 he was posted to the 3rd Battalion Rifle Brigade at Tipperary, but he was not to remain there.

By the summer of 1912, he had taken over the position of Military Attaché from Major Eardly-Russell at Vienna, Austria, and Cetinje, Albania. where he was based at the British Embassy in the Metternich Gasse. There, he was tasked with gathering intelligence and reporting on the personal and political complications, intrigues and allegiances involving Austria, Germany, Bulgaria, Romania, Albania, Montenegro, Serbia, Hungary, Bosnia and Herzegovina and Russia.

=== First World War: 1914–1918 ===
The outbreak of the war saw Montgomery-Cuninghame moved to Paris where he continued his intelligence role with the 1st Rifle Brigade, travelling to a number of countries. Eager to leave intelligence and become an "ordinary soldier" again, he swapped roles with Major Christopher Thomson, 1st Baron Thomson, and served with the 1st Corps at Hazebrouck under Sir Douglas Haig. However, his wish was not to be fulfilled and in February 1915, he travelled to London, where the War Office instructed him to leave at once for Athens with the express purpose of “helping the British Minister to get the Greeks on our side”.

=== Post-armistice: 1918–1924 ===
At the end of World War I, Montgomery-Cuninghame returned to Vienna as Head of the British Military Mission. 1920 saw him leave Vienna for Prague on a military mission. Between 1920 and 1923 he was the Military Attaché to Vienna and Prague. Colonel Montgomery-Cuninghame retired on retirement pay on 18 August 1924.

After his distinguished military career, he became the Director of European Motorways.

== Personal life ==
On 1 November 1904 at St Peter's Church, Eaton Square, London, he married Alice Frances Denison Des Vœux daughter of Sir William Des Vœux, former governor of Hong Kong, and Marion Denison (née Pender). Before their divorce in 1925, they were the parents of two children, a son and a daughter:

- Alexander William Henry James Montgomery-Cuninghame (1905–1944), a Lieutenant Colonel in the Royal Scots Fusiliers, and also a DSO recipient, died in World War II in France; he married Barbara Susanne Gray-Cheape, daughter of Col. Hugh Annesley Gray-Cheape and Carsina Gordon Gray, in 1934.
- Pamela Richenda Cubitt Montgomery-Cuninghame (1910–1978), who became a noted florist and ran a plant nursery; she married Thomas Abdy Combe, a son of John Abdy Combe, in 1932. They divorced in 1941 and she married Desmond FitzGerald Underwood, a son of Charles Frederick Weston Underwood, in 1942.

They divorced in 1925 and his former wife remarried Sir Aubrey Symonds. Sir Thomas then married Nancy Macaulay Foggo of British Columbia on 24 November 1925 in London, daughter of William Stewart Foggo and Flora Alexandra née Macaulay, with whom he had two more sons.

- Sir William Andrew Malcolm Martin Oliphant Montgomery-Cuninghame, 11th Baronet (1929–1959), who married Sara Carolyn Gordon-Lennox, daughter of Brig.-Gen. Lord Esmé Gordon-Lennox (second son of the 7th Duke of Richmond) and Rosamond Lorys Palmer, in 1956.
- Sir John Christopher Foggo Montgomery Cuninghame, 12th Baronet (b. 1935), who married Laura Nicholson, the second daughter of Sir Godfrey Nicholson, 1st Baronet, MP for Morpeth and Farnham, and the former Lady Katharine Lindsay (a daughter of the 27th Earl of Crawford), in 1964.

Montgomery-Cuninghame died 5 January 1945 in Willards Hill, Etchingham, Sussex, and the funeral service took place at St. Mary's Church, Salehurst, East Sussex. He is commemorated on a window in Kirkmichael Parish Church, Ayrshire. As he was predeceased by his eldest son, he was succeeded in the baronetcy by his second son, William. After his death in 1959 without issue, the baronetcy passed to his youngest son, John.

== Military awards ==
- Distinguished Service Order (DSO)
- King's South Africa Medal with Clasp awarded 1 November 1902
- Legion of Honour Conferred by the President of the French Republic, Commandeur on 11 July 1919
- Distinguished Service Medal (U.S. Army) Conferred by the President of the United States of America on 12 July 1919
- The Croix de Guerre Conferred by the Government of the Czechoslovak Republic 29 March 1922
- Military Order of Maria Theresa Medal, Austria
- Grand Cross Order of George I, Greece
- Order of the Redeemer, Greece

== Autobiography ==
- Montgomery-Cuninghame, Thomas: Dusty Measure. A Record of troubled Times, London, John Murray, 1936.

Baronetage of Nova Scotia
Preceded by William Montgomery-Cuninghame	Baronet of Corsehill; 1897–1945	Succeeded by William Montgomery-Cuninghame
