= 196th (2/1st Highland Light Infantry) Brigade =

- Active: 1915–1918
- Country: United Kingdom
- Branch: Territorial Army
- Type: Infantry
- Size: Brigade
- Part of: 65th (2nd Lowland) Division
- Engagements: World War I

The 196th (2/1st Highland Light Infantry) Brigade was an infantry brigade of the British Army raised during the Great War in 1914. The brigade was formed as a 2nd Line of the 157th (Highland Light Infantry) Brigade and assigned to the 65th (2nd Lowland) Division, itself formed as a 2nd Line of the 52nd (Lowland) Division. The brigade was composed of four 2nd Line battalions of the Highland Light Infantry and remained in the United Kingdom throughout the war.

== Origin ==
The units and formations of the Territorial Force were mobilised on the outbreak of war on 4 August 1914. Almost immediately, they were invited to volunteer for Overseas Service. On 15 August, the War Office issued instructions to separate those men who had signed up for Home Service only, and form them into reserve units. On 31 August, the formation of a reserve or 2nd Line unit was authorised for each 1st Line unit where 60 per cent or more of the men had volunteered for Overseas Service. The titles of these 2nd Line units would be the same as the original, but distinguished by a '2/' prefix. The large numbers of volunteers coming forward were assigned to these 2nd Line units for training. Later, the Home Service men were separated into provisional units, while the 2nd Line continued to train drafts for the 1st Line serving overseas.

== Order of battle ==
The brigade's initial composition was as follows:

- 2/5th Battalion, Highland Light Infantry
- 2/6th Battalion, Highland Light Infantry
- 2/7th (Blythswood) Battalion, Highland Light Infantry
- 2/9th (Glasgow Highland) Battalion, Highland Light Infantry

=== Reorganisation ===
In November 1915 the units of 65th (2nd L) Division were reorganised and the battalions numbered sequentially. At this time 196th Bde was composed as follows:

- No 21 Battalion (2/5th Highland Light Infantry)
- No 22 Battalion (2/6th Highland Light Infantry)
- No 23 Battalion (2/7th Highland Light Infantry)
- No 24 Battalion (2/9th Highland Light Infantry)

=== Later war ===
In January 1916 the composite battalions returned to their original regiments:

- 2/5th Bn HLI – disbanded May 1918
- 2/6th Bn HLI – disbanded May 1918
- 2/7th BnHLI – disbanded 30 July 1917
- 2/9th Bn HLI – disbanded May 1918
- 221st Graduated Bn, Training Reserve – joined 30 July 1917; became 52nd (Graduated) Bn, Cheshire Regiment October 1917; remained at the Curragh after March 1918

== Service ==
The brigade was formed in January 1915, but progressive training of the 2nd Line units was hampered by the need to provide frequent reinforcement drafts to the 1st Line, by the lack of up-to-date arms and equipment, and the reorganisation when Home Service men were drafted to separate units. By August 1915, 65th (2nd L) Division had concentrated round Bridge of Allan, with 196th Bde at Dunfermline, where it remained until March 1916. In that month the division moved to Essex, where it joined Southern Army (Home Forces), with 196th Bde at Danbury and Wyndham Mortimer.

Early in 1917 the division was sent to Ireland to relieve 59th (2nd North Midland) Division, which had been based there since the Easter Rising of 1916. 196th Brigade was dispersed to the Curragh (2/5th 2/6th and 2/9th Bns), Galway and Naas (2/7th Bn). In August the battalions at the Curragh moved to Dublin, but 2/5th and 2/6th Bns returned to the Curragh in November.

65th (2nd Lowland) Division and its brigades were disbanded on 18 March 1918.

== Commanders ==
The following officers commanded the brigade:

- Colonel Lord Saltoun, 15 January 1915
- Brigadier-General H.F. Kays, 15 March 1916 (sick 1 June –18 August 1916)
- Lieutenant-Colonel G. McNish, acting 1 June–18 August 1916
