= Sir William Montgomery-Cuninghame, 9th Baronet =

Colonel Sir William Montgomery-Cuninghame Bt VC DL JP
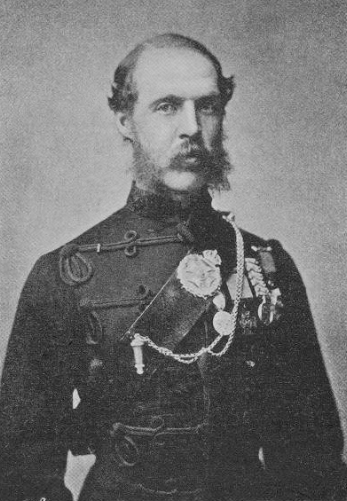

Member of Parliament for Ayr Burghs
- In office 1874–1880
- Preceded by: Edward Craufurd
- Succeeded by: Richard Campbell

Personal details
- Born: 20 May 1834 Maybole, South Ayrshire, Scotland
- Died: 11 November 1897 (aged 63) Gunton, Suffolk, England
- Spouse: Elizabeth Hartopp (after 1869)
- Parent(s): Sir Thomas Montgomery-Cuninghame, 8th Baronet; Charlotte Niven Doig Hutcheson
- Education: Harrow School
- Awards: Victoria Cross, Order of the Medjidie, Turkish Crimea Medal

Military service
- Branch/service: British Army
- Rank: Colonel
- Unit: Rifle Brigade; Royal Scots Fusiliers
- Battles/wars: Crimean War

Sir William James Montgomery-Cuninghame, 9th Baronet VC JP DL (20 May 1834 – 11 November 1897) was a British Army officer from Scotland, Conservative politician and Victoria Cross recipient.

== Early life ==
Montgomery-Cuninghame was born in Ayr to Sir Thomas Montgomery-Cuninghame, 8th Baronet of Corsehill and Charlotte Niven Doig Hutcheson, the eldest of seven children.

His paternal grandparents were Sir James Montgomery-Cuninghame, 6th Baronet and Janet Cuming (a daughter of Edinburgh banker Thomas Cuming, Esq., of Earnside, Nairnshire and Hatton, Cheshire). His mother was the only child of Hugh Hutcheson of Southfield, Renfrewshire.

Between April 1849 and 1851 he was educated at Harrow School.

== Career ==
Montgomery-Cuninghame had a long and distinguished military career, which began in 1853 when, on 11 March 1853, he became ensign in the 1st Regiment (by purchase). By 29 April 1853 he had become a second lieutenant in the Rifle Brigade.

=== Crimean War ===
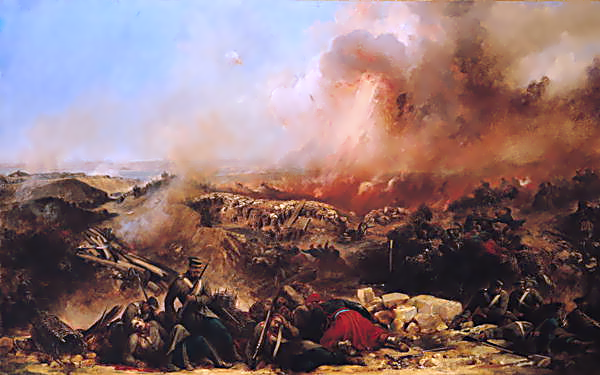
Depiction of the Siege of Sebastopol

In October 1853, the Crimean War broke out and he was present at the battles of Alma, Balaclava, Inkerman and the siege and fall of Sebastapol. He served in the Crimean War as a lieutenant in the 1st Battalion, The Rifle Brigade (Prince Consort's Own). On 20 November 1854 at Sebastopol, the Crimea, he, with another lieutenant (Claud Thomas Bourchier) was with a party detailed to drive the Russians from some rifle pits. Advancing on the pits after dark, they launched a surprise attack and drove the Russian riflemen from their cover, but, in the fierce fighting which ensued, the officer in command of the party was killed. The two lieutenants, however, maintained their advantage, withstood all attacks from the enemy during the night and held the position until relieved next day. For their actions they were subsequently awarded the Victoria Cross.

He was mentioned in Lord Raglan's despatches and "his bravery elicited the admiration of General Canrobert, who instantly published an order expressive of his approbation." Montgomery-Cuninghame was one of the earliest recipients of the Victoria Cross. His Victoria Cross is displayed at the Royal Green Jackets Museum, Winchester, England. During the Crimean conflict, he was also awarded the Order of the Medjidie 5th Class and the Turkish Crimea Medal

=== Later military career ===
After the end of the Crimean War, on 22 November 1856, Montgomery-Cuninghame held the rank of captain and became an instructor of musketry at the Rifle Brigade He was still serving in the military when on 14 August 1867, he was promoted to major half pay by purchase

Nine months later, on 22 May 1868, he was appointed lieutenant colonel of the Inns of Court Rifle Volunteer Corps In 1877, he was a major with the Ayr and Wigtown Militia. On 9 August 1884, Major Montgomery Cuninghame was granted the honorary rank of lieutenant colonel in the 4th Battalion, Royal Scots Fusiliers. On 17 October 1888 he was granted the rank of colonel in the Volunteer Force and placed in command of The Clyde Brigade. He also held the appointment of brigadier general of the Clyde Brigade and then of the Glasgow Brigade of the Volunteer Force.

In July 1897, he was expected to accompany the Volunteer Glasgow Infantry Brigade (which he had commanded since its inception) to Aldershot, where they were to perform duties akin to regular battalions stationed there. This was the first time in the history of the volunteer movement this was to occur. However, during the negotiations for this historic event, he resigned due to ill health.

=== Political career ===
On 28 August 1871 Montgomery-Cuninghame was commissioned as Deputy Lieutenant of Ayrshire.

He sat as Conservative Member of Parliament for Ayr Burghs from 31 January 1874 to 31 March 1880.

He was a Justice of the Peace for the counties of Lanark and Wigtown.

== Personal life ==
On 22 April 1869 at Little Dalby, Leicestershire, he married Elizabeth Hartopp, a daughter of Edward Bourchier Hartopp, MP for North Leicestershire, and Honoria Gent (a daughter of Maj.-Gen. William Gent). Together, they had nine children, two sons and seven daughters, including:

- Edith Honoria Montgomery-Cuninghame (1870–1949), who married diplomat Sir John Tilley.
- Lilian Margaret Montgomery-Cuninghame (1871–1871), who died young.
- Marjory Eva Charlotte Montgomery-Cuninghame (1873–1952)
- Elizabeth Montgomery-Cuninghame (1874–1874), who died young.
- Violet Jessie Montgomery-Cuninghame (1876–1947)
- Sir Thomas Andrew Alexander Montgomery-Cuninghame, 10th Baronet (1877–1945), who married Alice Frances Denison Des Voeux, daughter of Sir George William Des Voeux, in 1904. They divorced in 1925 and he married Nancy Macaulay Foggo, daughter of W. Stewart Foggo, in 1925.
- Edward William Montgomery-Cuninghame (1878–1935), a Lt.-Col. in the Royal Artillery; he married Mary Stewart, daughter of James Stewart, in 1909.
- Letitia Margaret Montgomery-Cuninghame (1880–1880), who died young.
- Bridget Anne Montgomery-Cuninghame (1886–1960), who married Capt. Henry Gilbert Smith-Rewse.

Montgomery-Cuninghame became the 9th Baronet of Corsehill on the death of his father on 30 August 1870.

He died on 11 November 1897, aged 63 at Gunton Old Hall, Lowestoft, Suffolk after a period of ill health. He was buried in Kirkmichael Churchyard, Ayr with his wife, where a window commemorates him.

Parliament of the United Kingdom
Preceded by Edward Craufurd	Member of Parliament for Ayr Burghs; 1874–1880	Succeeded by Richard Campbell
Baronetage of Nova Scotia
Preceded by Thomas Montgomery-Cuninghame	Baronet (of Corsehill); 1870–1897	Succeeded by Thomas Montgomery-Cuninghame
