= Sir Amherst Selby-Bigge, 1st Baronet =

British civil servant, barrister and scholar

Sir Amherst Selby-Bigge, 1st Baronet KCB JP
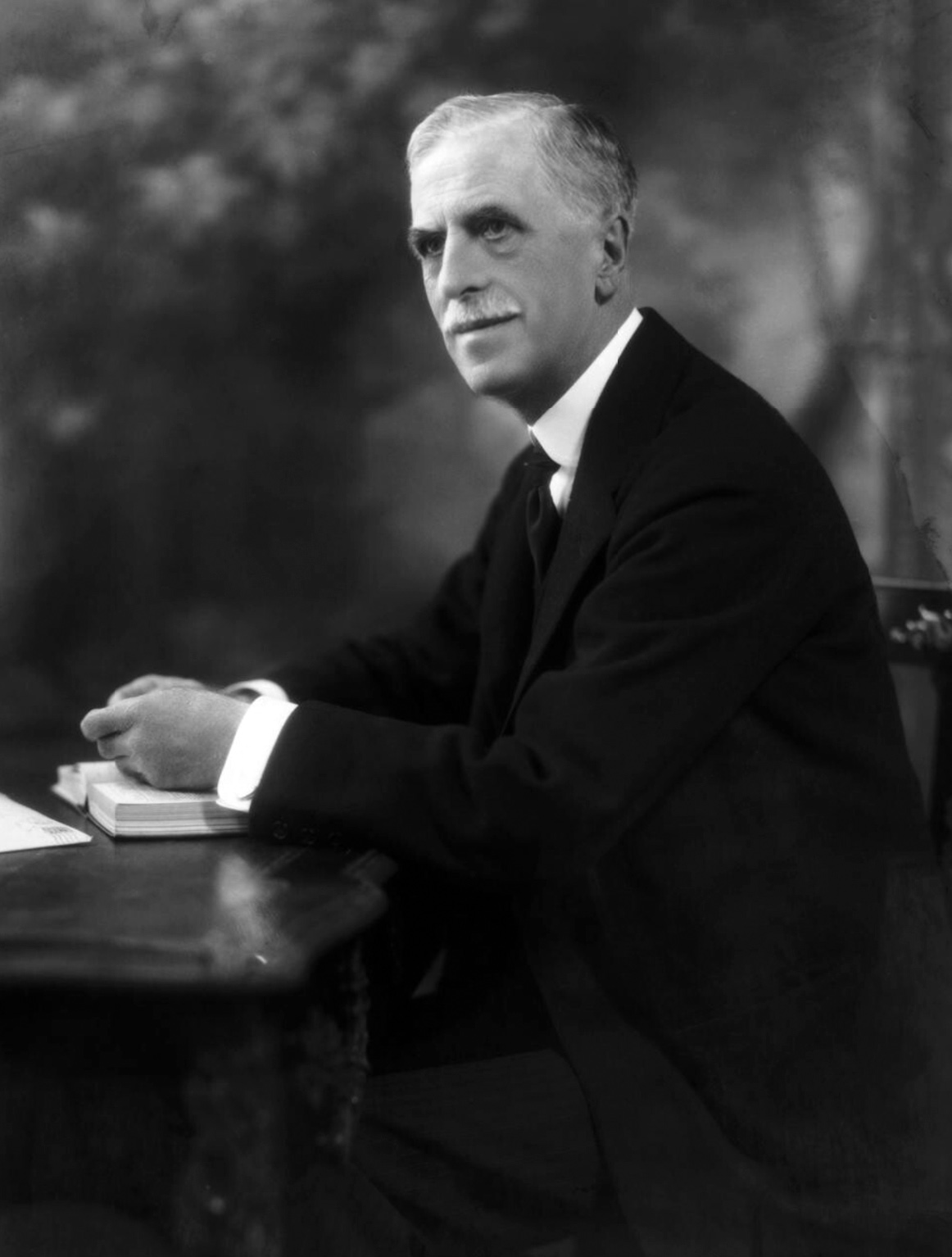
- Sir Amherst in 1924

Permanent Secretary at the Board of Education
- In office 1911–1925
- Preceded by: Sir Robert Morant
- Succeeded by: Sir Aubrey Symonds

Personal details
- Born: Lewis Amherst Selby-Bigge; 3 April 1860 Beckenham, Kent, England
- Died: 24 May 1951 (aged 91) Lewes, Sussex, England
- Party: Unionist Party
- Spouse: Edith Lindsay Davison (m. 1886)
- Relations: J. R. Davison (father-in-law); James Bowes-Lyon (grandson)
- Children: 3
- Education: Winchester College
- Alma mater: Christ Church, Oxford (B.A., 1883); University College, Oxford (M.A., 1886)
- Occupation: Civil servant

Sir Lewis Amherst Selby-Bigge, 1st Baronet KCB JP (3 April 1860 – 24 May 1951) was a British civil servant, barrister, and scholar who was Permanent Secretary at the Board of Education between 1911–1925.

== Early life and education ==
Selby-Bigge was born at Oakwood House in Beckenham, Kent, the second son of Charles Selby Bigge JP, of Longhorsley, Northumberland, and Katharina Ogle.

He was educated at Winchester College, followed by Christ Church, Oxford, where he earned a B.A. in 1883 with first-class honours in Literae humaniores. He was elected a Fellow of University College, Oxford in 1883 and was a tutor in philosophy for several years. He published multiple works on the doctrines of British moralists and edited their works, including David Hume's A Treatise of Human Nature and An Enquiry Concerning Human Understanding, with full index. He earned an M.A. from University College in 1886.

== Career ==
Selby-Bigge was called to the Bar at the Inner Temple in 1891. Three years later, he began his career in the civil service as Assistant Charity Commissioner (1894–1902), before joining the Board of Education, serving successively as Assistant Secretary (1903–07), Principal Assistant Secretary (1907–11) and Permanent Secretary (1911–25). Reading law proved to be greatly beneficial in his future work researching legislation for the Board, such as the Education Act 1902 and the Education Act 1918.

According to his obituary,

[Selby-Bigge] made his way through a highly controversial atmosphere with assurance and tact, and his legal training enabled him to clarify the maze of trusts set up under the old system and to bring order into a chaotic situation.

— The Times, 25 May 1951

He was appointed a Companion of the Order of the Bath (CB) in 1905 and promoted to Knight Commander in the same order (KCB) in the 1913 New Year Honours.

In the 1919 New Year Honours, Sir Amherst was created a baronet, of King's Sutton, in the Baronetage of the United Kingdom, effective 14 February 1919. The title became extinct after the death of his only son, John, an artist, in 1973.

In the 1929 general election, he unsuccessfully stood for the Combined English Universities constituency as Unionist Party candidate.

== Personal life ==
On 15 September 1886, Selby-Bigge married Edith Lindsay Davison, OBE, daughter of late Right Hon. John Robert Davison, QC MP. They had one son and two daughters:

- Sir John Amherst Selby-Bigge, 2nd Baronet, OBE (24 June 1892 – 3 October 1973)
- Evelyn Mary Selby-Bigge (16 October 1887), married Capt. Henry Cecil Pember, son of Henry George Pember
- Edith Katharine Selby-Bigge (31 March 1889), married Capt. Geoffrey Francis Bowes-Lyon, grandson of 13th Earl and Countess of Strathmore and Kinghorne and first cousin of Queen Elizabeth The Queen Mother, was the mother of:
  - Sir James Bowes-Lyon (1917–1977), 2nd cousin of Queen Elizabeth II

Sir Amherst died in Lewes, Sussex in 1951.

== Bibliography ==
- Hume, David (1894). Selby-Bigge, Sir L. A. (ed.). An Enquiry Concerning Human Understanding. Oxford: Clarendon Press.
- Hume, David (1897). Selby-Bigge, Sir L. A. (ed.). A Treatise of Human Nature. Oxford: Clarendon Press.
- Selby-Bigge, Sir L. A., ed. (1897). British moralists, being selections from writers principally of the eighteenth century. Oxford: Clarendon Press.
- Selby-Bigge, Sir L. A., ed. (1897). British philosophy 1600–1900. Oxford: Clarendon Press.
- Selby-Bigge, Sir L. A. (1934). The Board of Education. London: Putnam.

Government offices
Preceded by Sir Robert Morant	Permanent Secretary of the Board of Education; 1911–1925	Succeeded by Sir Aubrey Symonds
Baronetage of the United Kingdom
New title	Baronet (of King's Sutton); 1919–1951	Succeeded by John Selby-Bigge
