= 35th Street =

35th Street may refer to:

- 35th Street (Manhattan), New York City
- 35th Street Bridge, Charleston, West Virginia
