= 35th Division =

35th Division or 35th Infantry Division may refer to:

== Infantry divisions ==
- 35th Division (German Empire)
- 35th Reserve Division, German Empire
- 35th Infantry Division (Wehrmacht), Germany
- 35th SS-Police Grenadier Division, Germany
- 35th Division (Imperial Japanese Army)
- 35th Infantry Division (Poland)
- 35th Infantry Division (Russian Empire)
- 35th Guards Motor Rifle Division, Soviet Union
- 35th Guards Rifle Division, Soviet Union
- 35th Motor Rifle Division, Soviet Union
- 35th Rifle Division, Soviet Union
- 35th Division (Spain)
- 35th Division (United Kingdom)
- 35th Infantry Division (United States)
- 35th Division (Yugoslav Partisans)

== Other divisions ==
- 35th Anti-Aircraft Artillery Division, Soviet Union
- 35th Rocket Division, Soviet Union and Russia
- 35th Tank Division, Soviet Union
- 35th Air Division, United States

== See also ==
- List of military divisions by number
- 35th Army (disambiguation)
- XXV Corps (disambiguation)
- 35th Brigade (disambiguation)
- 35th Regiment (disambiguation)
- 35th Battalion (disambiguation)
- 35th Squadron (disambiguation)
