= Glasgow Highlanders =

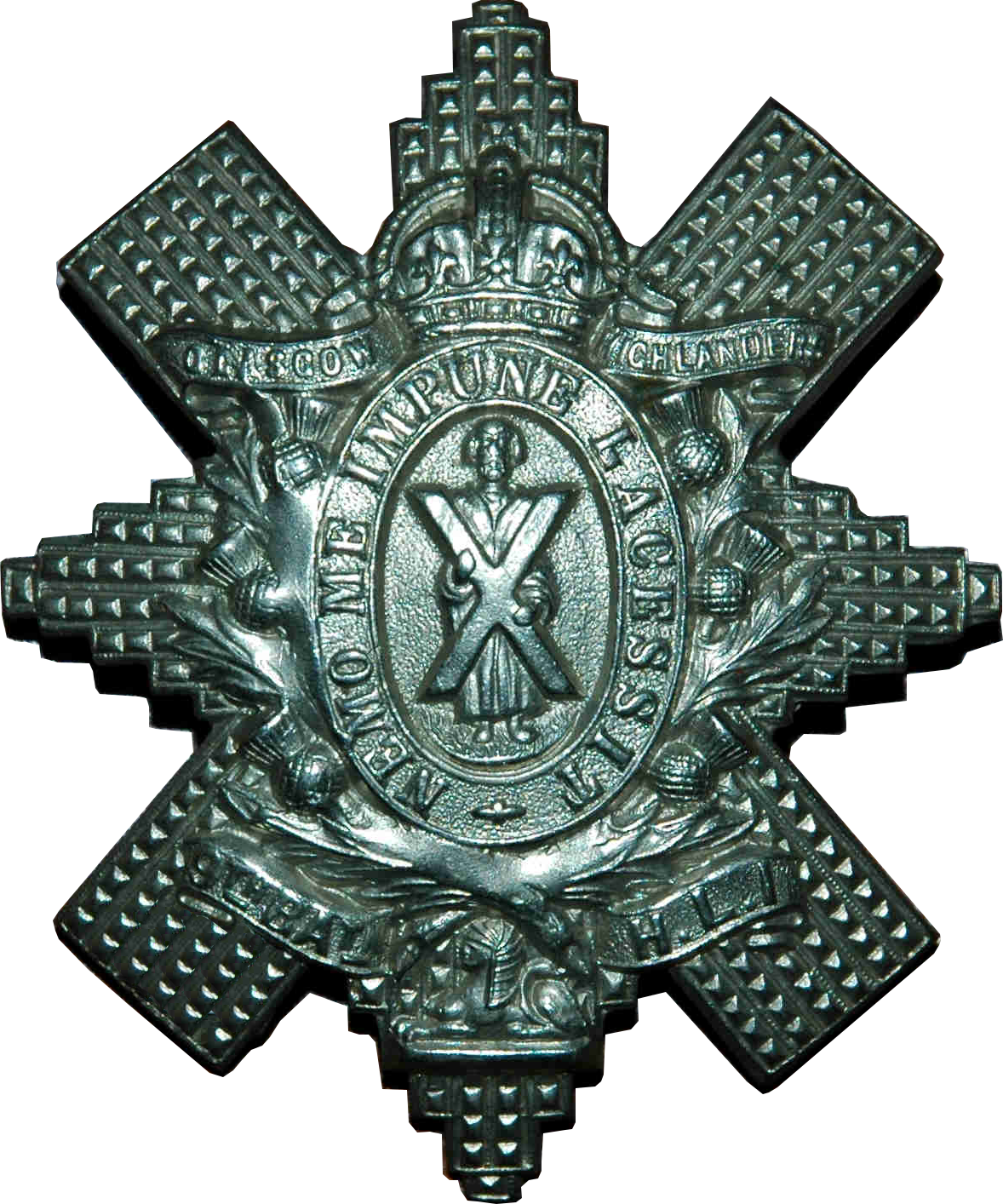
- Cap Badge of the Glasgow Highlanders
- Active: 1868–1973
- Country: United Kingdom
- Branch: Territorial Army
- Type: Infantry
- Role: Line infantry
- Part of: Lanarkshire Rifle Volunteers 1868–1881; Highland Light Infantry 1881–1959; Royal Highland Fusiliers (Princess Margaret's Own Glasgow and Ayrshire Regiment) 1959–1967; 52nd Lowland Volunteers 1967–1973
- Garrison/HQ: Greendyke Street, Glasgow
- Motto: Nemo Me Impune Lacessit (No One Assails Me With Impunity) (Latin)
- March: Quick – Highland Laddie
- Engagements: Battle of Modder River; Battle of Festubert; Battle of Loos; Battle of the Somme; Battle of Arras; Battle of Passchendaele; Battle of Normandy; Battle of the Scheldt; Operation Plunder

Insignia
- Tartan: MacKenzie Tartan

The Glasgow Highlanders was a former infantry regiment of the British Army, part of the Territorial Force, later renamed the Territorial Army. The regiment eventually became a Volunteer Battalion of the Highland Light Infantry (City of Glasgow Regiment) in 1881. The regiment saw active service in both World War I and World War II. In 1959 the Highland Light Infantry (City of Glasgow Regiment) was amalgamated with the Royal Scots Fusiliers to form the Royal Highland Fusiliers (Princess Margaret's Own Glasgow and Ayrshire Regiment). The Glasgow Highlanders was later amalgamated into the 52nd Lowland Volunteers in 1967.

== History ==
The regiment was originally formed as the 105th Lanarkshire Rifle Volunteers, also known as the Glasgow Highland Regiment, which was formed in 1868 by a group of Highland migrants to Glasgow as part of the civilian Volunteer Force and initially wore the uniform and based its cap badge upon that of the Black Watch (Royal Highland Regiment). It consisted of 12 companies.

Most of the Rifle Volunteer Corps (RVCs) had been raised following an invasion scare in 1859–60, so the 105th was a latecomer but it had the advantage of a cadre of experienced Volunteers when 187 Highlanders transferred to the new unit from G, H and I Companies of the 4th (Glasgow, 1st Northern) Lanarkshire RVC. These companies had been raised as kilted units in 1860 as the 60th (Glasgow, 1st Highland), 61st (Glasgow, 2nd Highland) and 93rd (Glasgow Highland Rangers) Lanarkshire RVCs. (After the Highlanders left the three companies of the 4th adopted tunics and trews instead of doublets and kilts.)

Although the 105th recruited generally across Glasgow, C Company was from Partick, E Company from Crosshill, F Company was formed by natives of Islay and G Company by those from Argyllshire. The headquarters (HQ) and drill hall was at 97 Union Street, Glasgow, later at Greendyke Street near Glasgow Green, and then at 13 Dundas Street, with a rifle range of Patterton.

When the RVCs were consolidated in 1880, the battalion was renumbered as the 10th (Glasgow Highland) Lanarkshire RVC. Under the 'Localisation of Forces' scheme introduced in 1872 by the Cardwell reforms, the unit had been grouped with the 73rd (Perthshire) Regiment of Foot, the 90th Regiment of Foot (Perthshire Volunteers) and the 2nd Royal Lanark Militia in Brigade No 60. However, this affiliation was broken up in the Childers Reforms, under which the Lanarkshire Rifle Volunteers eventually became volunteer battalions of either the Highland Light Infantry (HLI) or the Cameronians (Scottish Rifles). The 10th (Glasgow Highland) became a volunteer battalion of the HLI on 1 July 1881 and was formally redesignated as the 5th (Glasgow Highland) Volunteer Battalion, Highland Light Infantry in December 1887.

The personnel were distinctive because they continued to wear their kilts in contrast to the rest of the HLI, who wore trews. The 5th Battalion, always wore the Government (Black Watch) tartan and their own cap badge, and never wore the Mackenzie tartan as the rest of the HLI.

The Stanhope Memorandum of December 1888 introduced a Mobilisation Scheme for Volunteer units, which would assemble in their own brigades at key points in case of war. In peacetime these brigades provided a structure for collective training. Under this scheme the Volunteer Battalions of the HLI were included in the Clyde Brigade, later the Glasgow Brigade based at Hamilton. In 1902 the HLI battalions split from the rest of the Glasgow units to form their own Highland Light Infantry Brigade, still based at Hamilton.

A Cadet Corps at Blairlodge School, Polmont, Stirlingshire, was affiliated to the battalion from 1891 to 1904. The battalion added a cyclist company in 1900. At this period, A Company was recruited from Springburn, B Company from Whiteinch, C from Partick, E from Queen's Park, F from Islay and M from Hillhead.

Detachments were sent to South Africa during the Second Boer War and earned the battalion its first battle honour, for service on the Modder River.

=== Territorial Force and the Great War ===
When the Volunteers were subsumed into the new Territorial Force (TF) under the Haldane Reforms of 1908, the unit became the 9th (Glasgow Highland) Battalion, Highland Light Infantry. By now the battalion was back at 81 Greendyke Street. It continued to be part of the Highland Light Infantry Brigade, now part of the Lowland Division in the TF. In 1915, the division would become the 52nd (Lowland) Division and the brigade the 157th (Highland Light Infantry) Brigade respectively.

During the Great War of 1914–18 another two home-based battalions were recruited, which were used to supply manpower to the 1st Battalion in France, who served with distinction with the Highland Light Infantry under the 2nd Division at the battles of Festubert and Loos. In May 1916 the battalion was transferred to the 33rd Division and fought at the Somme (at High Wood), Arras and the Third Battle of Ypres. After the end of the war, the Glasgow Highlanders were disbanded along with the rest of the Territorial Force. The story of the battalion in the Great War would later be dramatised in the 1995 Bill Bryden play, The Big Picnic, starring Jimmy Logan.

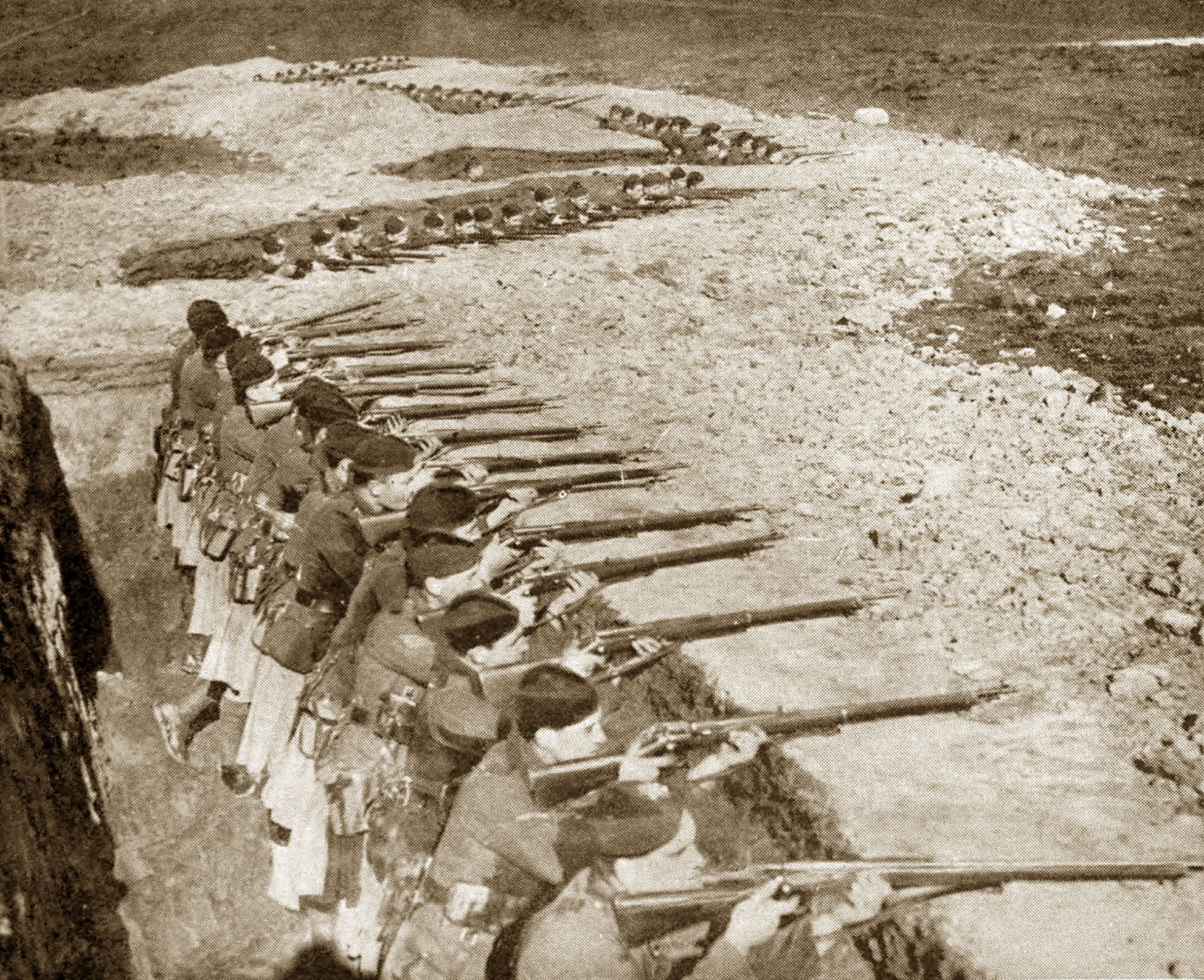
Glasgow Highlanders training in trench warfare. A striking photograph giving an excellent idea of the lay of a line of trenches. It will be seen that trenches can only be taken in sections; it is not a question of wresting a trench from the enemy and enfilading hundreds of yards of front with machine-guns. The zigzag construction necessitates the use of hand-grenades to dislodge occupants from each section in turn.

=== Territorial Army and the Second World War ===
In 1920, the Territorial Force was re-established as the Territorial Army, and the Glasgow Highlanders re-raised a single battalion. It later moved to a new Headquarters, (in what became known as Walcheren Barracks) in Maryhill in 1935.

Still part of the 157th Infantry Brigade of 52nd (Lowland) Infantry Division, the 1st Battalion was sent overseas to France in 1940 as part of the Second British Expeditionary Force (see Operation Aerial) to cover the withdrawal of the BEF being evacuated from Dunkirk. With the rest of the division, the 1st Battalion spent the next four years training in the United Kingdom and, from May 1942 until June 1944, was trained in mountain warfare and later in airlanding operations. In early October 1944 the 52nd Division was sent to Belgium, coming under command of the First Canadian Army, and saw service most notably during the capture of Walcheren Island during the Battle of the Scheldt.

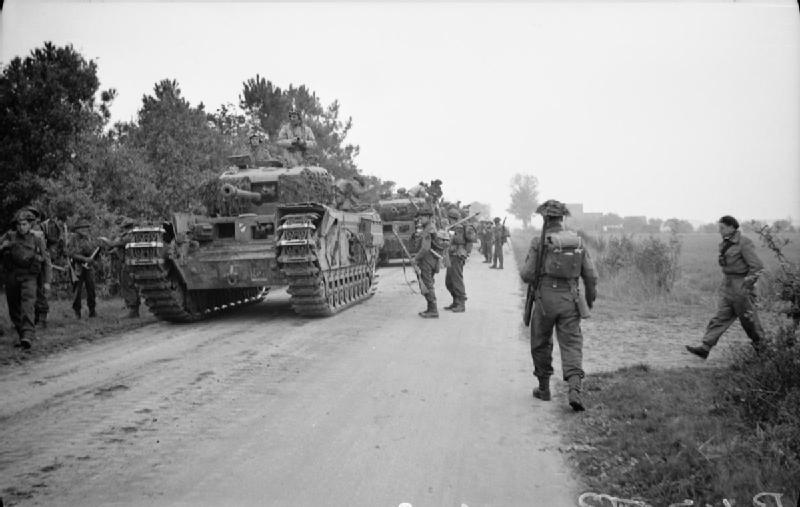
Infantrymen of the 2nd Battalion, Glasgow Highlanders, 15th (Scottish) Division, with Churchill tanks of the 6th Guards Tank Brigade, near Moergestel, 26 October 1944.

In the spring and summer of 1939, the Territorial Army was ordered to be doubled in size, in order to meet the threat of Nazi Germany. As a result, the 1st Battalion raised a duplicate unit, the 2nd Battalion which was assigned to the 46th (Highland) Infantry Brigade, 15th (Scottish) Infantry Division. With the division, the 2nd Battalion remained in the United Kingdom until it was sent overseas, to France, in June 1944. The battalion fought in the Battle of Normandy in Operation Epsom and the Second Battle of the Odon, followed by Operation Bluecoat and the subsequent Allied advance from Paris to the Rhine. The battalion later played a small part in Operation Market Garden, later taking part in Operation Veritable and crossing the Rhine in Operation Plunder, finally advancing into Germany in the Western Allied invasion of Germany. During Operation Epsom "the 2nd Battalion, The Glasgow Highlanders lost 12 officers and sustained nearly 200 casualties, mainly around the hotly contested village of Cheux. Total strength of this battalion was approximately 35 officers and 786 other ranks; thus one day's losses amounted to 34% of their officers and nearly 25% of the entire rifle battalion."

=== Postwar ===
In 1949 the unit was redesignated the '1st Battalion, The Glasgow Highlanders, The Highland Light Infantry (City of Glasgow Regiment)' and in 1959 transferred from the Highland Light Infantry to the new Royal Highland Fusiliers Regiment without a change of title. In 1967, with the formation of the Territorial Army and Volunteer Reserve (TAVR), the battalion laid up its colours and was amalgamated with the other TA battalions of Regiments in the Lowland Brigade, which were reformed as companies in three new TAVR battalions.

The name of the Glasgow Highlanders was initially carried on through 'HQ (Glasgow Highlanders) Company' of the 52nd Lowland Volunteers and 'C (Glasgow Highlanders) Company' of the 3rd (Territorial) Battalion, The Royal Highland Fusiliers. With the disbandment of the latter in 1969, it was only carried on by 'HQ (Glasgow Highlanders) Company' of the 1st Battalion, 52nd Lowland Volunteers. It later changed its affiliation to The 'Royal Highland Fusiliers' in 1973, thus formally ending the existence of a Glasgow Highlanders unit within the Territorial Army. The Glasgow Highlanders' name was continued by a platoon of the Army Cadet Force, attached to 52nd Lowland Regiment. However, in 2007, this ACF unit changed its affiliation to 52nd Lowland, 6th Battalion The Royal Regiment of Scotland and became F Platoon RHF (Maryhill). In May 2014, following a request by the Detachment Commander, the unit title was amended to F Platoon RHF (Glasgow Highlanders) to maintain historic links.

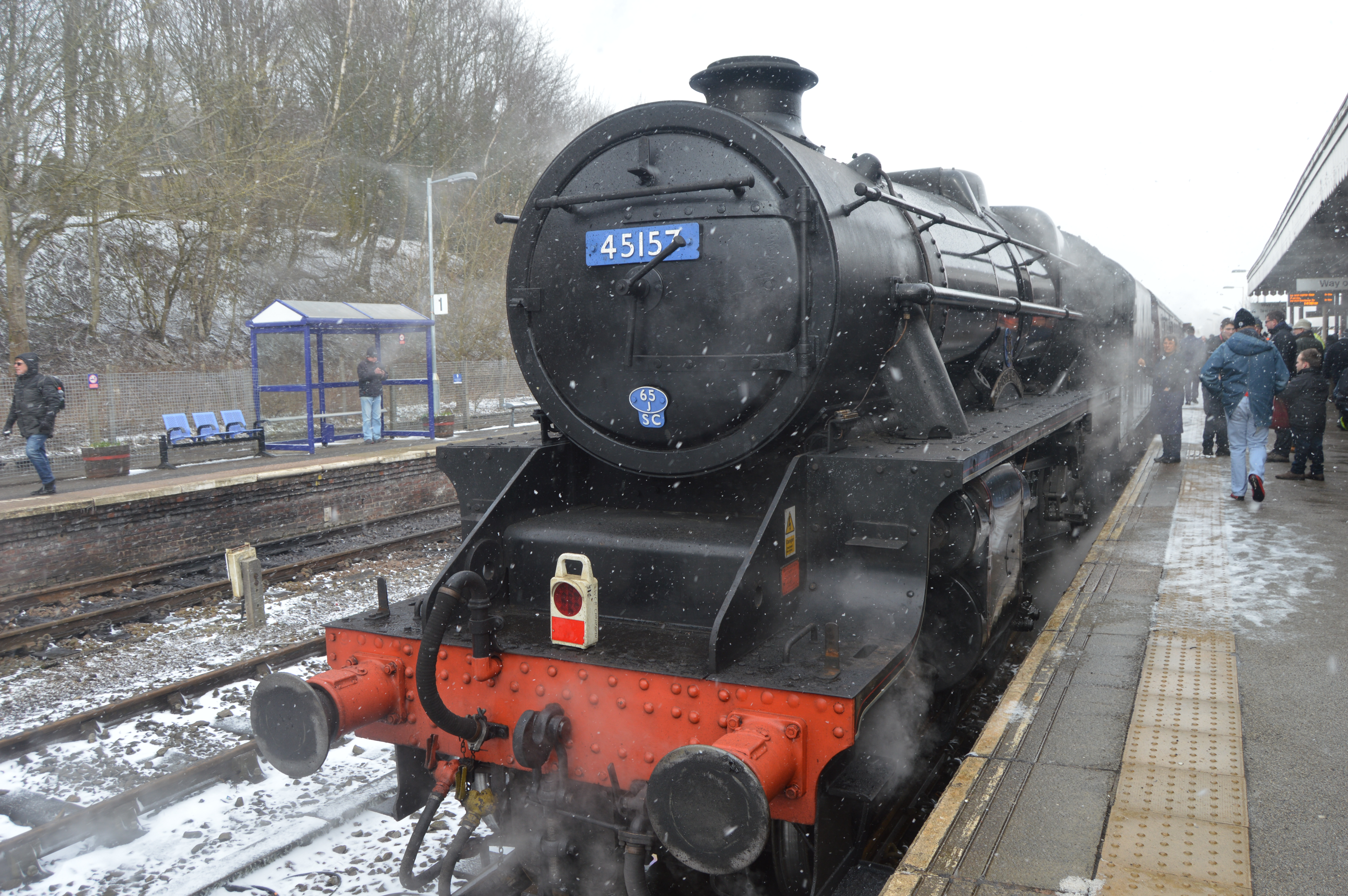
45407 at Buxton in March 2018 while in the identity of scrapped sister no 45157 The Glasgow Highlander.

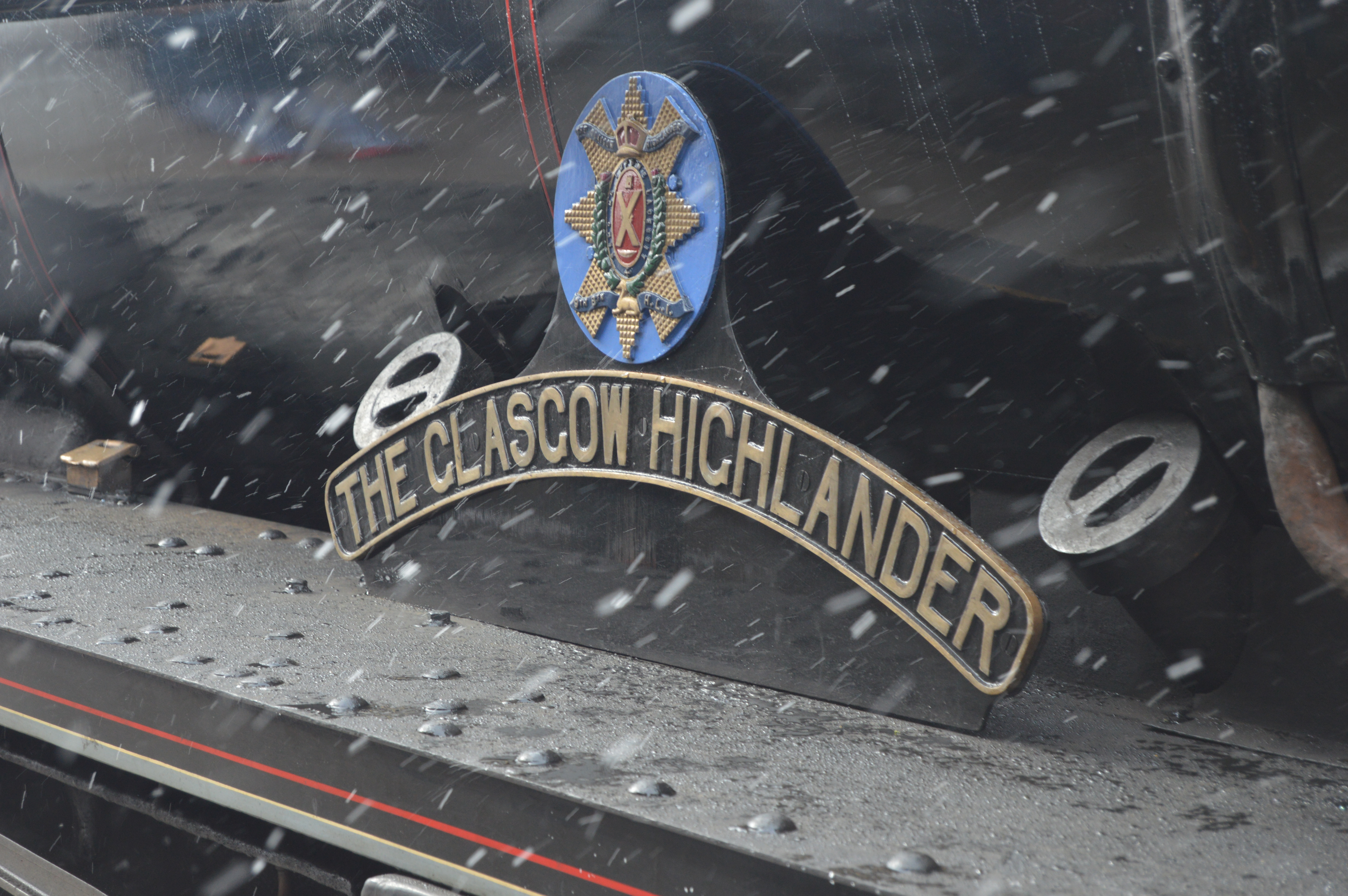
The Glasgow Highlander nameplate on the drivers side.

== Bibliography ==
- D'Este, C. (2004) [1983]. Decision in Normandy: The Real Story of Montgomery and the Allied Campaign. london: Penguin Books. ISBN 0-14-101761-9.
- Dunlop, Col John K., The Development of the British Army 1899–1914, London: Methuen, 1938.
- Leslie, N.B., (1970) Battle Honours of the British and Indian Armies 1695–1914, London: Leo Cooper, ISBN 0-85052-004-5.
- Spiers, Edward M., (1980) The Army and Society 1815–1914, London: Longmans, ISBN 0-582-48565-7.
- Weir, Alec (2005). Come on Highlanders!: The Glasgow Territorials in the Great War. Sutton Publishing. ISBN 0-7509-4230-4.
- Westlake, Ray (2010) Tracing the Rifle Volunteers, Barnsley: Pen and Sword, ISBN 978-1-84884-211-3.
