= Aubrey Symonds =

British civil servant

Sir Aubrey Symonds
- Born: Aubrey Vere Symonds; 18 October 1874; Pendleton, Lancashire, England
- Died: 24 March 1931 (aged 56); Folkestone, Kent, England
- Occupation: British civil servant

Sir Aubrey Vere Symonds KCB (18 October 1874 – 24 March 1931) was a senior British civil servant.

== Biography ==
Born in Pendleton, Lancashire, Symonds was the eldest son of Arthur Gibb Symonds and Florence Mary Kay. Physician John Addington Symonds was his great-uncle. He was educated at Bedford School and at University College, Oxford. He was Second Permanent Secretary at the Ministry of Health between 1919 and 1925, and Permanent Secretary at the Board of Education between 1925 and 1931.

He was appointed a Companion of the Order of the Bath (CB) in the 1916 Birthday Honours and promoted to Knight Commander in the same order (KCB) in the 1919 Birthday Honours.

In 1926, he married Alice Frances Denison Des Vœux, the former Lady Montgomery-Cuninghame (previously married to Sir Thomas Montgomery-Cuninghame, 10th Baronet, 1904–1925), daughter of Sir William Des Vœux.

Sir Aubrey died in 1931, six months after contacting pleurisy.

Government offices
Preceded by Sir Amherst Selby-Bigge	Permanent Secretary of the Board of Education; 1925–1931	Succeeded by Sir Henry Pelham
