= 35th Battalion =

35th Battalion may refer to:

- 35th Battalion (Australia), a unit of the Australian Army that served during World War I and II
- 35th Battalion (New Zealand), a unit of the New Zealand Military Forces during World War II
- 35th Battalion, CEF, a unit of the Canadian Expeditionary Force during World War I
- 35th Battalion Virginia Cavalry
- 35th Signal Battalion (United States)

== See also ==
- 35th Division (disambiguation)
- 35th Regiment (disambiguation)
- 35th Squadron (disambiguation)
