= 35th Reserve Division =

35th Reserve Division (35. Reserve-Division)
- Active: 1914-1919
- Country: Prussia/Germany
- Branch: Army
- Type: Infantry
- Size: Approx. 15,000
- Engagements: World War I: Battle of Tannenberg (1914), First Battle of the Masurian Lakes, Gorlice-Tarnów Offensive

The 35th Reserve Division (35. Reserve-Division) was a unit of the Imperial German Army in World War I. The division was formed on the mobilization of the German Army in August 1914. The division was disbanded during the demobilization of the German Army after World War I. The division began the war as part of the central reserve of Fortress Thorn (Hauptreserve/Festung Thorn). Although designated a reserve division, initially, it was primarily composed of Landwehr units. In 1916, it was completely reorganized, receiving new brigade headquarters and newly formed regiments.

== Combat chronicle ==
The 35th Reserve Division began the war on the Eastern Front. It fought in the Battle of Tannenberg and the First Battle of the Masurian Lakes. In 1915, it was transferred from Poland to Hungary and saw action in the Gorlice-Tarnów Offensive. Thereafter, it remained in White Russia until the armistice on the Eastern Front, when it went to Ukraine, where it remained until March 1919. Allied intelligence rated the division as fourth class.

== Order of battle on mobilization ==
The order of battle of the 35th Reserve Division on mobilization was as follows:

- 5.Landwehr-Infanterie-Brigade
  - Landwehr-Infanterie-Regiment Nr. 2
  - Landwehr-Infanterie-Regiment Nr. 9
- 20.Landwehr-Infanterie-Brigade
  - Landwehr-Infanterie-Regiment Nr. 19
  - Kgl. Sächs. Landwehr-Infanterie-Regiment Nr. 107
- schweres Reserve-Reiter-Regiment Nr. 3
- Ersatz-Abteilung/Feldartillerie-Regiment Nr. 35
- Ersatz-Abteilung/Feldartillerie-Regiment Nr. 81
- 1.Reserve-Kompanie/1. Westpreußisches Pionier-Bataillon Nr. 17

== Order of battle on April 1, 1916 ==
The 35th Reserve Division was triangularized in July 1915. The order of battle on April 1, 1916, was as follows:

- 5.Landwehr-Infanterie-Brigade
  - Landwehr-Infanterie-Regiment Nr. 2
  - Landwehr-Infanterie-Regiment Nr. 9
  - Kgl. Sächs. Landwehr-Infanterie-Regiment Nr. 107
  - Landsturm-Infanterie-Regiment Nr. 13
- schwere Reserve-Reiter-Regiment Nr. 3
- Reserve-Feldartillerie-Regiment Nr. 35
- 1.Reserve-Kompanie/1. Westpreußisches Pionier-Bataillon Nr. 17
- Landsturm-Pionier-Kompanie Nr. 9
- Minenwerfer-Kompanie Nr. 235

== Order of battle on December 15, 1916 ==
In November 1916, the 35th Reserve Division was completely reorganized. The 5th Landwehr Infantry Brigade and the 2nd and 9th Landwehr Infantry Regiments were sent to the 226th Infantry Division and the 167th Infantry Brigade headquarters was received from the 84th Infantry Division. Two newly raised infantry regiments, the 420th and 421st, replaced the lost Landwehr infantry regiments. The order of battle on December 15, 1916, was as follows:

- 167.Infanterie-Brigade
  - Infanterie-Regiment Nr. 420
  - Infanterie-Regiment Nr. 421
  - Kgl. Sächs. Landwehr-Infanterie-Regiment Nr. 107
  - Landsturm-Infanterie-Regiment Nr. 13
- 2.Eskadron/Jäger-Regiment zu Pferde Nr. 4
- Reserve-Feldartillerie-Regiment Nr. 35
- 1.Reserve-Kompanie/1. Westpreußisches Pionier-Bataillon Nr. 17
- Minenwerfer-Kompanie Nr. 235

== Order of battle on March 9, 1918 ==
Over the course of the war, other changes took place, including the formation of a signals command and a pioneer battalion. The remaining non-Prussian unit, the Saxon 107th Landwehr Infantry Regiment, was replaced by a Baden unit, the 438th Infantry Regiment. The 13th Landsturm Infantry Regiment was transferred out of the division. The order of battle on March 9, 1918, was as follows:

- 167.Infanterie-Brigade
  - Infanterie-Regiment Nr. 420
  - Infanterie-Regiment Nr. 421
  - Infanterie-Regiment Nr. 438
- 2.Eskadron/Jäger-Regiment zu Pferde Nr. 4
- Reserve-Feldartillerie-Regiment Nr. 35
- Stab Pionier-Bataillon Nr. 335
  - 1.Reserve-Kompanie/1. Westpreußisches Pionier-Bataillon Nr. 17
  - Minenwerfer-Kompanie Nr. 235
- Divisions-Nachrichten-Kommandeur 435
