= 35 =

35 or XXXV may refer to:

- 35 (number), the natural number following 34 and preceding 36
- 35 BC
- AD 35
- 1935
- 2035

== Science ==
- Bromine, a halogen in the periodic table
- 35 Leukothea, an asteroid in the asteroid belt
- HP-35, world's first scientific pocket calculator

== Music ==
- XXXV (album), a 2002 album by Fairport Convention
- 35xxxv, a 2015 album by One Ok Rock
- "35" (song), a 2021 song by New Zealand youth choir Ka Hao
- "Thirty Five", a song by Karma to Burn from the album Almost Heathen, 2001
- III-V, a type of semiconductor material

== Other uses ==
- 35 (film), an Indian Telugu-language drama film

== See also ==
- 35th (disambiguation)
