= Sir Thomas Montgomery-Cuninghame, 8th Baronet =

Lieutenant-Colonel Sir Thomas Montgomery-Cuninghame, 8th Baronet (c. 1808 – 30 August 1870) was a Scottish British Army officer.

== Early life ==
Montgomery-Cuninghame was born in London in c. 1808. He was the second son of Sir James Montgomery-Cuninghame, 6th Baronet and Janet Cuming. Among his siblings was Sir Alexander David Montgomery-Cuninghame, 7th Baronet, and Jessie Jean Montgomery-Cuninghame (who married Sir James Boswell, 2nd Baronet).

His paternal grandparents were the former Elizabeth Montgomery (a daughter of David Montgomery of Lainshaw, Ayrshire) and Alexander Montgomery-Cuninghame (a younger son of Sir David Cuninghame, 3rd Baronet), who legally changed his surname to Montgomery-Cuninghame on inheriting the Kirktonholm estate. Among his extended family were uncles, Sir Walter Montgomery-Cuninghame, 4th Baronet and Sir David Montgomery-Cuninghame, 5th Baronet. His maternal grandfather was Thomas Cuming, Esq., of Earnside, Nairnshire and Hatton, Cheshire, who was a banker in Edinburgh.

== Career ==
He began his military career as an Ensign with the 94th Regiment of Foot on 15 August 1826. He advanced to Lieutenant on 28 September 1830 before selling on 5 April 1833. He became a Major with the Royal Ayrshire Militia on 17 April 1837, Lieutenant-Colonel on 12 April 1850 until 14 September 1858.

Upon the death of his elder brother, Alexander David Montgomery-Cuninghame, who died unmarried on 8 June 1846, he succeeded as the 8th Baronet Cuninghame, of Corsehill, Ayrshire in the Baronetage of Nova Scotia. He also succeeded as the 15th Laird of Lainshaw.

== Personal life ==
In 1832, he married Charlotte Niven Doig Hutcheson (1816–1902), only child of Hugh Hutcheson of Southfield, Renfrewshire. Together, they were the parents of:

- Sir William James Montgomery-Cuninghame, 9th Baronet (1834–1897), an MP for Ayr Burghs; he married Elizabeth Hartopp at Dalby Hall, Leicestershire, daughter of Edward Bourchier Hartopp, MP for North Leicestershire, and Honoria Gent (a daughter of Maj.-Gen. William Gent), in 1869.
- Jessie Augusta Montgomery-Cuninghame (1835–1908), who married Hon. Augustus Anthony Frederick Irby, son of George Irby, 3rd Baron Boston and Rachel Ives Drake, in 1866.
- Arthur Hugh Montgomery-Cuninghame (1836–1850), an officer in the Royal Navy who died unmarried.
- Walter Montgomery-Cuninghame (1842–1856), who died young.
- Eleanor Montgomery-Cuninghame (1843–1921), who died unmarried.
- Edith Jane Montgomery-Cuninghame (1846–1855), who died young.
- Alice Montgomery-Cuninghame (1847–1847), who died young.

On 30 August 1870, Sir Thomas died at his residence, 16 Prince's Gate, Hyde Park, London (later the Iranian Embassy). He was succeeded in the baronetcy by his eldest son, William. His widow, Lady Montgomery-Cuninghame, died on 25 June 1902. In his memory, she had restored the "ancient burying place of the Glencairn family" at Kilmarnock Cemetery, Ayrshire, as Sir Thomas was a descendant of Andrew, second son of the 4th Earl of Glencairn.

Baronetage of Nova Scotia
Preceded by Alexander David Montgomery-Cuninghame	Baronet (of Corsehill); 1846–1870	Succeeded by William James Montgomery-Cuninghame
