= 35th Brigade =

35th Brigade may refer to:

== Canada ==
- 35 Canadian Brigade Group

== India ==
- 35th Indian Brigade of the British Indian Army in the First World War

== Israel ==
- 35th Paratroopers Brigade (Israel)

== Kazakhstan ==
- 35th Guards Air Assault Brigade

== Japan ==
- 35th Independent Mixed Brigade (Imperial Japanese Army)

== Russia ==
- 35th Separate Guards Motor Rifle Brigade

== Soviet Union ==
- 35th Guards Air Assault Brigade

== Ukraine ==
- 35th Marine Brigade (Ukraine)

== United Kingdom ==
- 35th Anti-Aircraft Brigade (United Kingdom)
- 35th Armoured Brigade (United Kingdom)
- 35th Brigade (United Kingdom)
- 35th Brigade Royal Field Artillery

== United States ==
- 35th Air Defense Artillery Brigade (United States)
- 35th Combat Aviation Brigade (United States)
- 35th Corps Signal Brigade (United States)
- 35th Division Sustainment Brigade
- 35th Engineer Brigade (United States)
- 35th Military Police Brigade

== See also ==
- 35th Division (disambiguation)
- 35th Regiment (disambiguation)
