= 35 Squadron =

35 Squadron or 35th Squadron may refer to:

- No. 35 Squadron RAF
- No. 35 Squadron, Indian Air Force
- No. 35 Squadron RAAF
- 35 Squadron SAAF

== United States ==
- 35th Bombardment Squadron
- 35th Fighter Squadron
- 35th Flying Training Squadron
- 35th Reconnaissance Squadron (Heavy)

== See also ==
- 35th Wing
