= 35th Regiment =

35th Regiment or 35th Infantry Regiment may refer to:

== Infantry regiments ==
- Kawaguchi Detachment (IJA 35th Independent Mixed Brigade), a unit of the Imperial Japanese Army
- 35th Sikhs, a unit of the British Indian Army
- 35th (Royal Sussex) Regiment of Foot, a unit of the British Army
- 35th Infantry Regiment (France), a unit of the French Army
- 35th Infantry Regiment (United States), a unit of the United States Army

== Engineering regiments ==
- 35 Engineer Regiment (United Kingdom), a unit of the British Army's Royal Engineers

== Signal regiments ==
- 35 (South Midlands) Signal Regiment, a unit of the British Army

== Logistics regiments ==
- Combat Logistics Regiment 35, a unit of the United States Marine Corps

== Artillery regiments ==
- 35th Parachute Artillery Regiment, a unit of the French Army

== American Civil War regiments ==
- 35th Illinois Volunteer Infantry Regiment
- 35th Regiment Indiana Infantry
- 35th Iowa Volunteer Infantry Regiment
- 35th Regiment Kentucky Volunteer Infantry
- 35th Wisconsin Volunteer Infantry Regiment
- 35th Ohio Infantry

== See also ==
- 35th Division (disambiguation)
- 35th Squadron (disambiguation)
