= 221st Mixed Brigade (United Kingdom) =

- Active: 1914–1919
- Country: United Kingdom
- Branch: British Army
- Type: Infantry Brigade
- Role: Home Defence
- Part of: Scottish Coast Defences; Southern Army; Eastern Command

221st Mixed Brigade was a Scottish Home Service formation of the British Army that served under various titles throughout World War I.

== Origin ==
When the Volunteer Force was subsumed into the new Territorial Force (TF) under the Haldane Reforms in 1908, the 1st and 2nd Lothian Volunteer Infantry Brigades (previously the Forth Brigade) became the Lothian Brigade (TF). It was not included in the Lowland Division with the rest of the TF units from Southern Scotland, but formed an independent brigade in Scottish Coastal Defences.

== Mobilisation ==
On the outbreak of war on 4 August 1914, the Lothian Brigade of the Territorial Force (TF) mobilised at Edinburgh under Brigadier-General H.F. Kays as part of Scottish Coastal Defences, with the following units under command:

- 4th (Queen's Edinburgh Rifles) Battalion, Royal Scots (Lothian Regiment)
- 5th (Queen's Edinburgh Rifles) Battalion, Royal Scots (Lothian Regiment)
- 8th Battalion, Royal Scots (Lothian Regiment)
- 9th (Highlanders) Battalion, Royal Scots (Lothian Regiment)

attached:

- 6th Battalion, Royal Scots (Lothian Regiment)
- 7th Battalion, Royal Scots (Lothian Regiment)
- 8th (Lanark) Battalion, Highland Light Infantry

Almost immediately (31 August 1914), TF units were authorised to raise 2nd battalions formed from those men who had not volunteered for, or were not fit for, overseas service, together with new volunteers. A 2nd Lothian Brigade was formed from these units, but the two brigades merged again as the 1st Line battalions progressively went overseas in late 1914 and early 1915 to reinforce Regular Army formations or join the 52nd (Lowland) Infantry Division (TF).

Other units were also posted to the Lothian Brigade for short periods in early 1915, including Special Reserve (former Militia) battalions:

- 3rd (Reserve) Battalion, Royal Scots (Lothian Regiment)
- 3rd (Reserve) Battalion, King's Own Scottish Borderers
- 3rd (Reserve) Battalion, Princess Louise's (Argyll and Sutherland Highlanders)
- 4th (Extra Reserve) Battalion, Princess Louise's (Argyll and Sutherland Highlanders)
- 4th (Extra Reserve) Battalion, Highland Light Infantry

locally raised 'Pals' Battalions':

- 16th (Service) Battalion (2nd Edinburgh), Royal Scots (Lothian Regiment) (largely from Heart of Midlothian Football Club players and supporters) (left 18 June 1915)
- 17th (Service) Battalion (Rosebery), Royal Scots (Lothian Regiment) (Bantam battalion raised by Lord Rosebery) (left 4 June 1915)

and others such as:

- 1st Battalion, Royal Newfoundland Regiment (left 11 May 1915)
- Hampshire Provisional Battalion (left 20 May 1915)

(not including TF battalions of the Royal Scots that were administratively attached while temporarily stationed at Edinburgh).

== Provisional Brigade ==
Early in 1915 the 2nd Line TF battalions were raised to full strength to form 2nd Line divisions such as the 65th (2nd Lowland) Division, and began to form Reserve (3rd Line) units. Once again the remaining Home Service men were separated out in May 1915 to form Coast Defence Battalions (termed Provisional Battalions from June 1915). The Special Reserve battalions of the Lothian Brigade were split off into a separate Special Reserve Brigade (6 June 1915) and the Lothian Brigade was first retitled Scottish Provisional Brigade (1 July 1915) and then 1st Provisional Brigade.

The composition of 1st Provisional Brigade was then as follows:

- 1/8th Battalion, Highland Light Infantry (insufficient numbers had volunteered for overseas service; became 8th (Scottish) Provisional Battalion; left 23 June 1915)
- 3rd (Scottish) Provisional Battalion (formed April 1915 from home service details of 3rd Highland Brigade (6th, 7th, 8th and 9th Battalions, Argyll and Sutherland Highlanders); joined 22 May 1915)
- 9th (Scottish) Provisional Battalion (formed from home service details of Highland Light Infantry Brigade (5th, 6th, 7th and 9th Battalions, Highland Light Infantry); joined 22 May 1915)
- 11th (Scottish) Provisional Battalion (formed from home service details of 4th and 5th Battalions, Royal Scots Fusiliers and 8th Battalion, Cameronians (Scottish Rifles); joined 23 May 1915)
- 12th Scottish Provisional Battalion (formed from home service details of 4th and 5th Battalions, King's Own Scottish Borderers; joined 22 May, left 10 June 1915)
- 18th (Reserve) Battalion, Royal Scots (Lothian Regiment) (formed June 1915 at Edinburgh from Depot companies of 15th, 16th and 17th Battalions; left 25 October 1915)
- 3/1st Lothians and Border Horse (joined 23 August, left 31 December 1915)
- 3/1st Lowland Feld Battery Royal Field Artillery (left 31 December 1915)
- 1st Provisional Field Ambulance Royal Army Medical Corps (joined 3 September 1915)
- 1st Provisional Field Company Royal Engineers (joined 6 September 1915)
- 1st Provisional Battery and Ammunition Column Royal Field Artillery (joined 25 October 1915)
- 1st Provisional Brigade Train Army Service Corps

In April 1916, 1st Provisional Brigade moved by train from Edinburgh, first to the Bishops Stortford area, the on 25 April to the East Kent coast on 25 April. Brigadier-General A.G. Duff took over from Brig.-Gen. Kay, and the brigade came under the orders of 67th (2nd Home Counties) Division in Southern Army. The brigade was now billeted as follows:

- Brigade HQ – Sandwich
- 1st Provisional Battery and Ammunition Column – Worth
- 1st Provisional Field Company – Woodnesborough
- 3rd (Scottish) Provisional Battalion – Sandwich Bay
- 9th (Scottish) Provisional Battalion – Deal
- 10th (Scottish) Provisional Battalion (formed from home service details of 5th, 6th and 7th Battalions, Cameronians (Scottish Rifles); absorbed 12th Scottish Prov. Bn April 1916) – Deal
- 11th (Scottish) Provisional Battalion – Walmer
- 1st Provisional Field Brigade Train – Sandwich
- 1st Provisional Field Ambulance – Sandwich

== Home defence ==
The Military Service Act 1916 swept away the Home/Foreign service distinction, and all TF soldiers became liable for overseas service, if medically fit. The Provisional Brigades thus became anomalous, and on 1 January 1917 the remaining battalions were formed into numbered battalions of their parent units in new Mixed Brigades and Home Service Divisions. Part of their role was physical conditioning to render men fit for drafting overseas, alongside units of the Training Reserve. 1st Provisional Brigade became 221st Infantry Brigade, with its subunits redesignated as follows:

- 1203rd (Lowland) Battery and Ammunition Column, RFA (later 414th Battery and 414th Ammunition Column, RFA, at Sandwich)
- 640th (Lowland) Field Company, RE
- 11th Battalion, Royal Scots Fusiliers (from 11th Prov. Bn)
- 15th Battalion, Cameronians (Scottish Rifles) (from 10th Prov. Bn)
- 21st Battalion, Highland Light Infantry (from 9th Prov. Bn)
- 16th Battalion, Princess Louise's (Argyll and Sutherland Highlanders) (from 3rd Prov. Bn)
- 221st Brigade Train, ASC (later 833rd Horse Transport Company, ASC)
- 329th (Lowland) Field Ambulance, RAMC

The brigade remained guarding the Kent coast throughout 1917, occasionally enduring bombing attacks from German Zeppelins and aircraft. Brigadier-General J. Marriott took over command in May 1917. On 25 October 1917 the title of the formation was changed to 221st Mixed Brigade (reflecting its all-arms rather than purely infantry composition).

On 26 November 1917, 1203rd (Lowland) Battery transferred to 12th Brigade, Royal Field Artillery, which was reforming in 67th (2nd Home Counties) Division.

On 12 February 1918 the brigade was transferred from the command of 67th Division in Southern Army to the Cyclist Division under Eastern Command, with only minor changes in deployment.

In May 1918 each of the Mixed Brigades was called upon to provide a battalion (redesignated a Garrison Guard battalion) to reconstitute the 59th (2nd North Midland) Division, which had been virtually destroyed during the German spring offensive. 221st Mixed Brigade supplied 11th Royal Scots Fusiliers (RSF) to 178th (2/1st Nottinghamshire and Derbyshire) Brigade and immediately raised a new 13th (Home Service) Battalion RSF to take over its coast defence duties.

With the war coming to an end, the brigade received orders for disbandment on 7 November 1918. The battalions dispersed in the following March and April (being formally disbanded in July) and Brigade HQ closed on 11 April 1919.

== External sources ==
- Chris Baker, The Long, Long Trail
- Mark Conrad, The British Army, 1914 (archive site)
- The Regimental Warpath 1914–1918
- David Porter's work on Provisional Brigades at Great War Forum
