= List of battalions of the Cameronians (Scottish Rifles) =

This is a list of battalions of the Cameronians (Scottish Rifles), which existed as an infantry regiment of the British Army from 1881 to 1968.

== Original composition ==
When the 26th (Cameronian) Regiment of Foot, and 90th Perthshire Light Infantry amalgamated to form The Cameronians (Scottish Rifles) in 1881 under the Cardwell-Childers reforms of the British Armed Forces, seven pre-existent militia and volunteer battalions of Lanarkshire and Dumfries and Galloway were integrated into the structure of the regiment. Volunteer battalions had been created in reaction to a perceived threat of invasion by France in the late 1850s. Organised as "rifle volunteer corps", they were independent of the British Army and composed primarily of the middle class. The only change to the regiment's structure during the period of 1881-1908 occurred in 1897, when the 5th Volunteer Battalion was disbanded as a result of poor discipline.

Battalion	Formed	Formerly
Regular
1st	1688	1st Battalion, 26th (Cameronian) Regiment of Foot
2nd	1794	1st Battalion, 90th Regiment of Foot (Perthshire Volunteers) (Light Infantry)
Militia
3rd (Militia)	1854	1st Battalion, 2nd Royal Lanark Militia
4th (Militia)	1854	2nd Battalion, 2nd Royal Lanark Militia
Volunteers
1st Lanarkshire (Glasgow 1st Western) Volunteer Rifle Corps [1st VB]	1859	
2nd Volunteer	1859	2nd Lanarkshire Rifle Volunteer Corps
3rd Lanarkshire (1st Glasgow Southern) Volunteer Rifle Corps [3rd VB]	1860	
4th Volunteer	1859	4th Lanarkshire (Glasgow 1st Northern) Rifle Volunteer Corps
5th Volunteer	1859	7th Lanarkshire Rifle Volunteer Corps

== Reorganisation ==
The Territorial Force (later Territorial Army) was formed in 1908, which the volunteer battalions joined, while the militia battalions transferred to the "Special Reserve". All volunteer battalions were renumbered to create a single sequential order.

Battalion	Formerly
5th	1st Lanarkshire (Glasgow 1st Western) Volunteer Rifle Corps
6th	2nd Volunteer Battalion
7th	3rd Lanarkshire Volunteer Rifle Corps
8th	4th Volunteer Battalion

== First World War ==
The Cameronians fielded 28 battalions and lost 7,106 officers and other ranks during the course of the war. The regiment's territorial components formed duplicate second and third line battalions. As an example, the three-line battalions of the 5th Cameronians were numbered as the 1/5th, 2/5th, and 3/5th respectively, with the third line battalions, being redesignated reserve battalions in 1916. Many battalions of the regiment were formed as part of Secretary of State for War Lord Kitchener's appeal for an initial 100,000 men volunteers in 1914. They were referred to as the New Army or Kitchener's Army. The New Army, 13th (Service) battalion, was referred to as a "Pals" battalion because it was predominantly composed of colleagues. The Volunteer Training Corps were raised with overage or reserved occupation men early in the war, and were initially self-organised into many small corps, with a wide variety of names. Recognition of the corps by the authorities brought regulation and as the war continued the small corps were formed into battalion sized units of the county Volunteer Regiment. In 1918 these were linked to county regiments.

Battalion	Formed	Served	Fate
Regular
1st	1688	Western Front	
2nd	1794	Western Front	
Special Reserve
3rd (Reserve)	1854	Britain	
4th (Extra Reserve)	1854	Britain	
Territorial Force
1/5th	1859	Western Front	See Inter-War
1/6th	1859	Western Front	
1/7th	1860	Gallipoli, Western Front	
1/8th	1859	Gallipoli, Western Front	See Inter-War
2/5th	Glasgow, September 1914	Britain, Ireland	
2/6th	Hamilton, September 1914	Britain, Ireland	
2/7th	Glasgow, September 1914	Britain	Absorbed by 2/6th Battalion, in January 1916
2/8th	Glasgow, September 1914	Britain	Absorbed by 2/5th Battalion in January 1916
3/5th 5th (Reserve) Battalion, from April 1916	Glasgow, November 1914	Britain	Disbanded, in December 1918
3/6th 6th (Reserve) Battalion, from April 1916	Hamilton, April 1915	Britain	Absorbed by 5th (Reserve) Battalion, in September 1916
3/7th 7th (Reserve) Battalion, from April 1916	Glasgow, March 1915	Britain	Absorbed by 5th (Reserve) Battalion, in September 1916
3/8th 8th (Reserve) Battalion, from April 1916	Glasgow, March 1915	Britain	Absorbed by 5th (Reserve) Battalion, in September 1916
15th	January 1917 from 10th (Scottish) Provisional Battalion (Territorial Force)	Britain	Disbanded, in July 1919
New Army
9th (Service)	Hamilton, August 1914	Western Front	Disbanded, 1919
10th (Service)	Hamilton, September 1914	Western Front	Disbanded, 1919
11th (Service)	Hamilton, October 1914	Western Front, Salonika	Disbanded, 1920
12th (Reserve)	Nigg, October 1914	Britain	Converted to 56th Training Reserve Battalion of the 12th Reserve Brigade, in September 1916
13th (Service)	Hamilton, July 1915	Britain	Absorbed by 14th Battalion, Highland Light Infantry, in February 1916
Others
14th (Labour)	June 1916	Western Front	Became Nos. 3 and 4 Companies, Labour Corps, in April 1917
16th (Transport Workers)	Paisley, December 1916	Britain	Disbanded, in 1919
17th (Transport Workers)	Hamilton, February 1917	Britain	Disbanded, in 1919
18th (Service)	Aldershot, June 1918	Western Front	Disbanded, in 1919
1st Garrison	Hamilton, February 1916	India	Disbanded, in 1920
Volunteer Training Corps
1/1st Battalion Lanarkshire Volunteer Regiment		Coatbridge	Disbanded post war
2/1st Battalion Lanarkshire Volunteer Regiment		Motherwell	Disbanded post war
3/1st Battalion Lanarkshire Volunteer Regiment		Lanark	Disbanded post war

== Inter-War ==
By 1920, all of the regiment's war-raised battalions had disbanded. The Special Reserve reverted to its militia designation in 1921, then to the Supplementary Reserve in 1924; however, its battalions were effectively placed in 'suspended animation'.

Battalion	Fate
5th	Amalgamated with 8th Battalion, to form 5th/8th Battalion, in August 1921.
8th	Amalgamated with 5th Battalion, to form 5th/8th Battalion, in August 1921.

As World War II approached, the Territorial Army was reorganised in the mid-1930s, many of its infantry battalions were converted to other roles, especially anti-aircraft.

Battalion	Fate
5th/8th	Converted to 56th Searchlight Regiment, in November 1938. Formed duplicate 8th Battalion (57th Searchlight Regiment) in 1939.

== Second World War ==
The regiment's expansion during the Second World War was modest compared to 1914–1918. National Defence Companies were combined to create a new "Home Defence" battalion, In addition six battalions of the Home Guard were affiliated to the regiment, wearing its cap badge. One Light Anti-Aircraft (LAA) troop was formed from a local battalion to defend a factory. Due to the daytime (or shift working) occupations of the men in the LAA troop, it required eight times the manpower of an equivalent regular unit.

Battalion	Formed	Served	Fate
Regular
1st	1688	Burma, Chindits	See Post-World War II
2nd	1794	Dunkirk, Sicily, Italy, North West Europe	See Post-World War II
Supplementary Reserve
3rd	1854		See Post-World War II
4th	1854		See Post-World War II
Territorial Army
6th (Lanarkshire)	1859	Dunkirk, North West Europe	See Post-World War II
7th	1860	Dunkirk, North West Europe	See Post-World War II
9th	1939	Britain, France, North West Europe	Disbanded, in August 1945
10th (Lanarkshire)	1939	Britain	Amalgamated with 6th (Lanarkshire) Battalion, in January 1947
11th (Home Defence)	1939	Britain	Amalgamated with 13th (Home Defence) Battalion, to form 30th (Home Defence) Battalion, in 1941
12th	1940	Britain	Disbanded, in 1943
13th (Home Defence)	1940	Britain	Amalgamated with 11th (Home Defence) Battalion, to form 30th (Home Defence) Battalion, in 1941
30th (Home Defence)	1941	Britain	Disbanded, in 1943
Others
50th (Holding)	1940	Britain	Disbanded, in 1940

Home Guard
Battalion	Headquarters	Formation Sign (dark blue on khaki)	Battalion	Headquarters	Formation Sign (dark blue on khaki)
1st	Lanark	LK 1	2nd	Airdrie	LK 2
3rd	Wishaw	LK 3	4th	Hamilton	LK 4
5th	Rutherglen	LK 5	6th	Motherwell	LK 6
Home Guard Light Anti-Aircraft units
Formation Sign (dark blue on khaki)	Headquarters or Location	AA Formation and Designation			
LK 3	Mossend, Murex Ltd	A Troop LAA			

== Post-World War II ==
In the immediate post-war period, the army was significantly reduced: nearly all infantry regiments had their first and second battalions amalgamated and the Supplementary Reserve disbanded.

Battalion	Fate
1st	Amalgamated with 2nd Battalion on the 19 September 1949, without a change in title
2nd	Amalgamated with 1st Battalion on 19 September 1949
6th (Lanarkshire)	Amalgamated with 7th Battalion on 30 June 1950, to form 6th/7th Battalion
7th	Amalgamated with 6th (Lanarkshire) Battalion on 30 June 1950, to form 6th/7th Battalion

== Disbandment ==
After the 1966 Defence White Paper, the Cameronians decided to disband rather than be amalgamated. This meant that only the Territorial elements of the regiment, carried on the lineage, until 1997 when the last remaining company was rebadged and the Cameronians came to an end.

Battalion	Fate
1st	Disbanded, on 14 May 1968
6th/7th	Became D Company (The Cameronians (Scottish Rifles)), 52nd Lowland Volunteers, and B Company (6th/7th Cameronians (Scottish Rifles)), Royal Scots and Cameronians Territorials, on 1 April 1967
