= 195th (2/1st Scottish Rifles) Brigade =

- Active: 1915-1918
- Country: United Kingdom
- Branch: Territorial Army
- Type: Infantry
- Size: Brigade
- Part of: 65th (2nd Lowland) Division
- Engagements: World War I

The 195th (2/1st Scottish Rifles) Brigade was an infantry brigade of the British Army raised during the Great War. The brigade was part of the Territorial Force and created as a 2nd Line of the 156th (Scottish Rifles) Brigade and part of the 65th (2nd Lowland) Division, itself formed as a 2nd Line of the 52nd (Lowland) Division. The brigade was initially composed of four battalions of the Cameronians (Scottish Rifles).

== Origin ==
The units and formations of the Territorial Force were mobilised on the outbreak of war on 4 August 1914. Almost immediately, they were invited to volunteer for Overseas Service. On 15 August, the War Office issued instructions to separate those men who had signed up for Home Service only, and form them into reserve units. On 31 August, the formation of a reserve or 2nd Line unit was authorised for each 1st Line unit where 60 per cent or more of the men had volunteered for Overseas Service. The titles of these 2nd Line units would be the same as the original, but distinguished by a '2/' prefix. The large numbers of volunteers coming forward were assigned to these 2nd Line units for training. Later, the Home Service men were separated into provisional units, while the 2nd Line continued to train drafts for the 1st Line serving overseas.

== Order of battle ==
The brigade's initial organisation was as follows:

- 2/5th Battalion, Cameronians (Scottish Rifles)
- 2/6th Battalion, Cameronians (Scottish Rifles)
- 2/7th Battalion, Cameronians (Scottish Rifles)
- 2/8th Battalion, Cameronians (Scottish Rifles)

=== Reorganisation ===
In November 1915 the units of 65th (2nd L) Division were reorganised into composite battalions and numbered sequentially. At this time 195th Bde was composed as follows:

- No 17 Battalion (2/5th and 2/8th Bns, Scottish Rifles)
- No 18 Battalion (2/6th and 2/7th Bns, Scottish Rifles)
- No 19 Battalion (2/4th (Queen's Edinburgh Rifles), 2/5th (Queen's Edinburgh Rifles) and 2/6th Bns, Royal Scots)
- No 20 Battalion (2/9th (Highland) Bn, Royal Scots)

=== Later war ===
In January 1916 the composite battalions returned to their original regiments:

- 2/4th Bn Royal Scots – disbanded August 1917
- 2/9th Bn Royal Scots – disbanded March 1918
- 2/5th Bn Scottish Rifles – disbanded May 1918
- 2/6th Bn Scottish Rifles – disbanded May 1918
- 217th Graduated Bn, Training Reserve – joined July 1917; became 51st (Graduated) Bn, King's (Liverpool Regiment) October 1917; to 68th Division March 1918

== Service ==
The brigade was formed in January 1915, but progressive training of the 2nd Line units was hampered by the need to provide frequent reinforcement drafts to the 1st Line, by the lack of up-to-date arms and equipment, and the reorganisation when Home Service men were drafted to separate units. By August 195, 65th (2nd L) Division had concentrated round Bridge of Allan, with 195th Bde at Cambusbarron, where it remained until March 1916. In that month the division moved to Essex, where it joined Southern Army (Home Forces), with 195th Bde at Billericay, later at Witham and Terling.

Early in 1917 the division was sent to Ireland to relieve 59th (2nd North Midland) Division, which had been based there since the Easter Rising of 1916. 195th Brigade was dispersed to Fermoy, Tralee, Limerick, Moore Park and Kilworth.

65th (2nd Lowland) Division and its brigades were disbanded on 18 March 1918.

== Commanders ==
The following officers commanded the brigade:

- Colonel J.C.L. Campbell, 21 January 1915
- Brigadier-General P.A. Turner, 10 December 1915 to 15 March 1918
