= 156th (Scottish Rifles) Brigade =

Scottish Rifles Brigade 156th (Scottish Rifles) Brigade 156th Infantry Brigade
- Active: 1902-1919; 1920–1947
- Country: United Kingdom
- Branch: British Army
- Type: Infantry
- Role: Infantry; Mountain; Air Landing
- Size: Brigade
- Part of: 52nd (Lowland) Infantry Division
- Engagements: First World War; Second World War

Commanders
- Notable commanders: C. N. Barclay

The 156th (Scottish Rifles) Brigade was an infantry brigade formation of the British Army. The brigade saw active service in both the First and the Second World Wars with the 52nd (Lowland) Infantry Division.

== Origins ==
The Scottish Rifles Brigade was originally a Volunteer Infantry Brigade formed in 1902 when the former Glasgow Brigade of the Volunteer Force was split up. The four Volunteer Battalions of the Cameronians (Scottish Rifles) constituted one brigade, while the four Volunteer Battalions of the Highland Light Infantry formed the other (the Highland Light Infantry Brigade, later the 157th (Highland Light Infantry) Brigade of the TF).

From 1902 to 1908 the Scottish Rifles Brigade had the following composition:

- 1st Lanarkshire Volunteer Rifle Corps at 128 West Princes Street, Glasgow
- 2nd Volunteer Battalion, Cameronians (Scottish Rifles) at Hamilton, South Lanarkshire,
- 3rd Lanarkshire Volunteer Rifle Corps at Victoria Road, Glasgow
- 4th Volunteer Battalion, Cameronians (Scottish Rifles) at 138 Stirling Road, Glasgow
- Bearer Company, Royal Army Medical Corps, later an Army Service Corps Company

The Brigade Headquarters (HQ) was at 149 Cathedral Street, Glasgow, and the brigade commander from 1 June 1906 was retired Colonel E.C. Browne.

== Territorial Force ==
After the Volunteers were subsumed into the new Territorial Force (TF) under the Haldane Reforms of 1908, the Scottish Rifles Brigade formed part of the Lowland Division of the TF with the following composition:

- 5th Battalion, Cameronians (Scottish Rifles), at Glasgow
- 6th Battalion, Cameronians (Scottish Rifles), at Muirhall, Hamilton
- 7th Battalion, Cameronians (Scottish Rifles), at Victoria Road, Glasgow
- 8th Battalion, Cameronians (Scottish Rifles), at Cathedral Street, Glasgow

== First World War ==
The Lowland Division was mobilised for full-time war service in early August 1914, and most of the men, when asked, volunteered for overseas service. From November 1914 to March 1915, many units of the division were posted elsewhere, mainly to reinforce the Regular Army divisions of the British Expeditionary Force (BEF) on the Western Front, most of which had suffered heavy casualties. The 5th and 6th battalions of the Cameronians (Scottish Rifles) were sent to the Western Front and replaced by the 4th and 7th battalions of the Royal Scots.

In May 1915 the division was numbered as the 52nd (Lowland) Division and the brigades were also numbered, the Scottish Rifles Brigade becoming 156th (Scottish Rifles) Brigade and the battalions were redesignated, becoming '1/7th Royal Scots', to distinguish them from their 2nd Line units being formed in the 195th (2/1st Scottish Rifles) Brigade, part of the 65th (2nd Lowland) Division.

During the war the brigade served with the division in the Middle Eastern theatre, fighting in 1917 in the Battle of Romani, the First Battle of Gaza, Second Battle of Gaza and Third Battle of Gaza during the Sinai and Palestine Campaign and, in 1918, served on the Western Front, fighting in the Hundred Days Offensive.

=== Order of battle ===
- 1/5th Battalion, Cameronians (Scottish Rifles) (to November 1914)
- 1/6th Battalion, Cameronians (Scottish Rifles) (left March 1915)
- 1/7th Battalion, Cameronians (Scottish Rifles)
- 1/8th Battalion, Cameronians (Scottish Rifles) (left 28 June 1918)
- 1/4th (Queen's Edinburgh Rifles) Battalion, Royal Scots (from April 1915)
- 1/7th Battalion, Royal Scots (from April 1915)
- 156th Machine Gun Company, Machine Gun Corps (formed 16 March 1916, moved to 52nd Battalion, Machine Gun Corps 28 April 1918)
- 156th Trench Mortar Battery (formed 27 June 1917)

== Inter-war period ==
After the war the brigade and division were disbanded as was the whole of the Territorial Force. The Territorial Force was reformed in the 1920s as the Territorial Army (TA) and the 52nd Division was reconstituted as was the brigade which was redesignated as the 156th (Scottish Rifles) Infantry Brigade with the same unit it had pre-war.

In 1921, the 5th and 8th Battalions of the Cameronians (Scottish Rifles) were amalgamated as the 5th/8th Battalion and were replaced by the 4th/5th Battalion, Royal Scots Fusiliers from the 155th (East Scottish) Infantry Brigade. Shortly after, the brigade was redesignated the 156th (West Scottish) Infantry Brigade.

In the late 1930s many of the Territorial Army's infantry battalions were converted into other roles, mainly anti-aircraft and searchlight units. In late 1938, all British infantry brigades were reduced from four to three battalions and the 5th/8th Cameronians was chosen to be converted and became 5th/8th Battalion, Cameronians (Scottish Rifles) (56th Searchlight Regiment). In 1939 the brigade was redesignated 156th Infantry Brigade.

== Second World War ==
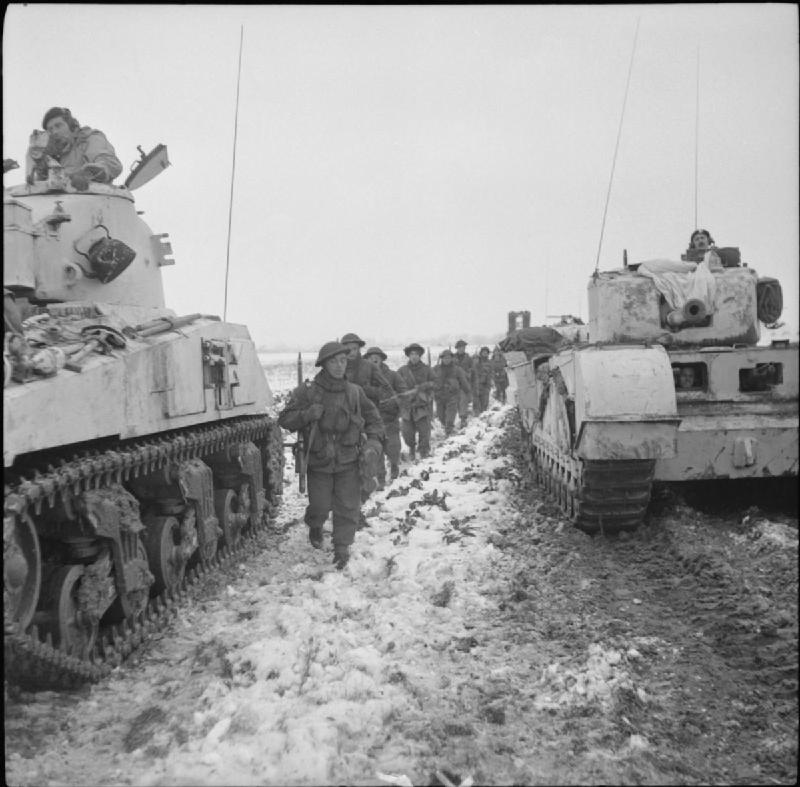
Men of the 4th/5th Battalion, Royal Scots Fusiliers pass between a Sherman and a Churchill tank during the 52nd Division's attack towards Stein from Tuddern, 18 January 1945.

During the Second World War, the brigade served with the division during Operation Aerial in 1940 in France to cover the withdrawal of troops of the British Expeditionary Force (BEF) which was being evacuated from France. From May 1942 to June 1944 the division was trained in mountain warfare yet were never used in the role. They were then trained in airlanding operations but were again never utilised in this role either, due mainly to the disastrous events that occurred during the Battle of Arnhem where the British 1st Airborne Division was virtually destroyed. In October 1944 the 52nd Division was sent to the Western Front to join the 21st Army Group and were attached to the First Canadian Army and fought in the Battle of the Scheldt where the 52nd Division gained an excellent reputation. The 156th Infantry Brigade, with the 52nd, took part in Operation Blackcock in early 1945, later taking part in the Western Allied invasion of Germany, and ended the war by the River Elbe. During Blackcock, Fusilier Dennis Donnini of the 4th/5th Battalion, Royal Scots Fusiliers was posthumously awarded the Victoria Cross. At the age of 19, he was the youngest British or Commonwealth soldier to be awarded the VC during the Second World War.

=== Order of battle ===
156th Brigade was constituted as follows during the war:

- 4th/5th Battalion, Royal Scots Fusiliers
- 6th Battalion, Cameronians (Scottish Rifles)
- 7th Battalion, Cameronians (Scottish Rifles) (to 13 March 1945)
- 156th Infantry Brigade Anti-Tank Company (formed 5 December 1939, disbanded 7 January 1941)
- 1st Battalion, Glasgow Highlanders (from 14 March 1945)

=== Commanders ===
The following officers commanded 156 Brigade during the war:

- Brigadier F.G. Chalmer (until 16 April 1940)
- Brigadier H.J. Simson (from 16 April until 21 May 1940)
- Brigadier J.S.N. Fitzgerald (from 21 May until 19 August 1940)
- Brigadier I.C. Grant (from 19 August 1940 until 3 December 1941)
- Brigadier C.N. Barclay (from 3 December 1941 until 27 August 1943)
- Lieutenant-Colonel J. Greenshields (acting, from 27 August to 22 November 1943)
- Brigadier C.N. Barclay (from 22 November 1943 until 2 April 1945)
- Brigadier G.D. Renny (from 2 April 1945)

== Victoria Cross recipients ==
- Fusilier Dennis Donnini, 4th/5th Battalion, Royal Scots Fusiliers, Second World War

== Bibliography ==
- Becke, Archibald F. (1936). Order of Battle of Divisions Part 2A. The Territorial Force Mounted Divisions and the 1st-Line Territorial Force Divisions (42–56). London: HMSO. OCLC 4405016.
- John K. Dunlop, The Development of the British Army 1899–1914, London: Methuen, 1938.
- Joslen, H. F. (2003) [1960]. Orders of Battle: Second World War, 1939–1945. Uckfield, East Sussex: Naval and Military Press. ISBN 978-1-84342-474-1.
- Falls, Cyril; A. F. Becke (maps) (1930). Military Operations Egypt & Palestine from June 1917 to the End of the War. Official History of the Great War Based on Official Documents by Direction of the Historical Section of the Committee of Imperial Defence. Vol. 2 Part II. London: HM Stationery Office. OCLC 256950972.
- Edward M. Spiers, The Army and Society 1815–1914, London: Longmans, 1980, ISBN 0-582-48565-7.
- R.R. Thompson, The Fifty-Second (Lowland) Division 1914–1918, Glasgow: Maclehose, Jackson 1923/Uckfield: Naval & Military, 2004, ISBN 978-1-84342993-7.

== External sources ==
- Mark Conrad, The British Army, 1914 (archive site)
- The Long, Long Trail
- The Regimental Warpath 1914–1918 (archive site)
