= Theodore Stephenson =

British Army general

Major-General Theodore Stephenson CB
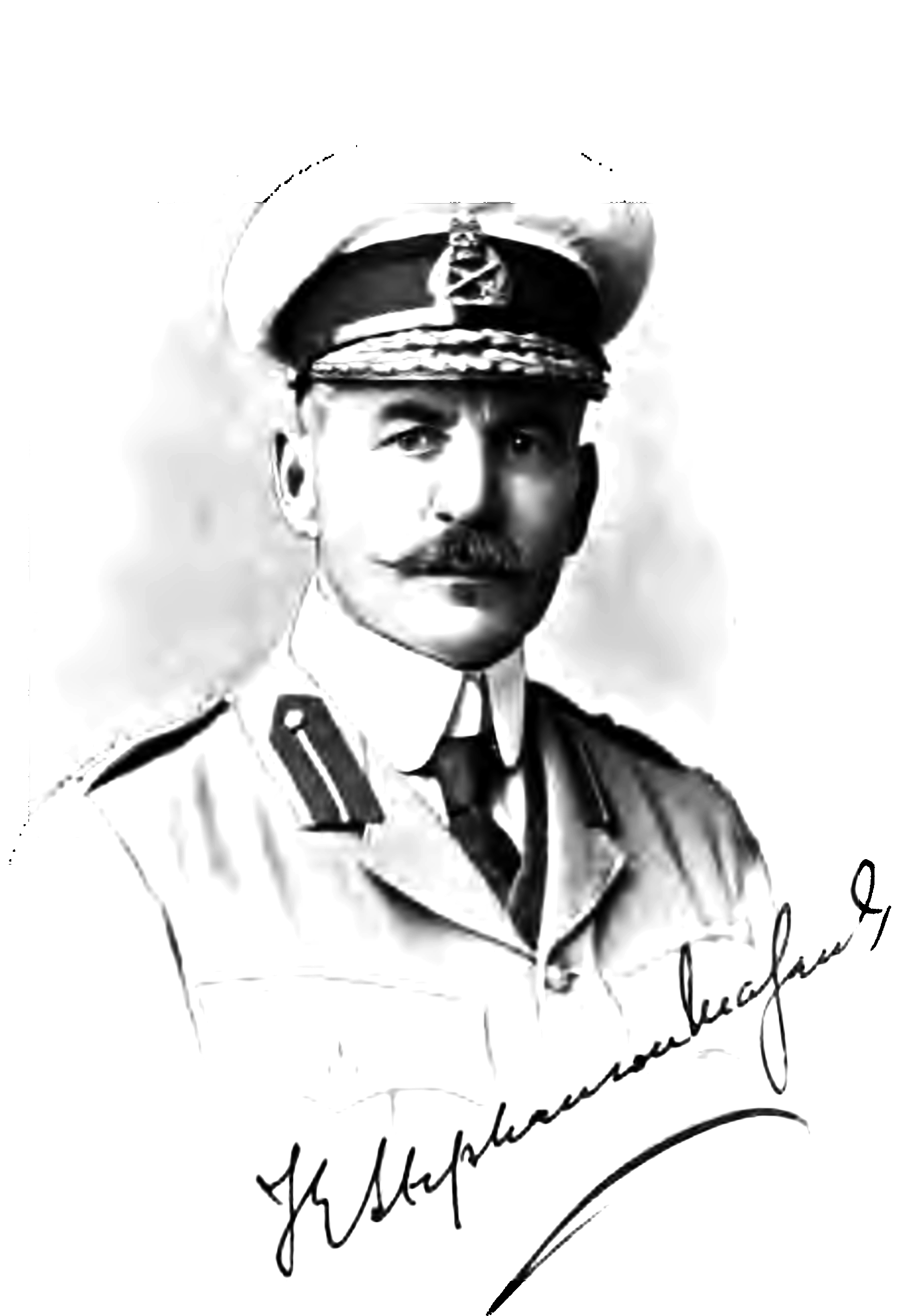
- Born: 1856; Weymouth, Dorset
- Died: 1928 (aged 71–72)
- Military career
- Allegiance: United Kingdom
- Branch: British Army
- Service years: 1874–1918
- Rank: Major-General
- Commands: 65th (2nd Lowland) Division (1916); Troops in the Straits Settlements (1910–1914); 2nd Division (1907–1910); 6th Division (1906–1907)
- Conflicts: Second Boer War; Zulu Rebellion; First World War
- Awards: Companion of the Order of the Bath; Mentioned in Despatches

Major-General Theodore Edward Stephenson, CB (1856–1928) was a British Army officer who commanded the 2nd Division from 1907 to 1910.

== Military career ==
Educated at Marlborough College, Stephenson was commissioned into the 56th Regiment of Foot in 1874.

He was promoted to captain in the Essex Regiment on 27 November 1883.

He was promoted to lieutenant colonel on 16 September 1895.

He served in the Second Boer War, which began in October 1899, and commanded a column in the attack on Plessis Poort. In his final despatch from South Africa in June 1902, Lord Kitchener, the commander-in-chief (C-in-C) of the forces during the latter part of the war, described Stephenson as "an excellent Officer, who has displayed good sense wherever he has been employed".

Following the end of the war in May 1902, he stayed on in South Africa for several months with a staff appointment and the local rank of major general.

Stephenson also served in the Zulu Rebellion of 1905 and became General Officer Commanding 6th Division in November 1906, General Officer Commanding 2nd Division in 1907, and commander of the Troops in the Straits Settlements in 1910.

He served in the First World War as General Officer Commanding 65th (2nd Lowland) Division before retiring from the army on 28 March 1918.

== Family ==
Stephenson married Philippa Watson.

Military offices
Preceded by Arthur Wynne	General Officer Commanding 6th Division; 1906–1907	Succeeded by Lawrence Parsons
Preceded by Bruce Hamilton	General Officer Commanding 2nd Division; 1907–1910	Succeeded by Henry Lawson
Preceded by Thomas Perrott	General Officer Commanding Troops in the Straits Settlements; 1910–1914	Succeeded by Raymond Reade
Preceded by Lord Erroll	General Officer Commanding 65th (2nd Lowland) Division; 1916	Succeeded by George Forestier-Walker
