= 1st Lanarkshire Rifle Volunteers =

1st Lanarkshire Rifle Volunteers 5th Bn Cameronians (Scottish Rifles) 56th (5th Cameronians) S/L Regiment, RA 125th (Cameronians) Light AA Regiment, RA 591 (Cameronians) LAA/SL Regiment, RA 445 (Cameronians) LAA Regiment, RA
- Active: 1859–1967
- Country: United Kingdom
- Branch: Territorial Army
- Role: Infantry; Air Defence
- Part of: Scottish Rifles Brigade; 19th Brigade; 52 LAA Brigade; 76 AA Brigade
- Garrison/HQ: Glasgow
- Engagements: Second Boer War; World War I: Somme; Arras; Third Ypres; German spring offensive; Hundred Days; World War II: Battle of Britain; The Blitz; North West Europe

The 1st Lanarkshire Rifle Volunteers was a Scottish Volunteer unit of the British Army. Originally raised in Glasgow as part of the Highland Light Infantry from 1859, it later became a battalion of the Cameronians (Scottish Rifles). During World War I it served on the Western Front and in Ireland. Converted into an anti-aircraft regiment just before World War II, it served during The Blitz and in the campaign in North West Europe, and continued in air defence role in the postwar years until 1955.

== Origin ==
An invasion scare in 1859 led to the emergence of the Volunteer Movement, and Rifle Volunteer Corps (RVCs) began to be organised throughout Great Britain. The first drill meeting of the 1st Lanarkshire (or Glasgow 1st Western) Rifle Volunteer Corps was held in the playground of The Glasgow Academy in Elmbank Street, Glasgow, on 27 July 1859. Its services as one company were offered on 5 August and were accepted on 24 September 1859, with Sir Archibald Campbell of Succoth, 3rd Baronet (1825–66), as Captain. The unit was entirely self-supporting, with all its expenses paid by its members.

On 28 February 1860 the 1st Lanarkshire RVC was expanded by the amalgamation of a number of the smaller RVCs that had sprung into existence in Glasgow, with Sir Archibald Campbell promoted to Lieutenant-Colonel Commandant on 6 March. In June 1860 it was divided into two battalions:

1st Battalion

- No 1 Company – from 1st (Glasgow 1st Western) Lanarkshire RVC
- No 2 Company – from 9th (Glasgow 1st Bankers) Lanarkshire RVC, recruited from members of the banking profession, with several of the banks subscribing towards the arms and equipment of the members, services accepted 10 October 1859
- No 3 Company – from 11th (Glasgow 2nd Western) Lanarkshire RVC, services accepted 4 November 1859
- No 4 Company – from 15th (Procurators) Lanarkshire RVC, formed after a meeting at the Faculty Hall on 23 September 1859 by members of the legal profession, services accepted 5 December 1859
- No 5 Company – from 17th (Stockbrokers and Accountants) Lanarkshire RVC, recruited from men employed in stockbrokers' and accountants' offices with an initial financial contribution from the Glasgow Stock Exchange and the Glasgow Institute of Accountants and Actuaries, services accepted 5 December 1859
- No 6 Company – from 33rd (1st Partick) Lanarkshire RVC, a self-supporting company recruited in the Partick Division of Glasgow, services accepted 22 December 1859
- No 7 Company – from 39th Lanarkshire RVC, recruited from employees of shipping companies, services accepted 29 December 1859
- No 8 Company – from 79th (Glasgow 3rd Western) Lanarkshire RVC, services accepted 29 March 1860

2nd Battalion

- No 9 Company – from 2nd (University of Glasgow) Lanarkshire RVC, recruited from professors, graduates and students of Glasgow University, services accepted 24 September 1859
- No 10 Company – from 18th Lanarkshire RVC, recruited from employees of Messrs Wylie & Lochhead, a Glasgow firm of furnishers and undertakers, with Robert Downie Wylie as captain, John Wylie as lieutenant, and William Lochhead as ensign, services accepted 5 December 1859
- No 11 Company – from 50th (1st Press Corps) Lanarkshire RVC, recruited from newspaper employees and pressmen, services accepted 10 January 1860
- No 12 Company – from 53rd Lanarkshire RVC, recruited from employees of the warehousing, general wholesale and retail drapery firms and J & W Campbell Ltd, with a financial contribution from J.W. Campbell, services accepted 30 January 1860
- No 13 Company – from 63rd Lanarkshire RVC, recruited from employees of the baking, grain and provisions trades, whose firms contributed financially, services accepted 22 February 1860, joined 1st Corps March 1860
- No 14 Company – from 72nd (Fine Arts) Lanarkshire RVC, recruited from Glasgow jewellers, silversmiths, engravers, watch and clockmakers, services accepted 17 February 1860, joined 1st Corps March 1860
- No 15 Company – from 76th (Port Dundas) Lanarkshire RVC, recruited from men working in the wharves, stores, distilleries, sawmills and sugar works at Port Dundas, services accepted 26 March 1860, joined 1st Corps April 1860
- No 16 Company – from 77th (City Rifle Guard or 2nd University) Lanarkshire RVC – had existed for a few months as a drill class at Glasgow University, but recruits were mainly from the mercantile community, services accepted 8 March 1860, joined 1st Corps in April 1860

The ranks of the 1st and 2nd Western Companies provided many officers for other RVCs. Henry Campbell-Bannerman, a future prime minister, served as lieutenant in the 53rd RVC, becoming captain in 1867; he was a nephew of the founder of J. & W Campbell and was a partner in the firm.

After his death in 1866, Sir Archibald Campbell was succeeded as Lt-Col Commandant by his brother, Sir George Campbell, 4th Baronet, formerly a captain in the Royal Dragoons.

In 1863 No 1 Company as disbanded and No 14 was absorbed into No 15. The following year No 7 Company was absorbed into No 3 and the companies were lettered, A to G for 1st Bn, K to Q (omitting O) for 2nd Bn. In 1870, K company, the old University Company, was absorbed into Q Company, the old 77th, which also had its origins in Glasgow University. New K and O Companies were added in 1878, K being relettered I and new H and K Companies being raised in 1881.

The corps carried out its first drills on Burnbank Park in Great Western Road, Glasgow, building a drill hall there in 1866–7. Later it built a new headquarters (HQ) at 261 West Princes Street. By 1881 the HQ was at 242 West George Street.

== Localisation ==
Under the 'Localisation of Forces' scheme introduced in 1872 by the Cardwell reforms, the 1st Lanarkshire RVC was grouped with the 26th (Cameronian) Regiment of Foot, the 74th (Highland) Regiment of Foot, the 1st Royal Lanark Militia and a number of other Lanarkshire RVCs in Brigade No 59. When these were combined under the Childers Reforms of 1881, the 1st Lanarkshire RVC became the senior Volunteer Battalion of the new Cameronians (Scottish Rifles), without changing its title. The Stanhope Memorandum of December 1888 introduced a Mobilisation Scheme for Volunteer units, which would assemble in their own brigades at key points in case of war. In peacetime these brigades provided a structure for collective training. Under this scheme the Lanarkshire battalions were included in the Clyde Brigade, later the Glasgow Brigade, based at 127 St Vincent Street, Glasgow, and later at Hamilton, South Lanarkshire.

One hundred and two volunteers from the battalion served with the 1st and 2nd Volunteer Service Companies of the Scottish Rifles and with the Imperial Yeomanry in the Second Boer War, earning its first Battle honour: South Africa 1900–02.

In 1902 the Glasgow Brigade was split up, and the four Volunteer Battalions of the Cameronians became the Scottish Rifles Brigade. The High School of Glasgow Cadet Corps of two companies was formed that year and affiliated to the 1st Lanarkshires.

== Territorial Force ==
When the Volunteers were subsumed into the new Territorial Force (TF) under the Haldane Reforms of 1908, the battalion became the 5th Battalion, Cameronians (Scottish Rifles). K Company (the University Company) became a contingent of the Senior Division of the Officers' Training Corps (OTC) and the High School Glasgow Cadet Corps joined the Junior Division of the OTC. The Scottish Rifles Brigade formed part of the Lowland Division of the TF.

== World War I ==
=== Mobilisation ===
The Lowland Division had been attending annual camp on the Ayrshire coast when the order to mobilise was received at 17.25 on Tuesday August 1914. On return from camp the 5th Scottish Rifles mobilised at 261 West Princes Street and then undertook guards and patrols at vulnerable points around Glasgow and the River Clyde. The division completed its mobilisation by 10 August and proceeded to its war stations in the Forth Defences, with the Scottish Rifles Bde at Falkirk and 5th Bn at Larbert. The troops were billeted in all manner of buildings.

=== Recruitment ===
On 10 August, units of the division were invited to volunteer for Overseas Service, and the majority did so. On 31 August, the War Office authorised the formation of a reserve or 2nd Line unit for each unit where 60 per cent or more of the men had volunteered for Overseas Service. The titles of these 2nd Line units would be the same as the 1st Line original, but distinguished by a '1/' or '2/' prefix. In this way duplicate battalions, brigades and divisions were created, mirroring those TF formations being sent overseas. Where recruitment was good, they also formed 3rd Line units

=== 1/5th Scottish Rifles ===
The First Line battalion was one of the first TF units selected to reinforce the Regulars of the British Expeditionary Force (BEF) in France and soon left the Lowland Division. It landed at Le Havre on 5 November 1914, joining 19th Brigade on 19 November. At this time 19th Bde (which included 1st Bn Cameronians (Note: The 33rd Division's historian usually refers to 1st Bn as 'Cameronians' and 5th Bn as 'Scottish Rifles', which may reflect the battalions' preferences as to titles; the Official Histories use Scottish Rifles for both.)) had just been relieved from the line following very heavy fighting in the Battle of Armentières. Although an independent brigade, it was attached to 6th Division.

After a winter of trench warfare, from 31 May 1915, 19th Bde was attached to 27th Division (another Regular formation that had suffered heavy casualties in the 2nd Battle of Ypres). On 19 August 1915, 19th Bde transferred again to 2nd Division, this time as an integral part of the division.

2nd Division was preparing for the forthcoming Battle of Loos. On 25 September it was to assault the enemy trenches south of the La Bassée Canal, preceded by a 40-minute discharge of poison gas. 19th Brigade's attack would be assisted by two mines blown under the German lines by 173rd Tunnelling Company, Royal Engineers. However, the mines were ordered to be blown 10 minutes before the brigade's attack, giving the German defenders plenty of time to prepare. Many of the attackers were also affected by the British gas cloud being blown back on them by the inconsistent winds. The leading battalions failed to get into the enemy position, and the attack was halted before 1/5th Scottish Rifles in reserve actually went 'over the top'.

On 25 November 1915, 19th Bde was transferred to 33rd Division, a 'Kitchener's Army' formation that had just arrived in France. At the end of December the new division took over 2nd Division's section of the line at La Bassée, facing the intricate trench system around the canal, the 'Brickstacks' (a German strongpoint built into the stacks of the La Bassée brickworks), and the villages of Cuinchy and Cambrin. This was considered a quiet sector, but an excellent training ground in trench warfare, with continuous mining activity and occasional trench raids.

On 29 May 1916 the battalion merged with merged with 6th Scottish Rifles to form the 5th/6th Battalion. (6th Battalion had left the Lowland Division in March 1915 and served with a number of divisions in France, including a period as a pioneer battalion, before joining 100th Bde in 33rd Division.)

=== 5th/6th Scottish Rifles ===
==== Somme ====
After five months of familiarisation with trench warfare, 33rd Division saw its first fullscale operations during the Somme Offensive as part of XV Corps. It began to move south by train on 10 July and was in Corps Reserve during the Battle of Albert (12–13 July) before being committed to action during the Battle of Bazentin Ridge. XV Corps had taken most of its objectives on 14 July, but High Wood and Delville Wood remained in enemy hands. Next day, 19th Brigade remained in reserve while the rest of 33rd Division assaulted Switch Trench. This attack was a failure, the infantry returning to their starting positions. On the morning of 16 July 19th Bde relieved 100th Bde, and at dawn on 20 July it renewed the attack. 5th/6th Scottish Rifles were drawn up alongside 1st Cameronians just outside the British wire and attacked High Wood, preceded by a line of scouts and supported by Royal Engineers and divisional Pioneers. The attack began satisfactorily, prisoners being taken, but German machine gun nests inflicted serious casualties and the advance was held up. The brigade commander threw in his remaining troops and by the end of the day 19th Bde held the rest of the wood in its front. The Switch Line beyond was not finally captured until 27 September, and in the meantime the casualties suffered in holding the positions in High Wood under shellfire were heavy. 33rd Division was relieved from the line in early August, returning to High Wood for a new attack on 24 August for which 19th Bde was in reserve. The division was sent for rest at the end of September.

The division returned to the Somme sector on 22 October to take part in a new series of attacks in the area of 'Dewdrop' and 'Boritska' Trenches. On 3–4 November 19 Brigade attacked 'Hazy' Trench and took the 'Gun Pits', even though heavy artillery could not be used in support because of the uncertainty of the exact positions of friendly and enemy troops. Supplies had to be manhandled to the front line across 5,000 yards (4,600 m) of thick mud. The division then took over a section of line from the French and garrisoned this during the winter.

==== Arras ====
In March 1917 33rd Division was withdrawn to train for the Arras offensive. After initial successes in early April, the BEF attempted to continue the advance towards the Hindenburg Line by raids and strong patrols. 19th Brigade was detached on 12 April to assist 21st Division in attacks on 13 and 15/16 April. These attacks were unsuccessful, but 19th Bde was firmly established in the forward part of the Hindenburg Line when the rest of 33rd Division took over the front. Casualties during the subsequent fighting were heavy.

==== Third Ypres ====
33rd Division spent the summer on the Flanders coast defending the Nieuport sector before being moved to the Ypres Salient in September to join in the Third Ypres Offensive. The division was due to attack at dawn on 26 September and moved into position during the night of 24/25 September, with 19th Bde in reserve, but it was itself heavily attacked on the morning of 25 September. Despite being driven from many positions and suffering severe casualties, the division was able to play some part in the patched-up attack (the Battle of Polygon Wood) the following day, recapturing its original line and establishing advanced posts in the first objective.

The division was withdrawn from Polygon Wood for a short rest, then took over the defence of the Passchendaele Salient in November in the worst of Flanders mud. 5th/6th Scottish Rifles was particularly aggressive with its patrols during the winter, forcing the enemy to give up possession of the 'Gasometers'.

==== Spring Offensive ====
The German spring offensive opened on 21 March 1918, and 33rd Division was sent south as reinforcements, concentrating in the Arras area by 8 April. When the second phase of the offensive broke through further north (the Battle of the Lys) the division moved to cover the important transport hub of Hazebrouck. 19th Brigade took up positions covering the approaches to Méteren, where patrols on 12 April found the Germans driving broken British units westwards. The line was held by machine gunners and groups of these stragglers, then at dusk the 5th/6th Scottish Rifles arrived to stabilise the front. The line held during 13 April, then the next day a gap appeared to the battalion's left, towards the eastern edge of Meteren. Once again, a defence line was restored, with the help of divisional machine gunners and a New Zealand entrenching battalion. This line was strengthened on 15 April with the help of Royal Engineers and divisional cyclists. 19th Brigade was relieved that night.

The fighting was still going on when 33rd Division relieved French troops east of Dickebusch Lake on 6 May. It took over a line running to Scottish Wood and Ridge Wood, an area that had been in the rear area of the Ypres Salient, but was now the front line and was threatened by the Germans who had captured Mont Kemmel. The Germans began a bombardment of the position at 03.30 on 8 May followed by an attack at 07.30 that gained a lodgement in Ridge Wood. 19th Brigade came up at 10.00 to restore the position, and a second German attack was stopped. The divisional commander now ordered 5th/6th Scottish Rifles to recapture Ridge Wood. The battalion moved from the right of the division, behind Dickebusch Lake where it was screened by trees, and the CO, Lt-Col H.B. Spens, then carefully deployed and 'launched a most energetic counter-attack, carried out with outstanding valour and enterprise'.

==== Hundred Days Offensive ====
After the Battle of the Lys, 33rd Division spent several months in the Ypres sector before being relieved by US troops at the end of August and going for training. By the time it re-entered the line in the Cambrai sector the Allied Hundred Days Offensive was well under way. It was ordered to make a preparatory attack on the outer defences of the Hindenburg Line on 21 September. At dawn 19th Bde advanced on the right, but machine gunners of the German Alpenkorps inflicted heavy casualties on 5th/6th Scottish Rifles and other assaulting battalions and they were driven back. During the night, 5th/6th Scottish Rifles' second-in-command, Major C.C. Scott, led a successful surprise attack that seized 'Gloucester Road' trench and the troublesome 'Meath Post' strongpoint, and held on against counter-attacks until relieved.

Having prepared the way for the Battle of St Quentin Canal (29 September), 33rd Division's role was simply to occupy ground from which the outflanked enemy were expected to retire. However, although the main attack was successful, the enemy facing the division did not budge until the following day, when patrols pushed forwards to the canal bank.

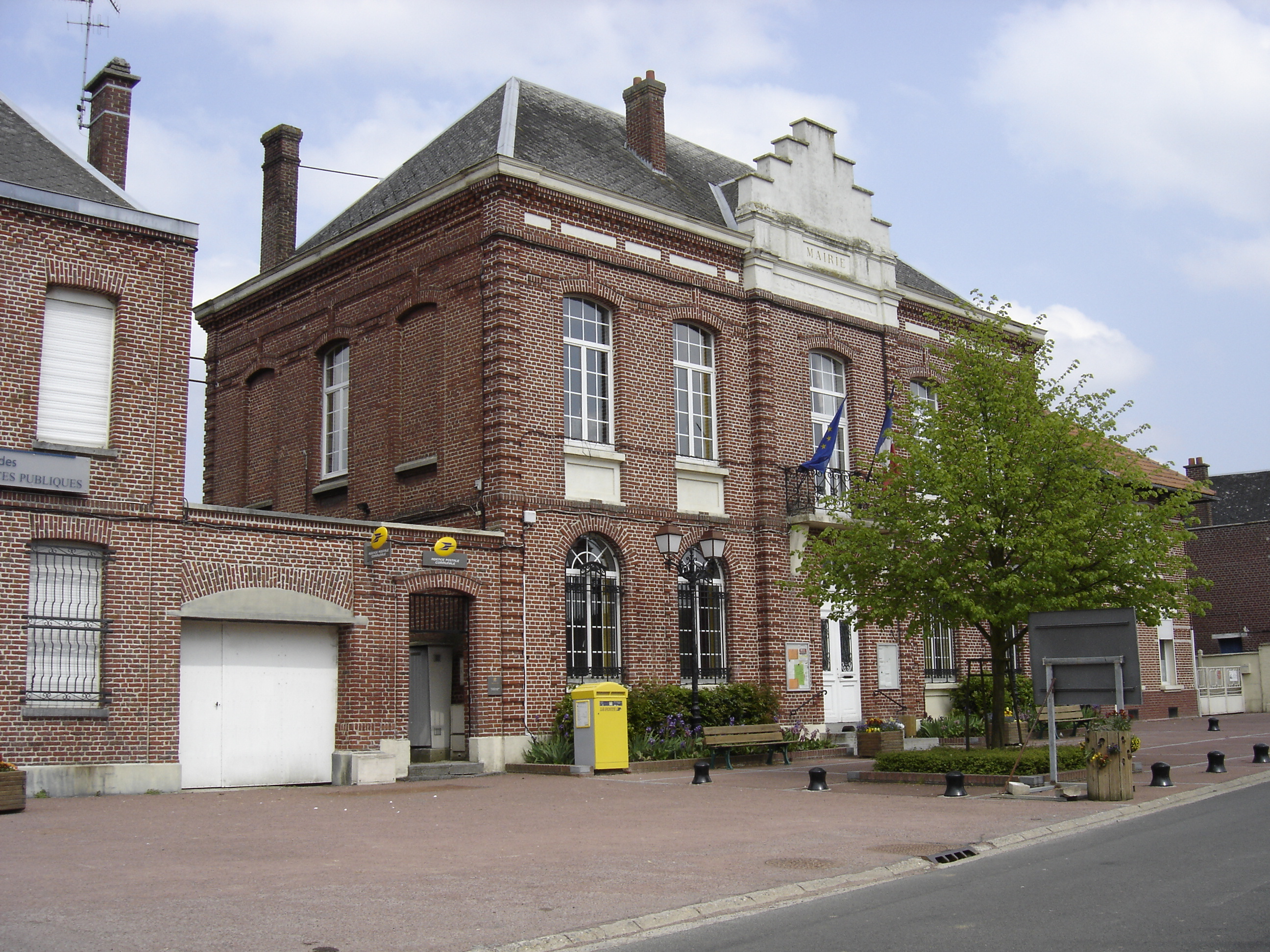
Clary mairie today.

33rd Division crossed the canal without opposition on 5 October. Ordered to pursue towards the River Selle on 8 October, 19th Brigade advanced without an artillery barrage, but accompanied by field artillery, machine guns, engineers and cavalry, capturing several German guns while 5th/6th Scottish Rifles cleared the village of Clary. The division covered 7 1/2 miles in the day. The Selle was the next major German defence line; 33rd Division closed up to it on 11 October and established bridgeheads.

After a pause to prepare for a major offensive, the Battle of the Selle, 33rd Division crossed the river in strength on 22 October and launched its attack at 02.00 on 23 October, with 5th/6th Scottish Rifles leading 19th Bde on the left. The German defences consisted of a line of Rifle pits supported by machine guns, but the battalion overcame all resistance and reached the first objective by about 03.30. The barrage lifted at 03.52 for the next bound, and the battalion took the second objective by 07.00. The rest of the brigade then passed through to take the third objective against weak opposition, but were held up before the final objective. 19th Brigade, accompanied by Royal Engineers, continued the attack the following morning, reaching the outskirts of Englefontaine. On the night of 25 October this village was taken by a pincer movement, 19th Bde working round the high ground to its north.

The BEF's last major attack of the war was the Battle of the Sambre. On 4 November, 33rd Division bivouacked in the Forêt de Mormal, then on 5 November it passed through the 37th Division to the attack, making rapid progress, despite the cratered roads and fallen trees. The division crossed the Sambre by raft bridges next day, and in the evening 19th Bde took up the pursuit, liberating Pot de Vin the following morning. By the end of 7 November the brigade had reached the Maubeuge–Avesnes road, when the 38th (Welsh) Division took over the pursuit.

When the Armistice with Germany came into effect at 11.00 on 11 November, 33rd Division was camped in the Sambre Valley near Leval. Although the final operations were successful, casualties had been heavy, and the division had also been badly affected by the Spanish flu pandemic. It moved back to Hornoy-le-Bourg, in the Somme area for the winter. Demobilisation got under way in January 1919, and the last cadres returned to the UK by the end of June. 5th/6th Scottish Rifles was disembodied on 18 November 1919.

=== 2/5th Scottish Rifles ===
The 2nd Line battalion was formed in Glasgow in September 1914. The 2nd Line Lowland Divisional and Brigade HQs began to form in January 1915, but it was some time before the various formations and units were assembled from their depots. Training was held up both by the lack of modern arms and equipment, and the need to supply reinforcement drafts to the 1st Line. By August, however, the division was substantially complete and stationed at Bridge of Allan with the 2nd Scottish Rifles Brigade at Cambusbarron, when they were officially numbered 65th (2nd Lowland) Division and 195th (2/1st Scottish Rifles) Brigade respectively.

In November 1915 the 2/5th Scottish Rifles absorbed the 2/8th Battalion. At this time the infantry battalions in the 64th (2nd Highland) and 65th (2nd Lowland) Divisions were numbered sequentially, with 2/5th Scottish Rifles becoming No 17 Battalion. In January 1916 it had reverted to its previous designation, but had absorbed 2/7th Bn. In March 1916 the division moved to Essex and joined Southern Army (Home Forces), 195th Bde being quartered around Billericay and then from July at Terling.

In January 1917 65th (2nd Lowland) Division moved to Ireland to relieve 59th (2nd North Midland) Division, which had been the first TF formation to serve in that country. At first 2/5th Bn was stationed at Moore Park (Fermoy), and a year later at Galway. The battalion was disbanded at Tralee on 15 May 1918.

=== 3/5th Scottish Rifles ===
A 3rd Line or reserve battalion was formed at Glasgow in November 1914. On 8 April 1916 it was redesignated 5th Reserve Bn, Scottish Rifles, and on 1 September 1916, when it was at Catterick Camp in North Yorkshire, it absorbed the 6th, 7th and 8th Reserve Bns of the regiment and formed part of the Lowland Reserve Brigade. Later it returned to Scotland, being stationed at Galashiels and Hawick. By December 1917 it was at Leven as part of the Forth Garrison. It was disbanded at Bridge of Allan on 31 December 1918.

=== 15th Scottish Rifles ===
In 1915 the Home Service men of the 5th, 6th and 7th Scottish Rifles were combined into 10th Scottish Provisional Battalion, which joined the Scottish Provisional Brigade (later 1st Provisional Brigade) on 22 May. In April 1916 the 1st Provisional Bde moved from Scotland to Kent to take over coastal defence duties, with 10th Bn stationed at Deal. The same month the battalion absorbed the 12th Scottish Provisional Bn, formed from Home service men of the 4th and 5th Bns Kings Own Scottish Borderers. The Military Service Act 1916 swept away the Home/Foreign service distinction, and all TF soldiers became liable for overseas service, if medically fit. The Provisional Brigades thus became anomalous, and at the end of 1916 the remaining battalions were formed into numbered battalions of their parent units in new Mixed Brigades and Home Service Divisions. 10th Provisional Bn became 15th Bn Scottish Rifles on 1 January 1917, while 1st Provisional Brigade became 221st Infantry Brigade (later 221st Mixed Brigade). Part of the role of these home defence units alongside the Training Reserve was physical conditioning to render men fit for drafting overseas. 15th Scottish Rifles continued in this role until the end of the war, and was disbanded on 30 July 1919.

== Interwar ==
The TF was reconstituted on 7 February 1920 when the 5th Cameronians reformed at Princes Street, with Lt-Col H.B. Spens, DSO in command. In 1921 the TF was reorganised as the Territorial Army (TA). In that year the 5th Bn absorbed the 8th Cameronians, becoming 5th/8th Battalion The Cameronians (Scottish Rifles). The battalion formed part of 156th (West Scottish) Bde of 52nd (Lowland) Division. It also had affiliated to it 5th The Cameronians (Scottish Rifles) Cadet Battalion.

=== Anti-Aircraft conversion ===
90 cm 'Projector Anti-Aircraft', displayed at Fort Nelson, Hampshire.

During the 1930s the increasing need for anti-aircraft (AA) defence for Britain's cities was addressed by converting a number of TA infantry battalions into AA units. The 5th/8th Cameronians was one of the battalions selected, becoming a Royal Artillery searchlight (S/L) regiment in late 1938 while remaining affiliated with the Cameronians. At the same time, the TA was doubled in size following the Munich Crisis, so two regiments were formed:

- 5th Bn Cameronians (Scottish Rifles) (56th Searchlight Regiment)
  - 417–420 Searchlight Batteries
- 8th Bn Cameronians (Scottish Rifles) (57th Searchlight Regiment)
  - 421–424 Searchlight Batteries

Thus the 8th Bn (57th S/L Rgt) once more had its own identity and history. In the event, only three batteries were formed in 5th Bn (56th S/L Rgt) at 261 West Prince's St (HQ, 419, 418 and 419 Btys), 420 being formed in 57th S/L Rgt.

== World War II ==
=== Mobilisation ===
The regiment formed part of 3 AA Division covering Scotland. In February 1939 the existing AA defences came under the control of a new Anti-Aircraft Command. In June a partial mobilisation of TA units was begun in a process known as 'couverture', whereby each AA unit did a month's tour of duty in rotation to man selected AA and searchlight positions. On 24 August, ahead of the declaration of war, AA Command was fully mobilised at its war stations. 5th Cameronians (56th S/L Rgt) became part of 52nd Light Anti-Aircraft Brigade, which was formed in August 1939 with responsibility for all of 3 AA Division's S/L provision.

=== 56th (5th Battalion, Cameronian Scottish Rifles) Searchlight Regiment ===
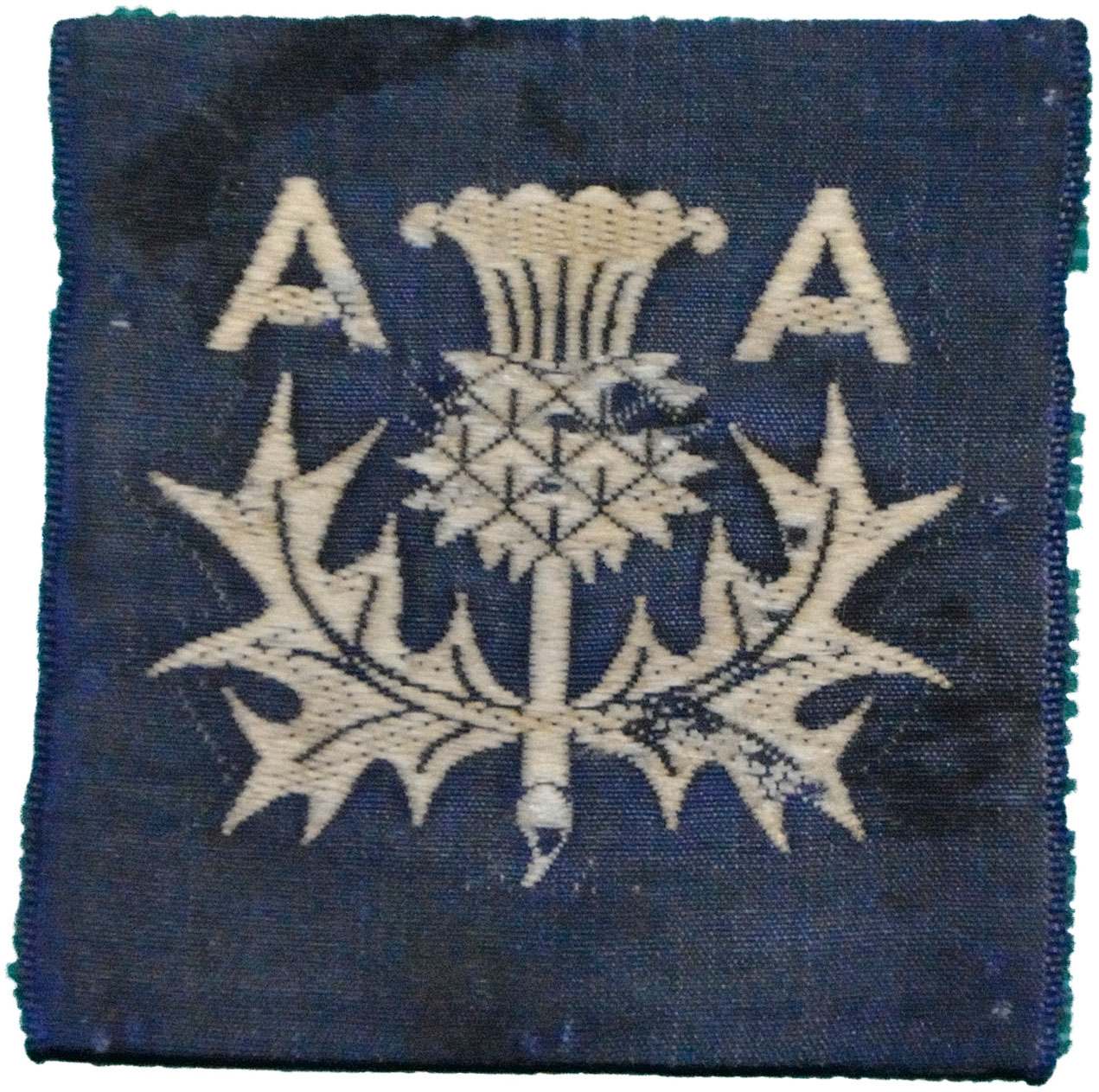
3 AA Divisional sign.

During the Phoney War period there were a number of attacks on the naval bases of Scotland before the Luftwaffe turned its attention to the campaigns in Norway and France and the Low Countries. In August 1940 the RA took over all the S/L regiments in AA Command, after which the regiment was designated 56th (5th Battalion, Cameronian Scottish Rifles) Searchlight Regiment, RA. The regiment supplied a cadre of experienced officers and men to 235th S/L Training Rgt at Ayr where it provided the basis for a new 531 S/L Bty formed on 14 November 1940. This battery later joined 52nd (Queen's Edinburgh, Royal Scots) S/L Rgt.

Eastern Scotland largely escaped air attack during the Battle of Britain. In November 1940, at the height of The Blitz, a new 12 AA Division was formed to take over responsibility for western Scotland (including Glasgow and the Clyde) while 3 AA Division (including 52 AA Bde and 56th S/L Rgt) retained responsibility for eastern Scotland.

This was still the situation on 11 February 1941 when the newly-formed 535 S/L Bty joined the regiment. This battery had been formed on 14 November at 237th Training Rgt at Holywood, County Down, by a cadre from 52nd S/L Rgt.

When the Blitz ended in May 1941 the Edinburgh area had escaped relatively lightly, though the nearby Rosyth Dockyard had been a target.

535 S/L Bty left the regiment on 23 January 1942 and transferred to 57th (8th Cameronian) S/L Rgt in 12 AA Division. Later in the war it took part in the Allied invasion of Italy as an independent S/L battery. 535 S/L Battery was replaced in 56th S/L Rgt by 357 S/L Bty transferred from 39th (Lancashire Fusiliers) S/L Rgt on 23 January 1942. 357 S/L Bty continued to wear its Lancashire Fusiliers badges.

=== 125th (Cameronians) Light Anti-Aircraft Regiment ===
By 1942, AA Command had more than enough S/L units, but was still seriously short of light anti-aircraft (LAA) gun units, and began a programme of converting S/L units (which also had the benefit of saving manpower). On 18 February 56th S/L Rgt was converted to the LAA role as 125th (Cameronians) LAA Rgt:

- 414 LAA Bty from 357 S/L Bty
- 417 LAA Bty from 417 S/L Bty
- 418 LAA Bty from 418 S/L Bty
- 419 LAA Bty from 419 S/L Bty

By the middle of June the regiment had completed its conversion and was assigned to 6 AA Bde in 6 AA Division (later 2 AA Group) in South East England.

414 LAA Bty left the regiment on 3 October and joined 144th LAA Rgt based in Northern Ireland. 125th (Cameronians) LAA Rgt transferred within 2 AA Gp to 27 (Home Counties) AA Bde in December 1942.

However, in the spring of 1943, 125th LAA became an unbrigaded regiment, later leaving AA Command entirely and joining 76 AA Bde, one of the formations under 21st Army Group earmarked for the planned invasion of Normandy (Operation Overlord).

The regiment with its three batteries, now designated a mobile unit, was at Toft Hall in Cheshire on 1 June 1943 when it came under the command of 76 AA Bde and began training for Overlord. During the summer months, it took part in various exercises on the South Coast of England, including practices with landing craft. In January 1944, 76 AA Bde moved to Essex, with 125th LAA Rgt established at Southend-on-Sea by the end of the month. Intensive training by units continued at firing camps and exercises around the country. By now the brigade had been joined by the lorries of 323rd Company Royal Army Service Corps (RASC) to provide mobility, with 1617 LAA Rgt Platoon assigned to 125th LAA Rgt. The standard organisation for a mobile LAA regiment in the forthcoming campaign would be three batteries (54 guns) equipped with towed or Self-Propelled (SP) Bofors 40 mm guns.

==== Normandy ====
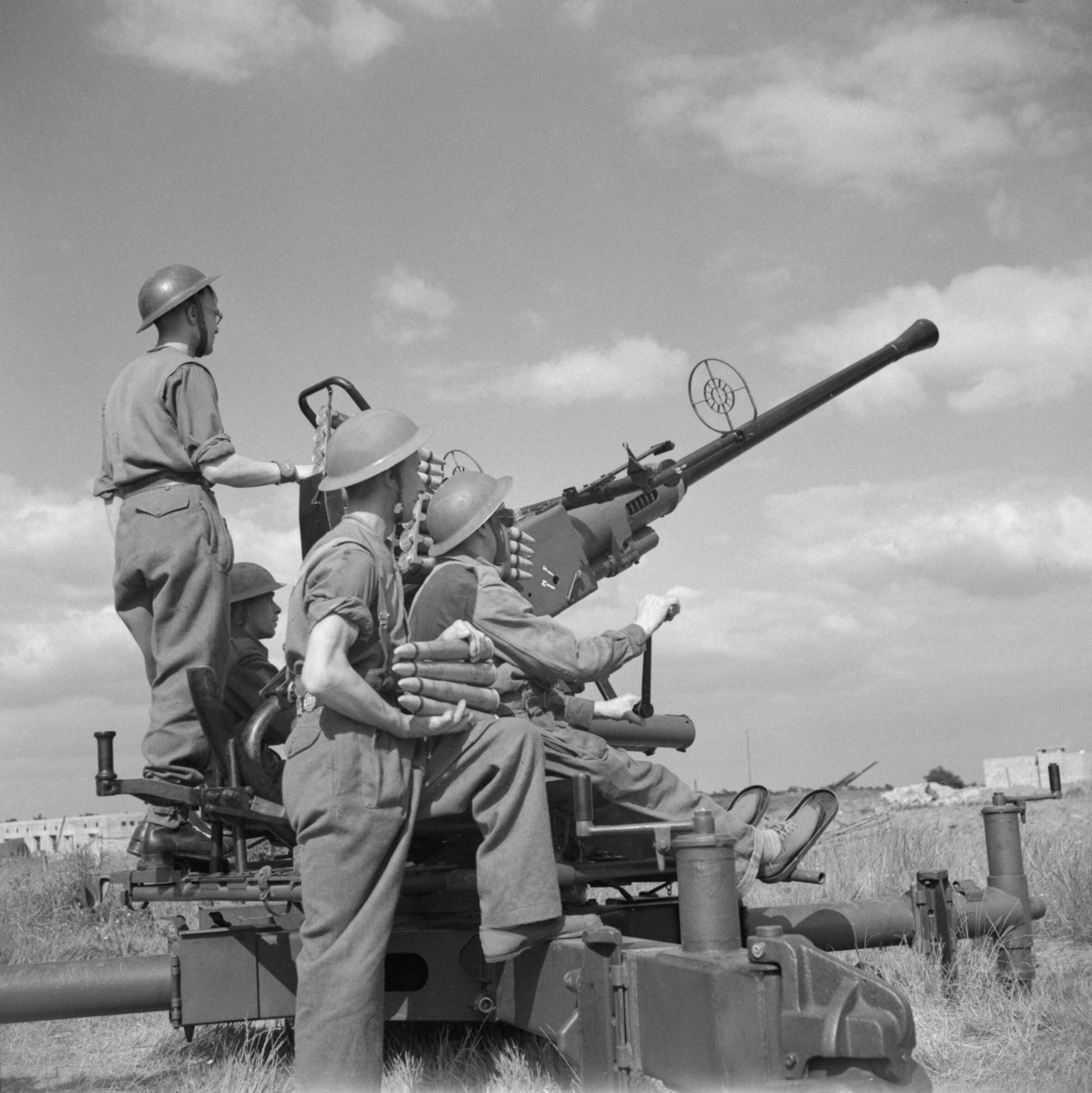
Bofors gun and crew, summer 1944

In May, those units required for the assault phase of Overlord began to gather in southern England and concentrated at Southend. Elements of 76 AA Bde landed on D-Day (6 June) itself, and follow-up units arrived over following days. 76 AA Brigade's role was to defend Gold Beach, the Mulberry Harbour being constructed at Arromanches, and the little harbour of Port-en-Bessin. RHQ of 125th LAA Rgt under Lt-Col J.S Gow landed in Normandy on the evening of 9 June and the reconnaissance party of 417 S/L Bty arrived the following day. The battery was ready for action at Arromanches by 13 June, followed by the other two batteries on 15 June (418 at Huppain, 419 at Escures). There were a number of night engagements of Luftwaffe bombers, but daylight activity was restricted to attacks by a few single-engined Fighter-bombers. The regiment's Z Group of rear-echelon troops arrived from England on 18 July, and the RASC lorries began to arrive on 22 July.

Following the Battle of Falaise, 21st Army Group began its break-out from the Normandy beachhead. On 27 August 419 LAA Bty handed over its towed Bofors guns to 73rd and 120th LAA Rgts, and received SP Bofors in exchange, ready to follow the advancing army. On 1 September it transferred to the operational command of 80 AA Bde, which moved up to cover the crossing of the Seine. Two batteries deployed to cover the bridging operations at Mantes-Gassicourt and one to Vernon; later it moved to the crossing at Les Andelys.

On 11 September the regiment returned to 76 AA Bde, which was in the Amiens area and scheduled to move up to cover the vital port of Antwerp, but this move was cancelled and the brigade went instead to join the siege of Boulogne (Operation Wellhit). It was withdrawn from Amiens on 22 September and reached Boulogne the following day, just as the siege ended.

On 19 October the regiment joined 107 AA Bde, which was supporting the Siege of Dunkirk, using HAA and LAA guns against ground targets, as well as against Luftwaffe aircraft attempting to drop supplies to the besieged garrison.

==== Antwerp ====
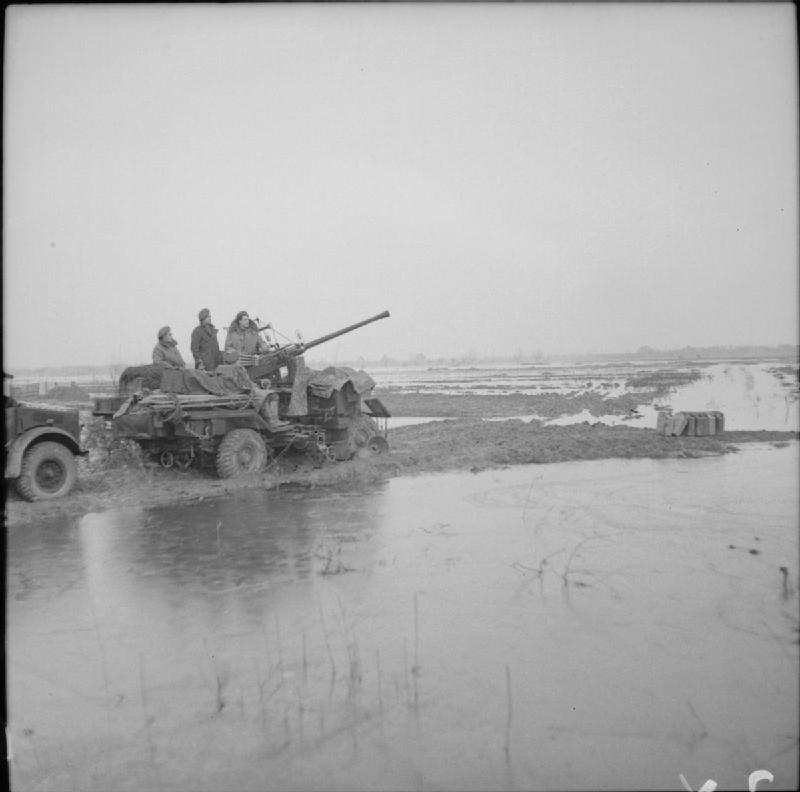
SP Bofors gun in Holland, December 1944.

The regiment was withdrawn from Dunkirk on 1 November and moved to rejoin 76 AA Bde defending Antwerp. A Gun Defence Area (GDA) covering the whole area of Antwerp and the Scheldt estuary was established, with 76 AA Bde responsible for the 'Scheldt North' sector. HAA positions were established at intervals of 4–5000 yards along the waterway, interspersed with irregularly sited LAA positions. 125th LAA Regiment was fully deployed by 4 November, with RHQ and the Royal Electrical and Mechanical Engineers (REME) workshop in the convent at Hoogerheide (later at Kapelle), 417 LAA Bty at Krabbendijke, 419 LAA Bty at Rilland Cloisters, and 418 LAA Bty in the countryside. 2nd S/L Rgt arrived on 17 November with the primary task of cooperating with the LAA guns against mine-laying in the channel. Lieutenant-Colonel Gow acted as brigade commander on occasions when the brigadier was absent. 125th LAA Regiment contributed personnel to a local warning radar troop that 76 AA Bde organised from its own resources

The only enemy aircraft seen in this period were on reconnaissance missions, usually flying very high. However, at the beginning of December 417 LAA battery was ordered to send A Trp to 4th Commando Brigade to defend the island of North Beveland against enemy shipping; C Trp joined it in early January 1945. When the German Army launched its Ardennes offensive (the Battle of the Bulge) aimed at breaking through to Antwerp, 76th AA Bde was ordered to take precautions against possible attacks by German airborne troops, as well as dealing with increased air activity; the night of 26/27 December was the busiest since the brigade arrived at the Scheldt.

On 1 January 1945, the Luftwaffe launched Operation Bodenplatte: daylight attacks against Allied airfields in support of the Ardennes offensive. Between 09.20 and 09.54 some 50–60 enemy aircraft, mainly Messerschmitt Bf 109 and Focke-Wulf Fw 190, came over 76th AA Bde's area. Its war diary records: 'This was the best day since our formation', with 15 aircraft claimed as 'certainly destroyed' and others probably crashed in enemy territory.

Antwerp was heavily attacked by V-1 flying bombs; on 26 February one of these landed in 417 LAA Bty's area, causing a number of casualties. As the war in Europe drew to its close, AA commitments in rear areas were reduced and units closed up to the Scheldt, where they were either sent forward into Germany (as AA or occupation troops) or prepared for disbandment. Several regiments were disbanded in April 1945, other were converted into garrison troops or driver training regiments. 125th LAA Rgt remained in 76th AA Bde's order of battle in the final weeks of the war.

The brigade was ordered to cease fire on 3 May 1945 when a local truce came into effect to allow supplies to be sent to civilians in enemy-occupied Holland (Operation Manna). This was followed on 4 May by the German surrender at Lüneburg Heath and the end of the war in Europe (VE Day).

==== Occupation duties ====
After VE Day, the brigade remained temporarily on its AA tasks. Its units then returned to the mainland from the Scheldt islands and concentrated north of Antwerp before moving into Germany in June to garrison the Dortmund–Bochum area. The units under command during this period included 125th LAA Rgt

By October the brigade had established its HQ at Burgsteinfurt Schloss under the command of 52nd (L) Division in British Army of the Rhine. As well as guarding vital points, it was responsible for camps containing 6000 disarmed former Wehrmacht soldiers and 9000 Displaced persons (DPs).

As the year progressed, units were progressively disbanded as the troops were demobilised. 125th (Cameronians) LAA Rgt was placed in suspended animation on 1 March 1946, completed on 9 April.

== Postwar ==
When the TA was reconstituted on 1 January 1947, the regiment reformed at Glasgow as 591st LAA Rgt (Cameronians). It formed part of 77 AA Bde (the wartime 51st LAA Bde) at Glasgow. On 16 March 1949 the regiment became 591st (Mixed) LAA/SL Rgt (Cameronians) ('Mixed' indicating that members of the Women's Royal Army Corps were integrated into the unit). On 1 June 1950 it absorbed 518th LAA/SL Rgt (the prewar 18th LAA Rgt formed at Glasgow in 1938) without change of title. On 1 October 1953 it dropped the S/L part of its title once more.

AA Command was disbanded on 10 March 1955 and there were wholesale amalgamations amongst its units. 591st (Cameronians) LAA Rgt amalgamated with 474th (City of Glasgow) HAA Rgt and 483rd (Blythswood) HAA Rgt to form 445th (Cameronians) LAA Rgt with the following organisation:

- P (Cameronians) Bty
- Q (Blythswood) Bty
- R (Glasgow) Bty

(474th HAA Rgt had previously absorbed 592nd (Glasgow) LAA Rgt, descended from 8th Bn Cameronians.)

On 1 May 1961 445th LAA Rgt absorbed Q (West Lothian, Royal Scots) Bty of 432nd LAA Rgt at Edinburgh and reorganised as 445th (Lowland) LAA Rgt:

- P (Cameronians) Bty
- Q (Glasgow and Blythswood) Bty
- R (West Lothian) Bty

Between 4 October 1961 and 18 March 1964 the regiment dropped the LAA part of its title, becoming 445th (Lowland) Regiment, RA, but later in 1964 it was designated a Light Air Defence Regiment. When the TA was reduced into the Territorial and Army Volunteer Reserve in 1967, the regiment was disbanded and became concurrently part of 207 (Scottish) Bty in 102 (Ulster and Scottish) LAD Rgt, and T (Glasgow) Bty in the Lowland Rgt, RA (Territorials).

== Uniform and Insignia ==
The various companies that were raised in 1859–60 had variations on Volunteer grey uniforms. However, after a vote in 1862 they all adopted 'Elcho grey' (Hodden grey) with blue facings, the blue collar and cuffs laced in grey with an Austrian knot on the sleeve, and blue piping on the trousers. The soft grey peaked cap had a diced blue-and-white band and a silver bugle badge. Yellow leggings were worn. From 1872 to 1876 a grey busby was adopted, but the grey cap was reintroduced until 1878 when a grey helmet with bronze fittings came into use. In 1902 a drab service dress with green Austrian knot and field grey cap was adopted. This was retained until the early 20th Century when it adopted the Rifle green uniform with dark green facings of the Scottish Rifles.

== Honorary Colonel ==
The following served as Honorary Colonel of the battalion:

- Sir James Bell, 1st Baronet, former Provost of Glasgow, appointed 7 October 1893
- J.A. Reid, VD, former CO, appointed 29 March 1903
- Warden R. Maxwell, VD, former CO (8th Bn), appointed 27 February 1904
- Sir William Alexander Smith. (Founder Of The Boys’ Brigade)
- A.A. Kennedy, DSO, OBE, appointed 29 September 1932

== Memorials ==
After World War I the Place de la Mairie in Clary was renamed Place des Ecossais to commemorate its liberation by 5th/6th Bn Scottish Rifles. When King George V visited Clary in November 1918, the battalion was drawn up in the place in his honour. Later a plaque was erected in the place.

The Cameronians War Memorial, commemorating all the regiment's battalions in World War I, sculpted by Philip Lindsey Clark, stands in Kelvingrove Park, Glasgow. There is also a plaque to all the Cameronian dead in World War I in Glasgow Cathedral.

== External sources ==
- Mark Conrad, The British Army, 1914 (archive site)
- British Army units from 1945 on
- Imperial War Museum, War Memorials Register
- The Long, Long Trail
- The Regimental Warpath 1914–1918 (archive site)
- Land Forces of Britain, the Empire and Commonwealth – Regiments.org (archive site)
- Royal Regiment of Artillery, Volunteer Regiments (archive site).
- Graham Watson, The Territorial Army 1947
- WW2 Talk
