= 4th (Glasgow, 1st Northern) Lanarkshire Rifle Volunteer Corps =

4th (Glasgow, 1st Northern) Lanarkshire RVC 8th Bn, Cameronians (Scottish Rifles) 57th (Cameronians) Searchlight Rgt, RA 147th (Glasgow) Light Anti-Aircraft Rgt, RA 592nd (Glasgow) Light Anti-Aircraft Rgt, RA
- Active: 10 October 1859 – 12 May 1950
- Country: United Kingdom
- Branch: Territorial Army
- Role: Infantry; Air Defence
- Part of: 52nd (Lowland) Division; 65th (2nd Lowland) Division; 3rd Anti-Aircraft Division; 12th Anti-Aircraft Division; 47th (London) Division
- Garrison/HQ: Glasgow
- Engagements: Second Boer War; Gallipoli Campaign; Sinai and Palestine Campaign; Western Front; The Blitz; Operation Diver

The 4th (Glasgow, 1st Northern) Lanarkshire Rifle Volunteer Corps was a Scottish Volunteer unit of the British Army. Originally raised in Glasgow in 1859, it later became a battalion of the Cameronians (Scottish Rifles). During World War I it served at Gallipoli (where it was practically wiped out in its first action), in Egypt and Palestine, and on the Western Front. Converted into an anti-aircraft regiment just before World War II, it served throughout the war and continued in an air defence role in the postwar years until 1950.

== Origin ==
The enthusiasm for the Volunteer movement following an invasion scare in 1859 saw the creation of many Rifle Volunteer Corps (RVCs) composed of part-time soldiers eager to supplement the Regular British Army in time of need. One such unit was the 4th (Glasgow, 1st Northern) Lanarkshire RVC, formed in Glasgow as one company. Its services were accepted on 10 October 1859 and on 12 December 1859 it absorbed several other RVCs formed in the Glasgow area, becoming a full battalion with the following organisation:

- A Company, from 4th (Glasgow, 1st Northern) Lanarkshire RVC
- B Company, from 6th Lanarkshire RVC, services accepted 10 October 1859
- C Company, from 7th Lanarkshire RVC, services accepted 10 October 1859
- D Company, from 8th Lanarkshire RVC, services accepted 10 October 1859
- E Company, from 12th (North Eastern) Lanarkshire RVC, recruited from employees of Tennent's Wellpark Brewery, services accepted 5 December 1859
- F Company, from 13th Lanarkshire RVC, recruited from the St Rollox district, services accepted 10 October 1859

Unusually, the battalion retained its original company subtitle 'Glasgow, 1st Northern' after consolidation and into the 1880s. Three kilted Highland companies were added to the battalion in July 1861:

- G Company, from 60th (Glasgow, 1st Highland) Lanarkshire RVC, services accepted 18 February 1860
- H Company, from 61st (Glasgow, 2nd Highland) Lanarkshire RVC, services accepted 18 February 1860
- I Company, from 93rd (Glasgow Highland Rangers) Lanarkshire RVC, services accepted 8 August 1860

In 1868 some 187 Highlanders were transferred from G, H and I Companies to a new 105th (Glasgow Highlanders) RVC, and the three companies adopted tunics and trews instead of doublets and kilts.

The battalion established its headquarters (HQ) at 138 Stirling Street, Glasgow, later at 149 Cathedral Street, with an 800 yards (730 m) rifle range at Flemington.

== Localisation ==
Under the 'Localisation of Forces' scheme introduced in 1872 by the Cardwell Reforms, the 4th Lanarkshire RVC was grouped with the 26th (Cameronian) Regiment of Foot, the 74th (Highland) Regiment of Foot, the 1st Royal Lanark Militia and a number of other Lanarkshire RVCs in Brigade No 59. When these were combined under the Childers Reforms, the 4th Lanarkshire RVC became a Volunteer Battalion of the new Cameronians (Scottish Rifles) on 1 July 1881, without changing its title until 1 December 1887, when it became 4th Volunteer Battalion of the regiment. The Stanhope Memorandum of December 1888 introduced a Mobilisation Scheme for Volunteer units, which would assemble in their own brigades at key points in case of war. In peacetime these brigades provided a structure for collective training. Under this scheme the Lanarkshire battalions were included in the Clyde Brigade, later the Glasgow Brigade, based at 127 St Vincent Street, Glasgow, and later at Hamilton, South Lanarkshire.

In 1893 the Kelvinside Academy Cadet Corps was formed, affiliated to the battalion.

Seventy-three volunteers from the battalion served in the Second Boer War, mostly in the 1st, 2nd and 3rd Volunteer Service Companies of the Scottish Rifles, earning the battalion its first Battle honour: South Africa 1900–02.

In 1902 the Glasgow Brigade was split up, and the four Volunteer Battalions of the Cameronians became the Scottish Rifle Brigade.

== Territorial Force ==
When the Volunteers were subsumed into the new Territorial Force (TF) under the Haldane Reforms of 1908, the battalion became the 8th Battalion, Cameronians (Scottish Rifles). Kelvinside Academy Cadet Corps became a contingent of the Junior Division of the Officers' Training Corps (OTC). The Scottish Rifles Brigade formed part of the Lowland Division of the TF.

== World War I ==
=== Mobilisation ===
The Lowland Division had been attending annual camp on the Ayrshire coast when the order to mobilise was received at 17.25 on Tuesday August 1914. On return from camp the 8th Scottish Rifles mobilised at 149 Cathedral Street and then undertook guards and patrols at vulnerable points around Glasgow and the River Clyde. The division completed its mobilisation by 10 August and proceeded to its war stations, with the battalion at Larbert in the Scottish Rifles Bde at Falkirk. The troops were billeted in all manner of buildings.

On 10 August, units of the division were invited to volunteer for Overseas Service, and the majority did so. On 31 August, the War Office authorised the formation of a reserve or 2nd Line unit for each unit where 60 per cent or more of the men had volunteered for Overseas Service. The titles of these 2nd Line units would be the same as the 1st Line original, but distinguished by a '1/' or '2/' prefix. In this way duplicate battalions, brigades and divisions were created, mirroring those TF formations being sent overseas. Where recruitment was good, they also formed 3rd Line units

=== 1/8th Scottish Rifles ===
The Lowland Division was warned for overseas service on 5 April 1915, and the infantry battalions received Long Lee Enfield rifles modified to take modern ammunition chargers. On 7 May the division was informed that it would be employed in the Gallipoli Campaign, and equipment such as sun helmets and water carts was issued. On 11 May the division was numbered as 52nd (Lowland) Division and the brigades also received numbers, the Scottish Rifles becoming 156th (Scottish Rifles) Brigade. As the leading battalion of the division, 1/8th Scottish Rifles under the command of Lt-Col H. Monteith Hannan, TD, boarded two trains from Falkirk to Devonport Dockyard where it embarked aboard HM Troopship Ballarat. It sailed on 18 May, arriving at Mudros on 29 May.

==== Gallipoli ====
While waiting at Mudros harbour the battalion sent two officers and 100 other ranks (ORs) ashore to act as a police picquet to guard the wells, keep the Australian troops in hand, and to prevent pilfering by the local inhabitants. The rest of the battalion sailed for Cape Helles on 13 June, part aboard the transport Osmanieh and part aboard Trawler No 328. It landed with the rest of 156th Bde next day at V Beach and was attached to the 29th Division, suffering some casualties from long-range Turkish artillery fire. On the night of 18/19 June it relieved the 1st Bn Essex Regiment in the front line at 'Rue de Paris'. Lt-Col Hannan was killed by a sniper on 21 June while watching nearby fighting from an artillery observation post. The battalion was relieved on 24/25 June and was rejoined by the police party from Mudros.

The battalion returned to the front line on 27 June and took part in the Battle of Gully Ravine on 28 June. After a bombardment by warships and the artillery ashore, 29th Division attacked at 11.00. 1/8th Scottish Rifles on 156th Bde's right had the task of assaulting trenches H12 and H12A on the eastern side of Gully Ravine. The battalion had a 12-man bombing party, but two-thirds of the improvised Jam tin grenades failed to go off. Each man had a tin rectangle on his back to reflect the sun and indicate their position to the artillery – but 156th Bde was allocated none of the available artillery support. Packed into inadequate jumping-off trenches, the brigade suffered heavily from retaliatory shellfire before it went 'over the top' at 11.02. On 1/8th Scottish Rifles' front, Nos 1 and 3 Companies advanced first, followed by No 2 Company. According to the divisional historian, 'they were simply mown down'. The battalion's acting commander, Major J.M. Findlay (who was wounded himself), later recorded that 'Five minutes after they had started they were practically wiped out'. Few men reached the enemy line, and they became casualties. No 4 Company, following behind, also lost heavily. The battalion's casualties were 14 officers and 334 ORs killed, missing, or mortally wounded (many dying when the dry grass caught fire later in the day), 11 officers and 114 ORs wounded. The following morning the battalion's strength stood at 3 officers and 70 men, and on 1 July it temporarily formed a composite battalion with 1/7th Scottish Rifles, which had been in reserve.

During July and August the weakened battalion took its turns of duty in the 'Eski Line', No 1 Company taking part in a successful small attack during 52nd (L) Division's costly attack on 12–13 July, following which it repulsed three counter-attacks. 156th Brigade made a new attack on 15 November, suffering casualties of 5 officers and 107 ORs, more than half of whom came from 1/8th Bn. Although 15 officers had arrived during July and August, no other reinforcements were received until 1 December when 3 officers and 78 ORs arrived. The battalion was evacuated from V Beach on 8 December and sailed for Mudros aboard HMS Prince George (which was hit by a torpedo that failed to explode).

==== Egypt ====
Shortly after 7th/8th Scottish Rifles were withdrawn, the whole Gallipoli force was evacuated, and 52nd (L) Division moved to Egypt, where the two battalions resumed their separate identities on 21 February. Once concentrated the division went to El Qantara and on 2 March 1916 it took over part of No 3 Section of the Suez Canal defences.

No 3 or Northern Section of the Canal defences had its outer flank anchored on the Mediterranean. Running inland were a series of redoubts manned by the infantry with machine guns and backed by artillery. On the night of 3/4 August a German and Turkish force attacked the position (the Battle of Romani). The redoubts came under heavy shelling and direct attack, but the attack was driven off by the British artillery. Attempts to outflank the Romani position were held by the ANZAC Mounted Division, and the defenders then moved to the counter-attack, though the pursuit bogged down in the appalling desert conditions of Sinai.

==== Palestine ====
After months of preparation the Eastern Expeditionary Force (EEF) crossed the Sinai Desert at the end of 1916 and prepared to invade Palestine, beginning the Sinai and Palestine Campaign. 52nd (L) Division was held in reserve during the 1st Battle of Gaza (26–27 March 1917) and was not committed. There followed several weeks of preparation for the 2nd Battle of Gaza. The first phase of the attack was carried out on 17 April, with 52nd (L) Division tasked with taking Ali Mansur and the adjoining hills. 156th Brigade was in reserve at Wadi Ghuzze, moving up during the night. On 19 April 156th Bde was ready to attack Mansura at 07.30 after a 2-hour bombardment, but 155th Bde got held up and 156th was pinned down, lying in the open for 5–6 hours and suffering casualties from shellfire. The 1/8th Scottish Rifles had to change their position several times. The battle ended on 20 April with both sides digging in, the 1/8th Scottish Rifles having suffered casualties of 2 officers and 30 ORs killed, 9 officers and 144 ORs wounded, and 17 ORs missing.

52nd (L) Division spent months digging defences, suffering a steady trickle of casualties from shellfire and in raids, one of which was mounted by 1/8th Scottish Rifles on 25/26 June. By the autumn of 1917 the EEF had been revitalised by the arrival of Sir Edmund Allenby as commander-in-chief, and the next operation (the 3rd Battle of Gaza, 31 October–7 November) was much better planned and successful. 52nd (L) Division down on the coast carried out a holding action while the Desert Mounted Corps swept round the Turkish flank. 1/4th (Queen's Edinburgh Rifles) Royal Scots attacked the formidable el Arish redoubt and the associated 'Little Devil' trench system, with 1/8th Scottish Rifles providing a support company and carrying companies. The Turks withdrew to defend the Wadi el Hesi, with 52nd (L) Division well up in pursuit. 156th Brigade was left marching in the rear as the rest of the division stormed the wadi and led the pursuit up the coast to Junction Station.

The EEF now began to advance on Jerusalem. 52nd (L) Division had to negotiate a poor road through the hills beyond Beit Liqya in heavy rain to join the Battle of Nebi Samwil. After the rest of the division took Beit 'Anan 156th Bde continued to make demonstrations while the EEF took Nabi Samwil. The Turks began a counter-offensive in late November, with the brigade strung out along a thin line, but the line was held. After breaking this counter-offensive, the EEF captured Jerusalem on 11 December.

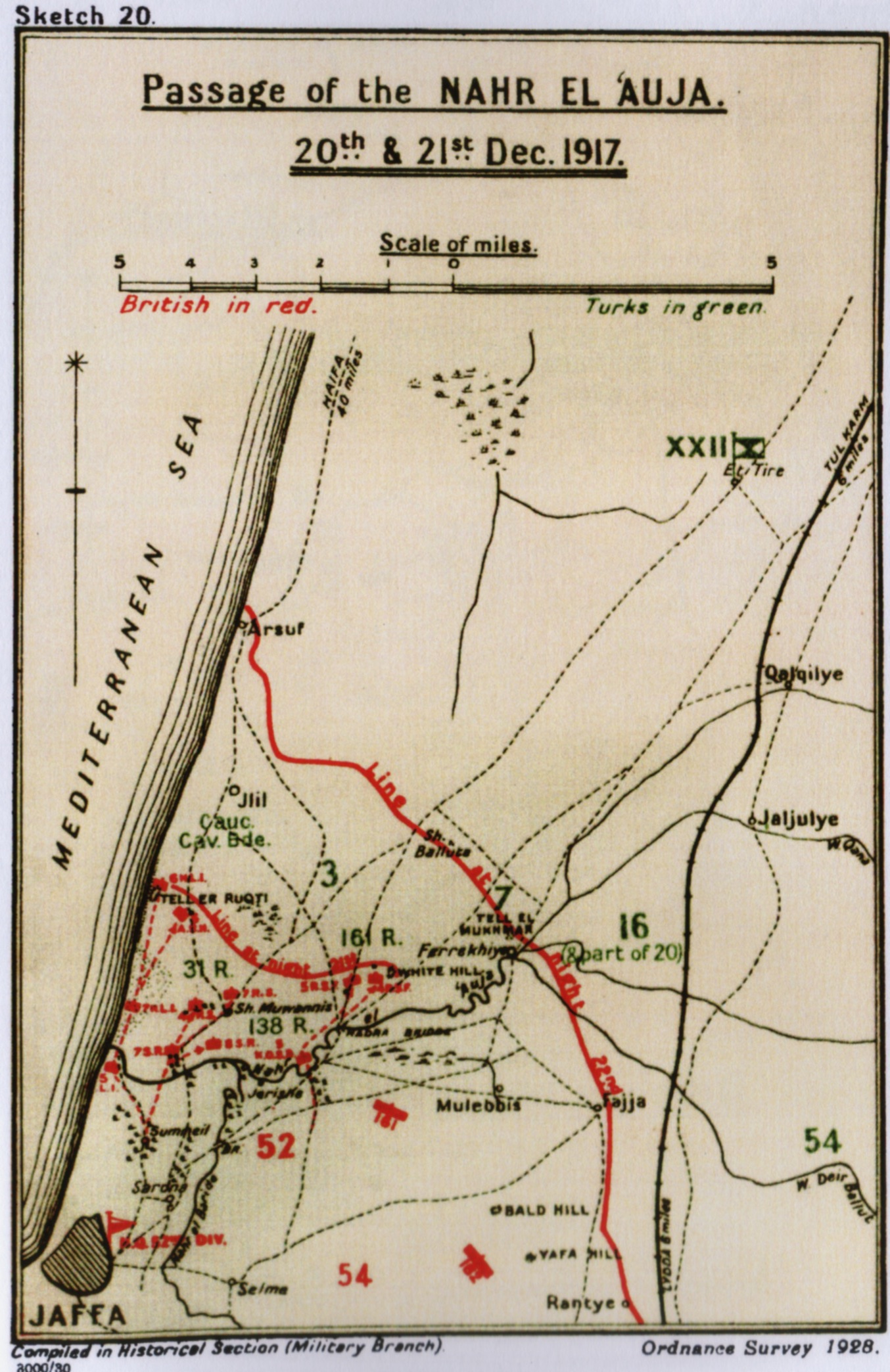
Passage of the Nahr el Auja

52nd (L) Division's next operation was the tricky passage of the Nahr el Auja to launch the Battle of Jaffa. The troops practised using canvas boats on a village pond, then at 22.30 on the evening of 20 December, in heavy rain, the first assaulting waves of 156th Bde went forward under cover of an artillery barrage and established a bridgehead. Bridging was made difficult by the flooded river, but the Royal Engineers got the following battalions across by raft. The 1/8th Scottish Rifles then turned eastwards and struggled through a muddy orange grove towards 'Keystone House', near which was the Turkish HQ. Bombing parties of the Scottish Rifles took both of these, which put them behind the Turkish trench lines. By 06.00 the battalion was digging in on a strong line, ready for any counter-attack, but none came: the Turks had been completely surprised, and were in full retreat. The advance was renewed up the coast on the morning of 22 December, with fire support from HMS Grafton and gunboats. 156th Brigade advancing in the centre came under shellfire, but casualties were few. Before nightfall, 52nd (L) Division reached the castle of Arsuf overlooking the Plain of Sharon, where it halted. The Official History describes the passage of the Auja as 'one of the most remarkable feats of the Palestine Campaign'. 8th Scottish Rifles suffered only 8 casualties.

==== Western Front ====
In the early part of 1918 the 52nd (L) Division remained in the lines near Arsuf. Then on 24 March it was warned for a transfer to the British Expeditionary Force (BEF) on the Western Front. The division's units sailed from Alexandria between 4 and 11 April, and the 1/8th Bn landed at Marseille on 17 April. The division was concentrated near Abbeville on 23 April. On 29 April it moved to Aire and continued training. On 6 May it moved to the Vimy area and took over front line trenches.

On 28 June 1918, 8th Scottish Rifles under the command of Lt-Col J.M. Findlay, DSO, transferred to 103rd Bde in 34th Division, a 'Kitchener's Army' formation that had been virtually destroyed during the German spring offensive earlier in the year and was being reconstituted. The original 103rd Bde had been composed of Tyneside Irish battalions; the new brigade consisted of the three battalions released when 52nd (L) Division was converted to the nine-battalion establishment standard on the Western Front, and retained their Lowland Scots traditions.

As soon as this was complete, 34th Division was to be sent to reinforce the French sector of the front. When the Germans launched the last effort of their Spring Offensive on 15 July (the Second Battle of the Marne), the division was diverted and by the evening of 18 July was concentrated round Senlis. The infantry were then moved up by lorry and by 03.00 on 23 July had completed the relief of a French division in the front line near Soissons. The 34th Division immediately joined in the French counter-attack (the Battle of the Soissonnais and the Ourcq) on 23 July, though 103rd Bde was held in reserve. The attack failed. By 29 July the division had shifted position to attack again and capture Beugneux Ridge. At 04.49 on 1 August 103rd Bde on the right advanced behind a heavy barrage towards Beugneux village, with 8th Scottish Rifles in close support. Despite heavy casualties the battalion pushed on to the foot of the hill, and the capture of the ridge was completed the following day. After the battle, the division entrained to return to British Second Army.

34th Division spent August refitting and training in the Ypres Salient, then took part in seizing Mont Kemmel when the Germans were forced to relinquish it. For most of the next month 103rd Bde was training, then on 20 September it returned to the line where active patrols were pushing the Germans off the Messines Ridge. 34th Division attacked on the first day of the Fifth Battle of Ypres on 28 September. The attack consisted of pushing forward strong patrols protected by barrages. 103rd Brigade took the first objective by 08.30 but could not get further. A new barrage was ordered for 16.45, but in the meantime the infantry had used their Lewis guns to subdue the opposition and pushed forwards. Despite casualties from their own barrage, the infantry seized Wytschaete Ridge.

The division was then in reserve until the Battle of Courtrai. On 14 October, 103rd Brigade was given Geluwe as its objective, and while the village was masked by a heavy barrage of high explosive and smoke shells it was encircled, three companies of 8th Scottish Rifles on the right, with the fourth company 'mopping up' after the enveloping companies had moved on to take the second objective and a number pillboxes. By the end of the day the brigade was up to the River Lys. Z Company of the Scottish Rifles crossed that night by an improvised bridge, but could make no progress and was pinned down for the whole of the next day. After suffering heavy casualties it was pulled back in the evening, just before a shell destroyed the bridge.

The river was crossed elsewhere, and the advance was resumed on 19 October. The battalion's last action was the Battle of Tieghem on 31 October. 34th Division attacked alongside the French VII Corps, and an international liaison detachment was formed to link between the two, formed by a half company of 8th Scottish Rifles and a company of the French 164th Regiment. The rest of 103 Bde attacked at 05.25 on 31 October behind a creeping barrage, supported by 10 French tanks. The first objective was reached by 06.45, and after a scheduled two hour pause, the brigade continued behind the barrage to complete the capture of Anseghem by 11.00. However, for some time it lost touch with the French 41st Division, which had been held up north of Anseghem, and with the liaison detachment that was supposed to cover the open flank, so the tanks had to turn north to cover this gap on the left. W and Y Companies of 1/8th Scottish Rifles reached Anseghem, but were unable to envelop it as planned, so they slipped round it to the south, while X Company mopped up the village behind the French tanks. The 41st Division failed to renew its attack before darkness fell, but 103rd Bde pushed out patrols during the night and found that the enemy had evacuated the high ground in front. 8th Scottish Rifles was ordered to exploit the situation and by 01.30 on 1 November the battalion reported that Boshkant was clear and that its patrols were moving up the hills north and south of the village. An hour later it had occupied the hills and its patrols were still pushing on, so the artillery barrages scheduled for the morning attack were cancelled and 103rd Bde pursued the Germans as far as the Scheldt.

Afterwards, 34th Division was withdrawn into reserve and was engaged in refitting and training until the Armistice with Germany came into effect on 11 November. After spending a period on light training on the Dendre and then at Namur, key men such as miners were demobilised and sent home. On 17 January 1919 the division entrained for the Rhine and on 29 January took over the right sector of the Cologne bridgehead as part of the British Army of the Rhine, after which the rest of the wartime veterans were progressively demobilised. 1/8th Battalion was disembodied on 24 October 1919.

=== 2/8th Scottish Rifles ===
The 2nd Line battalion was formed in Glasgow in September 1914. The 2nd Line Lowland Divisional and Brigade HQs began to form in January 1915, but it was some time before the various formations and units were assembled from their depots. Training was held up both by the lack of modern arms and equipment, and by the need to supply reinforcement drafts to the 1st Line. By August, however, the division was substantially complete and stationed at Bridge of Allan with the 2nd Scottish Rifles Brigade at Cambusbarron, when they were officially numbered 65th (2nd Lowland) Division and 195th (2/1st Scottish Rifles) Brigade respectively. In November 1915 the 2/5th and 2/8th Scottish Rifles formed a combined '17th Battalion' in 65th Division, and when regimental designations were resumed in January 1916 the 2/8th Bn had been absorbed by the 2/5th.

=== 3/8th Scottish Rifles ===
A 3rd Line or reserve battalion was formed at Glasgow between November 1914 and March 1915. By November 1915 it was at Ripon in North Yorkshire. On 8 April 1916 it was redesignated 8th Reserve Bn, Scottish Rifles, and on 1 September 1916, when it was at Catterick Camp, it was absorbed into the 5th Reserve Bn of the regiment in the Lowland Reserve Brigade.

=== 11th Provisional Battalion ===
In 1915 the Home Service men of the 8th Scottish Rifles were combined with those of the 4th and 5th Bns Royal Scots Fusiliers into 11th Scottish Provisional Battalion, which joined the Scottish Provisional Brigade (later 1st Provisional Brigade) on 22 May. In April 1916 the 1st Provisional Bde moved from Scotland to Kent to take over coastal defence duties, with 11th Bn stationed at Walmer. The Military Service Act 1916 swept away the Home/Foreign service distinction, and all TF soldiers became liable for overseas service, if medically fit. The Provisional Brigades thus became anomalous, and at the end of 1916 the remaining battalions were formed into numbered battalions of their parent units. 11th Provisional Bn became 11th Bn Royal Scots Fusiliers on 1 January 1917

== Interwar ==
When the TF was reconstituted on 7 February 1920 the 8th Cameronians reformed at Glasgow but on 26 August 1921 the battalion merged with the 5th Cameronians, becoming 5th/8th Battalion The Cameronians (Scottish Rifles) in the reorganised Territorial Army (TA). Once again the battalion formed part of 156th (Scottish Rifles) Bde of 52nd (Lowland) Division.

90 cm 'Projector Anti-Aircraft', displayed at Fort Nelson, Hampshire

=== Anti-Aircraft conversion ===
During the 1930s the increasing need for anti-aircraft (AA) defence for Britain's cities was addressed by converting a number of TA infantry battalions into AA units. The 5th/8th Cameronians was one of the battalions selected, becoming a Royal Artillery searchlight (S/L) regiment in late 1938 while remaining affiliated with the Cameronians. At the same time, the TA was doubling in size following the Munich Crisis, so two regiments were formed on 1 November 1938:

- 5th Bn Cameronians (Scottish Rifles) (56th Searchlight Regiment)
  - 417–420 Searchlight Batteries
- 8th Bn Cameronians (Scottish Rifles) (57th Searchlight Regiment)
  - 421–424 Searchlight Batteries

(In the event, only seven batteries were formed, so 57th S/L Rgt in South Glasgow had HQ, 420, 421, 422 and 423 Btys.) The 8th Bn (as 57th S/L Rgt) once more had its own identity and history. Both regiments were in 3 AA Division covering Scotland.

== World War II ==
=== Mobilisation ===
In February 1939 Britain's AA defences came under the control of a new Anti-Aircraft Command. In June a partial mobilisation of TA units was begun in a process known as 'couverture', whereby each AA unit did a month's tour of duty in rotation to man selected AA and searchlight positions. On 24 August, ahead of the declaration of war, AA Command was fully mobilised at its war stations. 8th Cameronians (57th S/L Rgt) became part of 52nd Light Anti-Aircraft Brigade, which was formed in August 1939 with responsibility for all of 3 AA Division's S/L provision.

=== 57th (Cameronians) Searchlight Regiment ===
During the Phoney War period there were a number of attacks on the naval bases of Scotland before the Luftwaffe turned its attention to the campaigns in Norway and France and the Low Countries. In August 1940 the RA took over all the S/L regiments in AA Command, after which the regiment was designated 57th (8th Battalion, Cameronian Scottish Rifles) Searchlight Regiment, RA.

12 AA Divisional sign

Scotland largely escaped air attack during the Battle of Britain, but the Luftwaffe then shifted to night attacks on Britain's cities (The Blitz). At the height of the Blitz, a new 12 AA Division was formed in November 1940 to take over responsibility for western Scotland including Glasgow and the Clyde. 57th S/L Regiment transferred to 63 AA Bde which was responsible for S/L provision across the new division. At this time the S/L layout was changed to clusters of three lights to improve illumination, but this meant that the clusters had to be spaced 10,400 yards (9,500 m) apart. The cluster system was an attempt to improve the chances of picking up enemy bombers and keeping them illuminated for engagement by AA guns or Royal Air Force (RAF) Night fighters. Eventually, one light in each cluster was to be equipped with searchlight control (SLC) radar and act as 'master light', but the radar equipment was still in short supply.

Glasgow and Clydeside received heavy raids on the nights of 13 and 14 March 1941 (the Clydebank Blitz), and again on 7 April. The Luftwaffe returned to Clydeside on 5 and 6 May, before the Blitz petered out in mid-May.

The regiment supplied a cadre of experienced officers and men to 238th S/L Training Rgt at Buxton where it provided the basis for a new 544 S/L Bty formed on 12 December 1940. This battery later joined a newly forming 88th S/L Rgt. 57th S/L Regiment remained in 63 AA Bde and 12 AA Division for the rest of 1941. By 1942, AA Command had more than enough S/L units, but was still seriously short of light anti-aircraft (LAA) gun units and began a programme of converting S/L units (which also had the benefit of saving manpower). On 23 January the regiment was joined by 535 S/L Bty, which had been formed in 56th S/L Rgt, and by 275 men transferred from 86th S/L Rgt, both of which were converting to the LAA role.

During much of 1942 the five batteries of 57th S/L Rgt were the sole S/L provision in 63 AA Bde. In November, it transferred to the command of 42 AA Bde in eastern Scotland, then the following month to 57 AA Bde in North West England.

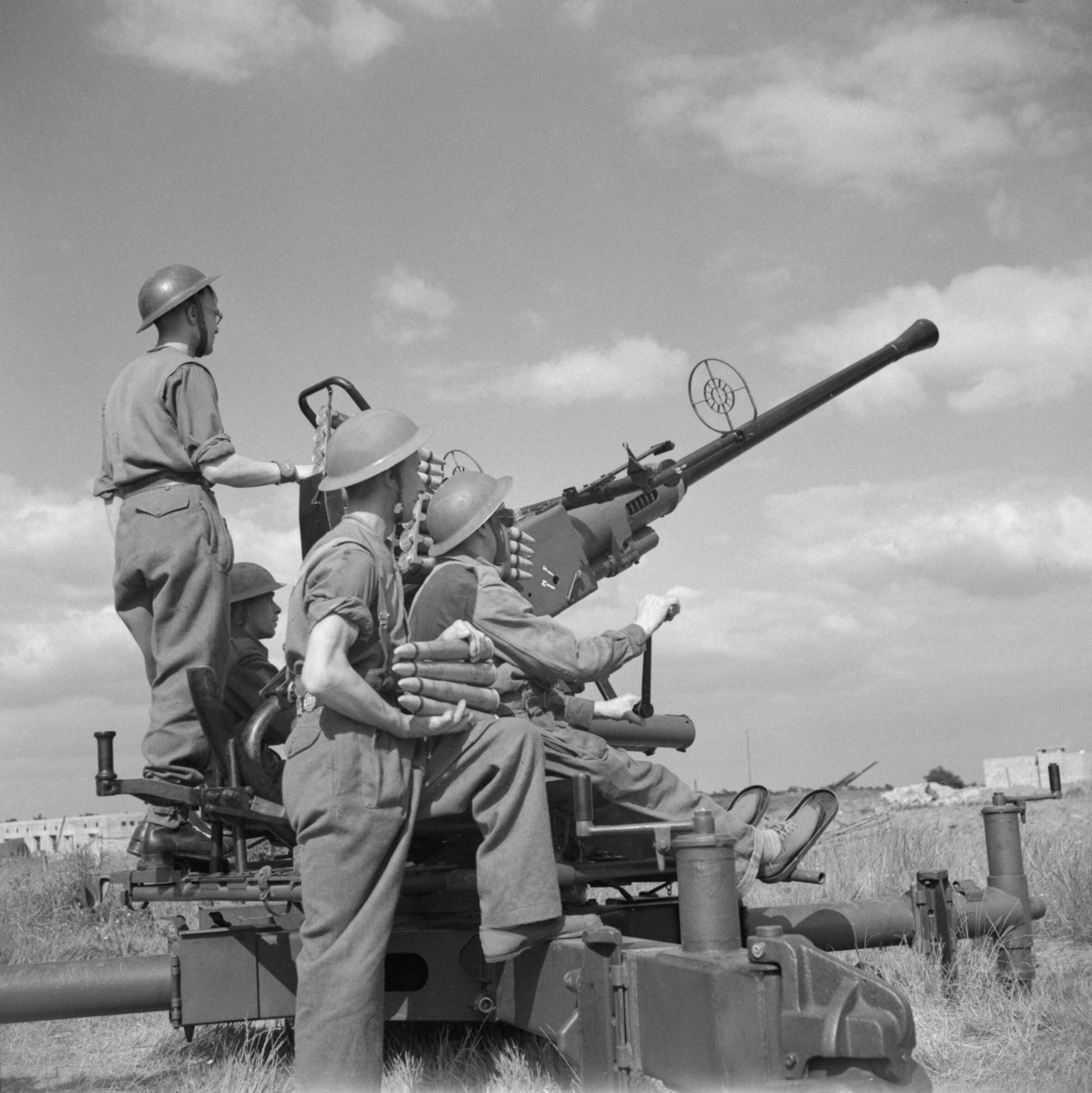
Bofors LAA gun and crew, summer 1944

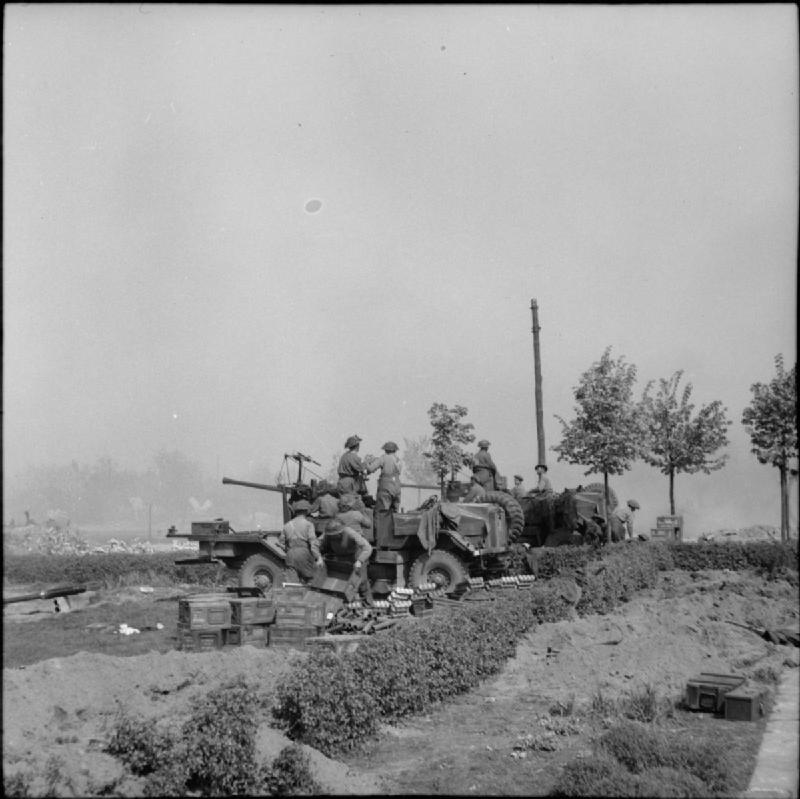
SP Bofors gun in action

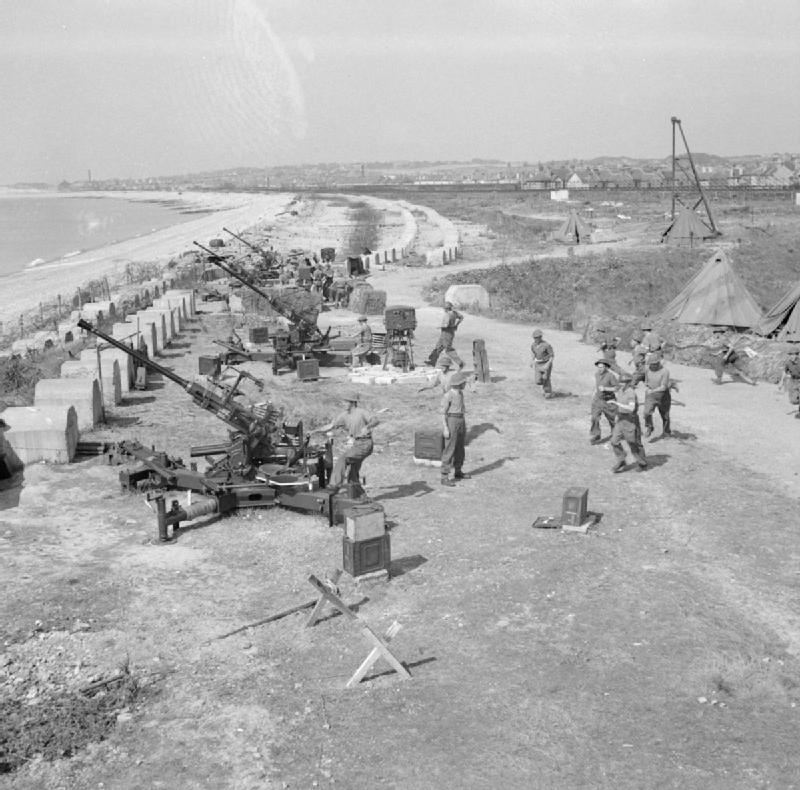
Bofors guns on the South Coast, 1944

=== 147th (Glasgow) Light Anti-Aircraft Regiment ===
By early 1943 it was 57th S/L Rgt's turn to be converted to the LAA role, becoming 147th (Glasgow) LAA Rgt on 20 February. In the process, 420, 421 and 422 S/L Btys became independent (see below), while the regiment was joined by 359 and 516 S/L Btys from 40th (Sherwood Foresters) and 59th (Warwickshire) S/L Rgts respectively. 423 and 516 S/L Batteries became 492 and 493 LAA Btys on 6 March, receiving their training at Ballykinlar Camp in Northern Ireland. The conversion was completed on 6 April when 359 S/L Bty became 495 LAA Bty and 535 S/L Bty left to become independent. By June the regiment had been joined by 496 LAA Bty, formerly 496 S/L Bty of 77th S/L Rgt.

The new regiment returned to mainland Britain via Stranraer in May and assembled for battle training at Penybont Camp in Radnorshire followed by mobile training under 11 AA Bde at Leigh-on-Sea in Essex. Although now part of the field army under Home Forces, the regiment was lent to AA Command, being assigned to 49 AA Bde in 1 AA Group in the London area. From 18 August it was deployed with RHQ at Chingford, 492 LAA Bty at Enfield Lock and 495 LAA Bty at Waltham Abbey (these batteries being responsible for the defence of the Vulnerable Points (VPs) of King George V Reservoir, Enfield Rolling Mills, the Royal Small Arms Factory and the Waltham Abbey Royal Gunpowder Mills). 493 LAA Bty was based at Hemel Hempstead with deployments to aircraft factories at Hatfield (De Havilland), Radlett (Handley Page) and Hayes (Fairey). A Troop of 492 LAA Bty was detached to Kingston-upon-Thames (Hawker). Because of confusion between Home Forces and AA Command, the regiment had no transport for some time.

On 18 October Home Forces ordered the regiment to Piddlehinton Camp in Dorset to join 47th (London) Infantry Division, a reserve formation on a low establishment in the Hampshire and Dorset District. 47th Division immediately sent it to East and West Wittering, near Chichester. The regiment was equipped with self-propelled (SP) Bofors 40 mm LAA guns and was active in mobile training around Chichester and on the Isle of Wight. During 1944, 47th Division was frequently switched between Southern Command and Northern Command, until it was broken up in August 1944.

147th LAA Regiment returned to AA Command and was deployed on the Sussex coast as part of Operation Diver, defending against attacks by V-1 flying bombs (codenamed 'Divers'). By the end of the year the regiment was distributed with RHQ at St Leonards-on-Sea, 492 LAA Bty at Bexhill-on-Sea, 493 LAA Bty at Eastbourne and 495 LAA Bty at Rye. By the end of the year the Diver threat to SE England had passed, and 21st Army Group fighting in North West Europe had a severe manpower shortage, so large drafts of men left 147th LAA Rgt to be retrained as infantry.

At the end of January 1945 the regiment transferred to 30 AA Bde in 5 AA Group in North East England. It took over responsibility for VPs from North Shields to Billingham, which were threatened by V-1s launched by aircraft over the North Sea. RHQ was established at Fencehouses, while 495 LAA Bty was detached to Patrington under 65 AA Bde.

=== Independent batteries ===
420, 421 and 422 Searchlight Btys became independent on 20 February 1943, followed by 535 S/L Bty on 6 April.

==== 1 to 6 LAA/SL Batteries ====
420 and 421 Batteries were converted on 7 May 1943 to provide parts of 1 to 6 LAA/SL Composite Btys, which were being formed for 21st Army Group. Their intended role was to defend targets such as airfields and harbours against low-level air attack. They began deploying to Normandy shortly after D Day (6 June 1944), with 6 LAA/SL Bty being deployed at Maupertus-sur-Mer Airfield in the US sector. In early September, after the breakout from the Normandy beachhead, 6 LAA/SL Bty remained under 75 AA Bde guarding the Caen Canal and River Orne crossings, 1, 3 and 4 LAA/SL Btys had moved up with 80 AA Bde to defend the River Seine crossings, 5 LAA/SL Bty was in 107 AA Bde defending the River Somme crossings under First Canadian Army, and 2 LAA/SL Bty was in 106 AA Bde advancing with XII Corps from the Somme to Antwerp. As 21st Army Group advanced, the LAA/SL batteries were progressively deployed to the liberated ports of Le Havre (1 Bty), Dieppe (3 Bty), Calais (6 Bty), Ostend (4 Bty), and Dunkirk (1 Bty, then 2, 3 and 4 Btys). After Operation Market Garden, 2 LAA/SL Bty was deployed to defend the bridges at Nijmegen against the threat of torpedo boats on the River Waal. During the winter fighting, including the operations in the Reichswald (Operation Veritable), 2 LAA/SL Bty was part of 100 AA Bde with VIII Corps, 4 LAA/SL Bty in 74 AA Bde with II Canadian Corps, and 5 LAA/SL Bty in 106 AA Bde with XXX Corps. In March 1945, 2 LAA/SL Bty helped to protect the supply dumps and assembly areas for the Rhine crossing (Operation Plunder), and was then deployed to guard the Royal Engineers' bridging site at Xanten. While the crossing was under way on the night of 23/24 March, 6 LAA/SL Bty was able to illuminate and then shoot down a Junkers Ju 88 attacking the bridge at Goch in the rear area. Again, 2 LAA/SL Bty provided cover for the bridging of the Elbe in Operation Enterprise (29 April), the last major operation of the campaign in North West Europe.

==== 422 and 535 S/L Batteries ====
422 and 535 Independent S/L Btys went to the Mediterranean Theatre, landing in Sicily after the Allied landings (Operation Husky). By September 1943, when Eighth Army launched its invasion of mainland Italy (Operation Baytown), 422 and 535 S/L Btys were defending its bases at Syracuse and Catania respectively. 422 S/L Battery disembarked at Bari in late December as part of 25 AA Bde. The port had suffered a disastrous air raid on 2 December, and 25 AA Bde was sent to take over and strengthen the AA defences of the vital base area. While US and Italian searchlights covered Bari itself, 422 Bty deployed 24 lights at nearby Barletta. By late 1944, 535 S/L Bty had followed the fighting as far as the port of Livorno, which it defended through the final winter of the war. There is an unconfirmed report that 422 S/L Bty provided 'artificial moonlight' for night operations by I Canadian Corps. 422 Independent Searchlight Battery was disbanded on 24 August 1945, and 535 Battery on 15 April 1946.

== Postwar ==
After VE Day the regiment was concentrated in the Birmingham area under 41 AA Bde. While demobilisation got under way, the regiment lent large numbers of men for summer agricultural work around Redditch and Malvern, moving to farms round Middlesbrough and Stockton-on-Tees in the autumn when it returned to 30 AA Bde.

When the TA was reformed on 1 January 1947, RHQ, 492, 493, 495 LAA Btys were placed in suspended animation at Sedgefield, County Durham, and the personnel formed a new regiment and batteries with the same numbers. This Regular Army regiment was then redesignated 116th LAA Rgt on 1 April 1947, with 351, 352 and 353 LAA Btys. However, this was cancelled on 1 May the same year and the regiment disbanded

Meanwhile, the TA unit reformed at Glasgow on 1 January 1947 as 592nd (Glasgow) LAA Rgt, forming part of 77 AA Bde (the wartime 51 LAA Bde). On 12 May 1950 it was merged into 474th (City of Glasgow) Heavy AA Rgt and the 8th Cameronians lineage ended. However, 474th HAA Rgt was later merged into 445th (Cameronians) LAA Rgt, descended from 5th Bn Cameronians.

== Uniform and Insignia ==
The various RVCs that were raised in 1859–60 had variations on Volunteer grey or green uniforms and different headgear. However, in 1863 a uniform of scarlet tunics with green facings, Trews of Black Watch tartan and blue shakoes was adopted for A–F Companies. Until 1868 The Highland Companies had scarlet doublets with green facings, Black Watch tartan kilts, and blue Glengarry bonnets with Blackcock's tail plumes. Blue trousers replaced trews in 1876, and dark blue helmets replaced shakoes in 1878. After the Boer War the battalion adopted a drab service dress with scarlet piping on the trousers and a brown felt hat turned up on the left side with the Scottish Rifles badge and a black plume (only officers wore the Scottish Rifles uniform in full dress and mess dress). This service dress was retained until 1908 when the battalion adopted the Rifle green uniform with dark green facings of the Scottish Rifles.

== Honorary Colonels ==
The following served as Honorary Colonel of the battalion:

- John Tennant, appointed 15 April 1863
- Sir Charles Tennant, 1st Baronet, appointed 22 December 1880
- Sir John Muir, 1st Baronet, Lord Provost of Glasgow, appointed 14 November 1891
- Warden R. Maxwell, VD, former CO, appointed 27 February 1904 (continued as Hon Col of 5th/8th Bn after World War I)
- Sir Steven Bilsland, 2nd Baronet, MC, (former captain in 8th Bn) appointed 1 November 1938

== Memorials ==
The Cameronians War Memorial, commemorating all the regiment's battalions in World War I, sculpted by Philip Lindsey Clark, stands in Kelvingrove Park, Glasgow. There is also a plaque to all the Cameronian dead in World War I in Glasgow Cathedral.

== External sources ==
- Mark Conrad, The British Army, 1914 (archive site)
- British Army units from 1945 on
- Imperial War Museum, War Memorials Register
- Great War Forum
- The Long, Long Trail
- Orders of Battle at Patriot Files
- The Regimental Warpath 1914–1918 (archive site)
- Land Forces of Britain, the Empire and Commonwealth – Regiments.org (archive site)
- Graham Watson, The Territorial Army 1947
