= 65th (2nd Lowland) Division =

- Active: 1914–1918
- Country: United Kingdom
- Branch: British Army
- Type: Infantry
- Service: First World War

Commanders
- Notable commanders: Theodore Stephenson (1916); George Forestier-Walker (1916); Edward James Montagu-Stuart-Wortley (1917–18)

The 65th (2nd Lowland) Division of the British Army was a second-line Territorial Force division, formed in 1914, which served on home defence duties during the First World War.

The division was formed as a duplicate of the 52nd (Lowland) Division in 1914, composed primarily of soldiers from central and southern Scotland, around half of whom came from Glasgow. It remained on home defence and training duties in Scotland and England until early 1917, when it was deployed to Ireland in order to free up another division for front-line service. It was disbanded in Ireland in early 1918, having not seen overseas service.

== History ==
The division was created as the "2nd Lowland Division", a second-line formation of the Lowland Division at the end of August 1914. At this time, Territorial Force soldiers could not be deployed overseas without their consent and the Territorial units were accordingly split into a "first line", with men who had volunteered for overseas service, and a "second line", which was intended for home service only. The second line units also served to absorb the large number of new, untrained, recruits who had joined the Territorial Force following the outbreak of war.

As with the original Lowland Division, the 2nd Lowland was organised into three four-battalion infantry brigades. These were later numbered as the 194th, composed of the 2/4th and 2/5th Royal Scots Fusiliers and 2/4th and 2/5th King's Own Scottish Borderers; the 195th, composed of the 2/5th, 2/6th, 2/7th, and 2/8th Cameronians (Scottish Rifles); and the 196th, composed of the 2/5th, 2/6th, 2/7th, and 2/9th Highland Light Infantry. The 194th recruited from Ayrshire, Dumfries and Galloway, and the Borders; the 195th predominantly from Glasgow and Lanarkshire; and the 196th entirely from Glasgow. The division also raised second-line Territorial artillery, medical, signal and engineer units, almost all from southern and western Scotland, with one heavy artillery battery from Edinburgh.

Command of the division was given to the Conservative peer Lord Erroll, a retired cavalry officer, in April 1915. Through the next two years, the 2nd Lowland, numbered as the 65th Division in 1915, provided trained men for its parent unit as well as carrying out home defence duties. The division was grouped around the Stirling-Dunfermline area of central Scotland, where it would remain until 1916. In mid-1915 the strength of its infantry battalions was set at a minimum 600 men, with any more than this being transferred overseas; later that year, all the infantry battalions were renumbered and several were amalgamated, with four additional battalions of the Royal Scots joining from the Lothian coastal defences. The old unit numbering was reinstated in January 1916 but the amalgamations remained. During 1916, the division was commanded by Major-General Theodore Stephenson, who had previously served in a senior post during the Boer War, and from September onwards by George Forestier-Walker, who had commanded a division at the Battle of Loos.

In 1916 the division howitzer brigade was broken up and its heavy artillery battery sent to France; this was the only unit of the original division to see service overseas. In May of that year the division was transferred to Southern Army in south-east England, then in January 1917 relieved the 59th (2nd North Midland) Division in Ireland. Here, it was dispersed, with units of the division based throughout central Ireland from Dublin to Galway. At around the time the 65th arrived in Ireland, the command was given to Major-General Edward James Montagu-Stuart-Wortley, who had been controversially sacked by General Sir Douglas Haig after the 46th (North Midland) Division, under his command, had failed in its attack during the first day on the Somme.

A second wave of reorganisation took place whilst in Ireland, with the division absorbing three "graduated battalions"—training units based at the Curragh—and two of the original battalions disbanding. This was a precursor to larger changes and in January 1918 the division was ordered to disband. It effectively ceased to exist on 18 March, when the headquarters closed but some units remained active until May.

The division was not reformed during the Second World War and the numbers for the subsidiary brigades were also not reused.

== Order of battle ==
The order of battle was as follows (organisation details are taken from The British Army in the Great War unless otherwise noted):

=== Organisation, late 1914 ===
Organisation as formed in late 1914.

2nd South Scottish Brigade
- 2/4th Battalion, Royal Scots Fusiliers
- 2/5th Battalion, Royal Scots Fusiliers
- 2/4th Battalion, King's Own Scottish Borderers
- 2/5th Battalion, King's Own Scottish Borderers
2nd Scottish Rifles Brigade
- 2/5th Battalion, Cameronians (Scottish Rifles)
- 2/6th Battalion, Cameronians (Scottish Rifles)
- 2/7th Battalion, Cameronians (Scottish Rifles)
- 2/8th Battalion, Cameronians (Scottish Rifles)
2nd Highland Light Infantry Brigade
- 2/5th Battalion, Highland Light Infantry
- 2/6th Battalion, Highland Light Infantry
- 2/7th (Blythswood) Battalion, Highland Light Infantry
- 2/9th Battalion, Highland Light Infantry

Royal Engineers
- 3/1st Lowland Field Company
- 3/2nd Lowland Field Company
- 1/3rd Lowland Field Company
- 2nd Lowland Divisional Signal Company

Royal Army Medical Corps

- 2/1st Lowland Field Ambulance
- 2/2nd Lowland Field Ambulance
- 2/3rd Lowland Field Ambulance
- 2/1st Lowland Sanitary Section
Royal Artillery
- 2/I Lowland Brigade, RFA
- 2/II Lowland Brigade, RFA
- 2/III Lowland Brigade, RFA
- 2/IV Lowland (Howitzer) Brigade, RFA
- 2/1st Lowland (City of Edinburgh) Heavy Battery, RGA
- 65th Divisional Ammunition Column
Divisional troops
- 65th Divisional Train, Army Service Corps
  (537th, 538th, 539th and 540th Companies ASC)
- 2/1st Lowland Mobile Veterinary Section AVC
- 65th Divisional Ambulance Workshop

=== Organisation, early 1916 ===
Organisation from January 1916 onwards

194th (2nd South Scottish) Brigade
- 2/4th Battalion, Royal Scots Fusiliers
- 2/5th Battalion, King's Own Scottish Borderers
- 2/7th Battalion, Royal Scots
- 2/8th Battalion, Royal Scots
195th (2nd Scottish Rifles) Brigade
- 2/5th Battalion, Cameronians (Scottish Rifles)
- 2/6th Battalion, Cameronians (Scottish Rifles)
- 2/4th (Queen's Edinburgh Rifles) Battalion, Royal Scots
- 2/9th Battalion, Royal Scots
196th (2nd Highland Light Infantry) Brigade
- 2/5th Battalion, Highland Light Infantry
- 2/6th Battalion, Highland Light Infantry
- 2/7th Battalion, Highland Light Infantry
- 2/9th Battalion, Highland Light Infantry

Royal Engineers
- 414th (3/1st Lowland) Field Company
- 415th (3/2nd Lowland) Field Company
- 416th (1/3rd Lowland) Field Company
- 2nd Lowland Divisional Signal Company

Royal Army Medical Corps

- 313th (2/1st Lowland) Field Ambulance
- 314th (2/2nd Lowland) Field Ambulance
- 315th (2/3rd Lowland) Field Ambulance
- 2/1st Lowland Sanitary Section
Royal Artillery
- CCCXXV (2/I Lowland) Brigade, RFA
- CCCXXVI (2/II Lowland) Brigade, RFA
- CCCXXVII (2/III Lowland) Brigade, RFA
- CCCXXVIII (2/IV Lowland) (Howitzer) Brigade, RFA
  (Broken up in May 1916)
- 2/1st Lowland (City of Edinburgh) Heavy Battery, RGA
  (Sent to France in May 1916)
- 65th Divisional Ammunition Column
Divisional troops
- 65th Divisional Cyclist Company
- A Squadron, 2/1st Glasgow Yeomanry
- 65th Divisional Train, Army Service Corps
  (537th, 538th, 539th and 540th Companies ASC)
- 2/1st Lowland Mobile Veterinary Section AVC

=== Organisation, early 1918 ===
Organisation in early 1918, prior to disbandment

194th (2nd South Scottish) Brigade
- 2/4th Battalion, Royal Scots Fusiliers
- 2/5th Battalion, King's Own Scottish Borderers
- 2/7th Battalion, Royal Scots
- 51st (Graduated) Battalion, Cheshire Regiment
  (Formerly 213th Graduated Battalion)
195th (2nd Scottish Rifles) Brigade
- 2/5th Battalion, Cameronians (Scottish Rifles)
- 2/6th Battalion, Cameronians (Scottish Rifles)
- 2/4th Battalion, Royal Scots
- 2/9th Battalion, Royal Scots
- 51st (Graduated) Battalion, King's (Liverpool) Regiment
  (Formerly 217th Graduated Battalion)
196th (2nd Highland Light Infantry) Brigade
- 2/5th Battalion, Highland Light Infantry
- 2/6th Battalion, Highland Light Infantry
- 2/9th Battalion, Highland Light Infantry
- 52nd (Graduated) Battalion, Cheshire Regiment
  (Formerly 221st Graduated Battalion)

Royal Engineers
- 414th (3/1st Lowland) Field Company
- 415th (3/2nd Lowland) Field Company
- 416th (1/3rd Lowland) Field Company
- 2nd Lowland Divisional Signal Company

Royal Army Medical Corps

- 313th (2/1st Lowland) Field Ambulance
- 314th (2/2nd Lowland) Field Ambulance
- 315th (2/3rd Lowland) Field Ambulance
Royal Artillery
- CCCXXV (2/I Lowland) Brigade, RFA
- CCCXXVI (2/II Lowland) Brigade, RFA
- CCCXXVII (2/III Lowland) Brigade, RFA
- 65th Divisional Ammunition Column
Divisional troops
- 65th Divisional Cyclist Company
- 65th Divisional Train, Army Service Corps
  (537th, 538th, 539th and 540th Companies ASC)
- 2/1st Lowland Mobile Veterinary Section AVC

== General officer commanding ==
- Lord Erroll (April 1915)
- Theodore Stephenson (1916)
- George Forestier-Walker (September 1916)
- Edward James Montagu-Stuart-Wortley (1917–1918)

== See also ==
- List of British divisions in World War I
