= Southern Army (Home Forces) =

Southern Army was a home service formation of the British Army during the First World War, responsible for the defence of South-East England, including both sides of the Thames Estuary.

It was formed on 11 April 1916 under the command of Sir Arthur Paget, with headquarters at Brentwood, Essex. The Army was composed of 2nd Cyclist Division, 65th (2nd Lowland) Division, 66th (2nd East Lancashire) Division, 67th (2nd Home Counties) Division and six provisional brigades (1st, 2nd, 7th, 8th, 9th and 10th), with 1st Mounted Division attached for training purposes.

66th (2nd East Lancashire) Division was established around Colchester. Its training was disrupted by the need to provide large drafts of reinforcements to the British Expeditionary Force (BEF) on the Western Front. However, it finally received embarkation orders in February 1917 and left for France.

71st Division moved into Essex in early March 1917 and concentrated at Colchester where it came under command of Southern Army. It took over responsibility for the defence of the East Coast from Mersea Island to Walton-on-the-Naze.

Southern Army was disbanded on 16 February 1918.
