= 1st Ayrshire and Galloway Artillery Volunteers =

1st Ayrshire & Galloway Artillery Volunteers 2nd Lowland Brigade, RFA 79th (Lowland) Field Regiment, RA 279 (City of Glasgow & Ayrshire) Field Regiment, RA
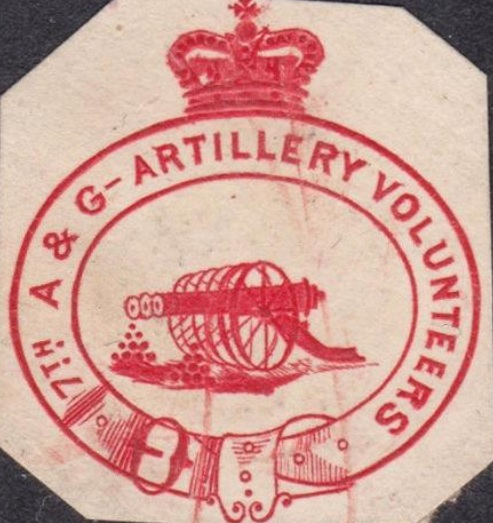
- Letterhead with crest of one of the Ayrshire and Galloway Artillery Volunteer Corps, c1895
- Active: 1860–1967
- Country: United Kingdom
- Branch: Territorial Army
- Type: Artillery Regiment
- Role: Garrison Artillery; Position Artillery; Field artillery
- Part of: 52nd (Lowland) Infantry Division
- Garrison/HQ: Irvine (1860–63, 1908–20); Ayr (from 1863); Kilmarnock (1889–1908); Troon (from 1961)
- Engagements: Palestine; North West Europe; Burma

The 1st Ayrshire and Galloway Artillery Volunteer Corps was formed in 1859 as a response to a French invasion threat. It was transferred to the Territorial Force (TF) in 1908 and its successor units fought with the 52nd (Lowland) Infantry Division in Palestine during World War I, and in North West Europe and Burma during World War II. It continued in the Territorial Army (TA) until amalgamation in 1967.

== Artillery Volunteers ==
The enthusiasm for the Volunteer movement following an invasion scare in 1859 saw the creation of many Rifle and Artillery Volunteer Corps composed of part-time soldiers eager to supplement the Regular British Army in time of need. The 1st Administrative Brigade of Ayrshire Artillery Volunteers was formed with its headquarters (HQ) at Irvine, North Ayrshire, in November 1860. It comprised the following Ayrshire Artillery Volunteer Corps (AVCs):

- 1st Corps formed at Irvine on 22 December 1859, as one and a half batteries; reduced to one battery in 1862.
- 2nd Corps formed at Ayr on 31 January 1860, as one and a half batteries; increased to two batteries in 1874.
- 3rd Corps formed at Largs on 1 March 1860, as one battery.
- 4th Corps formed at Ardrossan on 3 March 1860, as one battery.
- 5th Corps formed at Kilmarnock on 12 July 1860, as one battery; increased in 1864 to one and a half batteries.

In 1863, the following corps were added to the brigade:

- 1st Kirkcudbright Artillery Volunteers formed at Kirkcudbright on 2 February 1860, as one battery.
- 1st Wigtown Artillery Volunteers formed at Stranraer on 20 February 1860, as one battery.
- 2nd Wigtown Artillery Volunteers formed at Port Patrick on 22 February 1860, as one battery.
- 3rd Wigtown Artillery Volunteers formed at Sandhead on 4 May 1867 as one battery and became part of the brigade.

The first commanding officer (CO) of the administrative brigade was Major Sir Edward Hunt-Blair, 4th Baronet of Dunskey, Wigtown, appointed on 8 May 1861, who was replaced on 17 July 1863 by Lieutenant-Colonel the Hon Greville Vernon, whose his second-in-command (with the rank of major) was Captain (later Admiral) John Eglinton Montgomerie, Royal Navy. Hunter-Blair was reappointed (with the rank of lieutenant-colonel) on 4 September 1866.

In 1863, brigade HQ moved from Irvine to Ayr and, in May 1880, the brigade was consolidated as the 1st Ayrshire & Galloway Artillery Volunteers, with headquarters at Ayr and 11 batteries as follows:

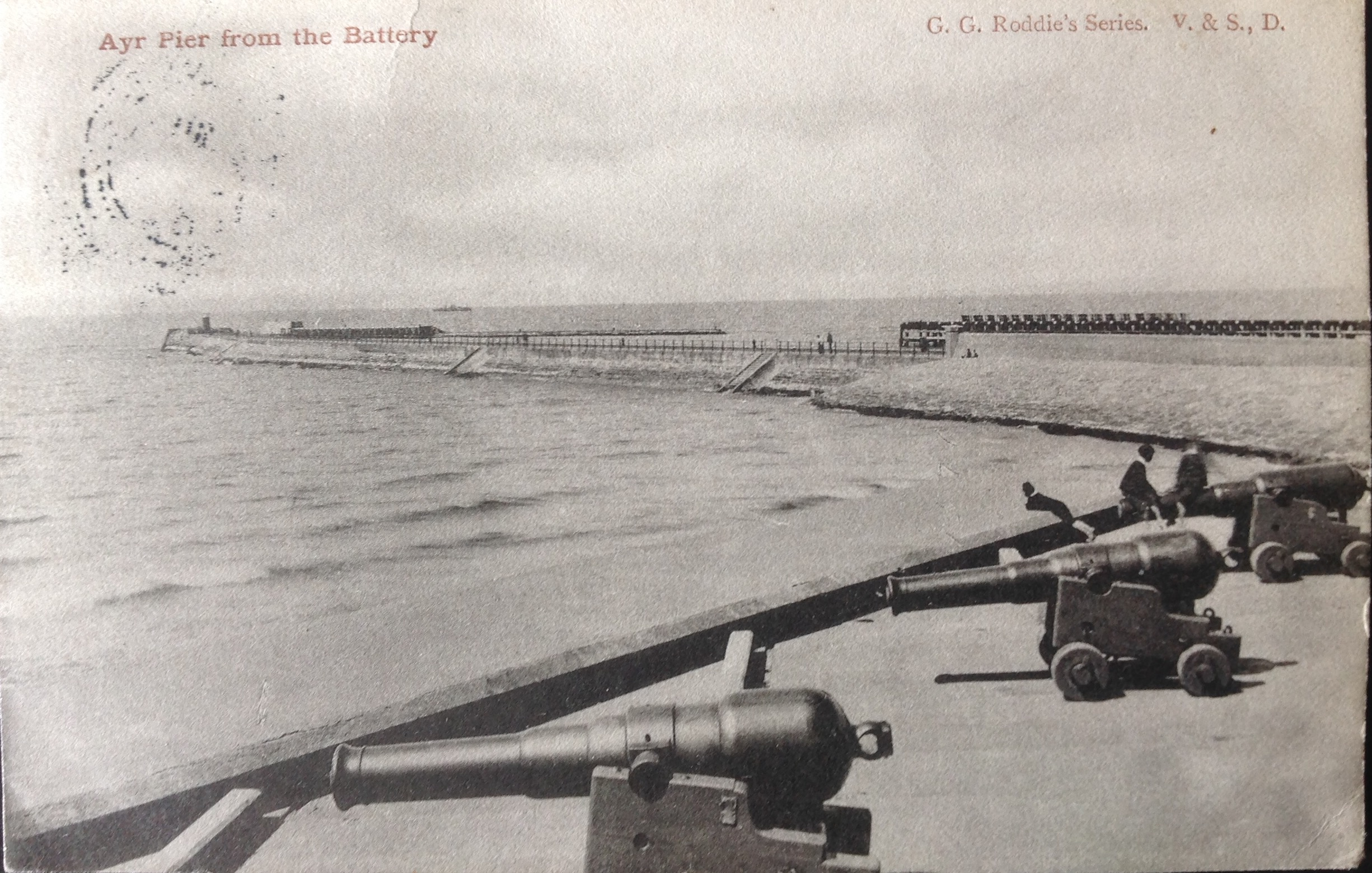
Old practice battery of 64 Pounder guns of the Ayr companies, pictured near the pier in 1907

- No 1 at Irvine (late 1st Ayrshire Corps)
- Nos 2 and 3 at Ayr (late 2nd Ayrshire Corps)
- No 4 at Largs (late 3rd Ayrshire Corps)
- No 5 at Ardrossan (late 4th Ayrshire Corps)
- Nos 6 and 7 at Kilmarnock (late 5th Ayrshire Corps)
- No 8 at Kirkcudbright (late 1st Kirkcudbright Corps)
- No 9 at Stranraer (late 1st Wigtown Corps)
- No 10 at Port Patrick (late 2nd Wigtown Corps)
- No 11 at Sandhead (late 3rd Wigtown Corps)

=== Position artillery ===
The AVCs were intended to serve as garrison artillery manning fixed defences, but a number of the early units manned semi-mobile 'position batteries' of smooth-bore field guns pulled by agricultural horses. At that time, they were not officially supported by the War Office (WO). The concept was revived in 1888 when some Volunteer batteries were reorganised as position artillery to work alongside the Volunteer infantry brigades. In 1889, a position battery of 16-pounder Rifled Muzzle Loading (RML) guns was issued to the 1st Ayrshire & Galloway and manned by the two Kilmarnock batteries. In that year, the HQ moved to Kilmarnock.

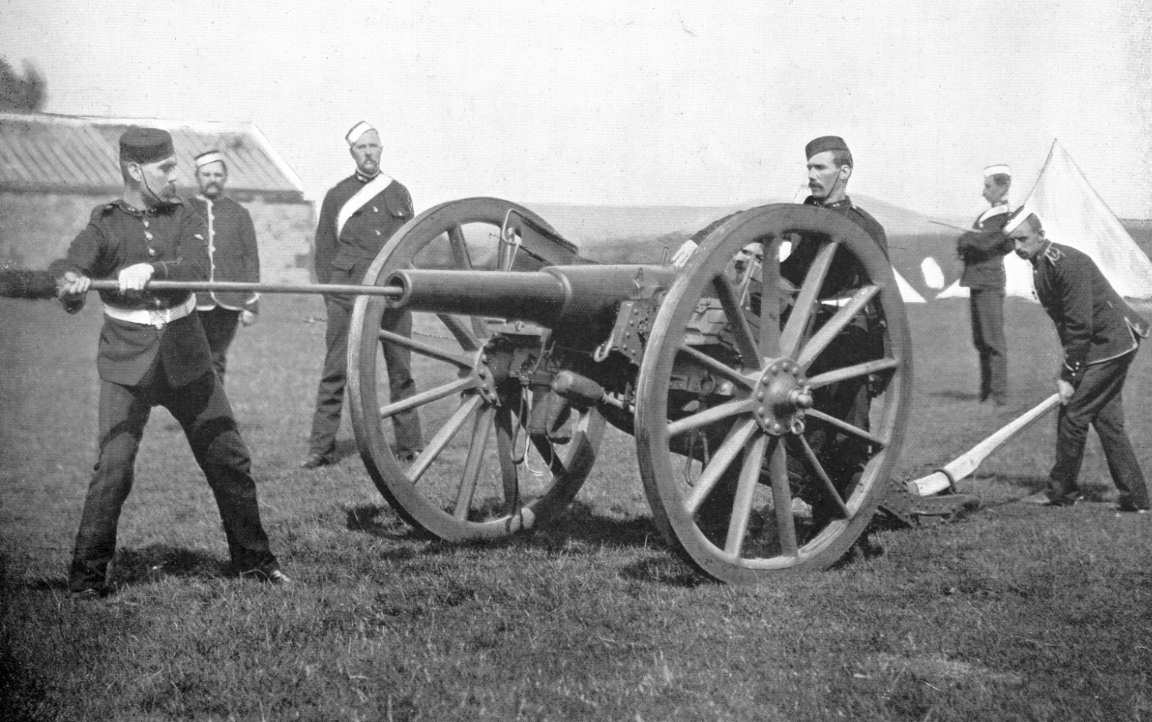
16-Pounder RML gun manned by Artillery Volunteers in 1897.

In 1892, the existing position battery took the number 1, absorbing the 6th and 7th Companies. In 1901, two more batteries of 9 Pounder Rifled Muzzle Loading (RML) guns were issued to the corps, which took the numbers 2 and 3 and absorbed the Irvine and Ayr Companies, and an extra personnel formed as a 6th Company at Kilmarnock. The 8th to 11th Companies took the numbers 7 to 10.

=== Royal Garrison Artillery ===
In 1882, all the AVCs were affiliated to one of the territorial garrison divisions of the Royal Artillery (RA) and the 1st Ayrshire & Galloway AVC became part of the Scottish Division. In 1889, the structure was altered, and the corps joined the Southern Division. In 1899, the RA was divided into separate field and garrison branches, and the artillery volunteers were all assigned to the Royal Garrison Artillery (RGA). When the divisional structure was abolished, their titles were changed, the unit becoming the 1st Ayrshire and Galloway Royal Garrison Artillery (Volunteers) on 1 January 1902, with its HQ at Kilmarnock. The following year the position batteries were redesignated as heavy batteries.

In 1903, 4.7-inch Quick Firing (QF) guns replaced the RML armament of all three heavy batteries. The final organisation of the unit until 1908 was as follows:

- No 1 Heavy Battery at Kilmarnock
- Nos 2 and 3 Heavy Batteries at Ayr
- Nos 4, 5, 7, 8, 9 and 10 Garrison Companies (No 6 vacant, accounted for by extra personnel in the heavy batteries)

The corps carried out its gun practice at Irvine. It used the Ayrshire Rifle Association range at Irvine for musketry, except the 7th to 10th Companies, which had ranges near their own headquarters.

In 1900, over 600 men of the unit volunteered to serve in the Second Boer War. However, as artillery men were not required, they were not accepted. Twenty-eight men served in South Africa during the war with other units.

== Territorial Force ==
When the Volunteers were subsumed into the new Territorial Force in 1908 under the Haldane Reforms, the 1st Ayrshire and Galloway RGA (V) was to have formed the III (or 3rd) Lowland Brigade in the Royal Field Artillery (RFA). The new unit would have had the following organisation:

- HQ
- Ayrshire Battery – from Nos 1,2 and 3 Heavy Btys
- Kirkcudbright Battery – from No 7 Company
- Wigtownshire Battery – from Nos 8–10 Companies
- 3rd Lowland Ammunition Column – from Nos 4–6 Companies

It also provided a nucleus for the Lowland Mounted Brigade Transport & Supply Column, Army Service Corps.

However, the Wigtownshire Battery was soon disbanded, the Ayrshire battery expanded to two on 12 September, and the brigade renumbered as II (2nd) by October 1908, giving the final organisation:

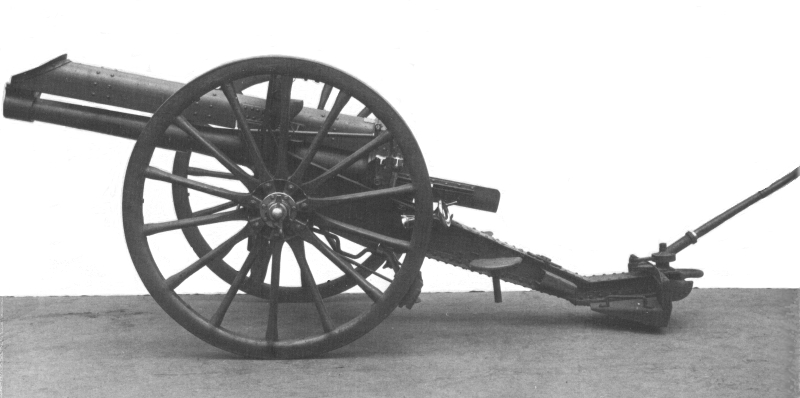
15-pounder gun issued to TF field artillery.

II Lowland Brigade, RFA

- HQ at Irvine
- 1st Ayrshire Battery at Irvine
- 2nd Ayrshire Battery at Titchfield Street, Kilmarnock
- Kirkcudbright Battery at Dee Walk, Kircudbright
- 2nd Lowland Ammunition Column at Ardrossan

The II Lowland Brigade was part of the TF's Lowland Division. The batteries were each issued with four 15-pounder guns.

== World War I ==
=== Mobilisation ===
The Lowland Division had been attending annual camp on the Ayrshire coast when the order to mobilise was received at 17.25 on Tuesday August 1914. Mobilisation began the following day at unit drill halls, and units undertook some guard duties until mobilisation was completed on 10 August, when the division went to its war stations as the mobile reserve in Scotland. II Lowland Bde was stationed at Larbert, near Stirling, with a battery detached to Invergordon to defend the naval base.

On the outbreak of war, units of the TF were invited to volunteer for Overseas Service. On 15 August the WO issued instructions to separate those men who had signed up for Home Service only, and form these into reserve units. Then, on 31 August, the formation of a reserve or 2nd Line unit was authorised for each 1st Line unit where 60 per cent or more of the men had volunteered for Overseas Service. The titles of these 2nd Line units would be the same as the original, but distinguished by a '2/' prefix. In this way, duplicate batteries, brigades and divisions were created, mirroring those TF formations being sent overseas.

=== 1/II Lowland Brigade ===
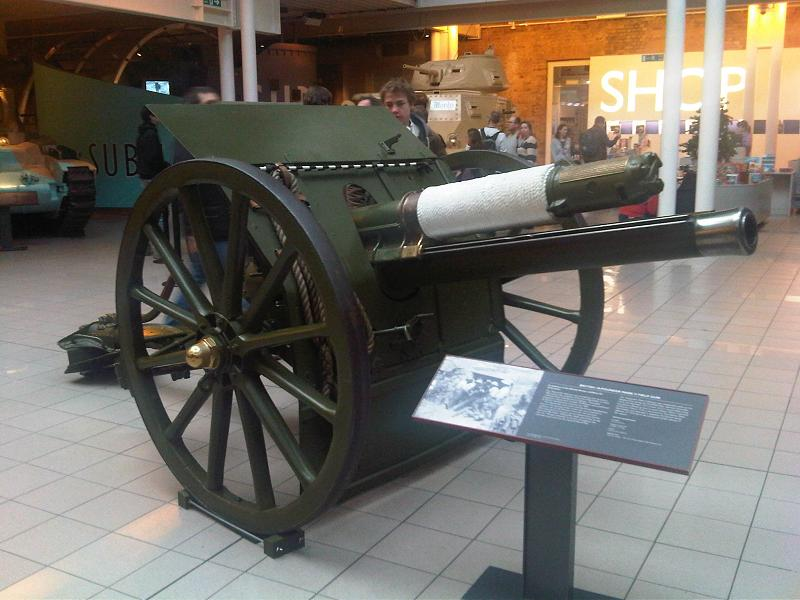
18-pounder field gun preserved at the Imperial War Museum.

==== Egypt ====
On 11 May 1915, the Lowland Division was numbered as 52nd (Lowland) Division, and later that month it began embarking for the Mediterranean, expecting to reinforce the Gallipoli Campaign. Only a portion of the artillery embarked, but 1/II Lowland Bde was one of those that accompanied the division. It travelled by rail to Devonport where on 2 June a section of 1/1st Ayrshire Bty sailed on the troopship Mercian with 1/IV Lowland Bde. The rest of the battery and the Brigade Ammunition Column (BAC) followed with the divisional cyclists and ambulances aboard the Karoa on 5 June, and the 1/2nd Ayrshire and 1/1st Kirkcudbright batteries with the small arms ammunition (SAA) sections of the rest of the BACs aboard the Marquette on 7 June. Although the first ships arrived off Gallipoli, only one infantry brigade landed and the rest were diverted to Egypt; the three ships carrying 1/I Lowland Bde went straight to Port Said, where they arrived on 17, 20 and 23 June respectively. The rest of the infantry did then sail to Gallipoli, but the only artillery sent was 1/IV Lowland Bde with its high-angle howitzers; apart from the SAA section of its BAC, 1/II Lowland Bde with its 15-pdrs never reached the peninsula, remaining at in Egypt during the whole campaign.

1/II Lowland Bde under Lt-Col Wilson was stationed at El Kubri, north of Suez, from 7 January 1916, but when 52nd (L) Division was evacuated back to Egypt following the failure of the Gallipoli campaign and the brigade rejoined it at El Qantara in March. The division took over part of No 3 Section of the Suez Canal defences. Two sections of the brigade (both sections of the Kirkcudbright battery were sent) were then detailed for duty on the Egypt's western frontier to defend against the Senussi. The old 15-pdrs and wagons were dragged for two days from the railhead at Sollum harnessed to camels. The following month the brigade was re-armed with modern 18-pounder guns. The guns were equipped with 'ped-rails', block of wood attached to the wheels to prevent them sinking into soft sand. The brigade was redesignated CCLX (or 260) Brigade, RFA, on 28 May 1916, and the batteries became A, B and C.

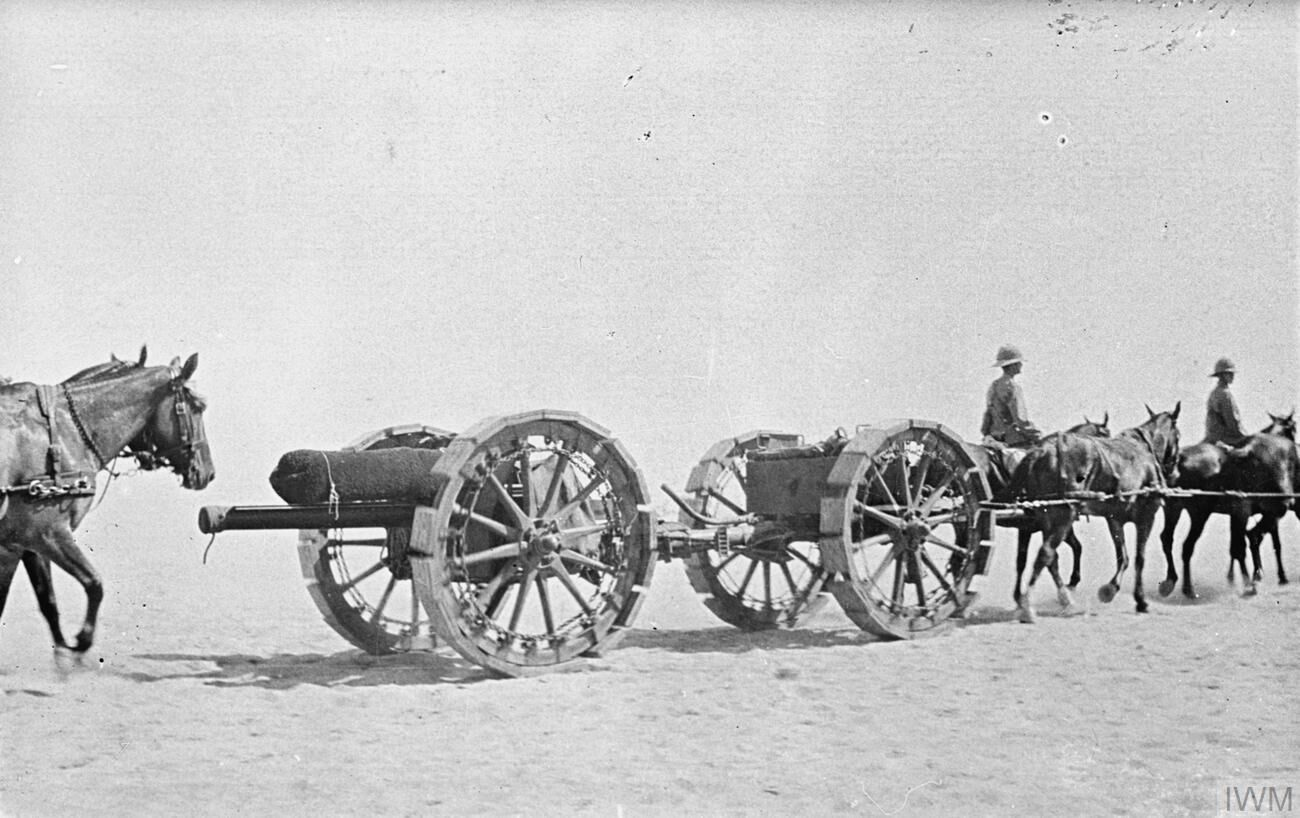
18-pounder with 'ped-rails' (sand wheels) in the Suez Canal area.

The infantry posts of the canal defences were some way east of the canal itself, but only a portion of the artillery was pushed forwards because of the shortage of water for the horses. However, CCLX Bde's two Ayrshire batteries were among those pushed out to Romani in July. When the Turks attacked on 4 August (the Battle of Romani), B Bty was in the railway loop in the centre of No 3 Section with the howitzer batteries, while A Bty was dug in on the Mediterranean shore near Mahamdiyah. The battle was fought before the Kircudbright battery could be brought back by rail, but the brigade's new commander, Lt-Col A. Brown (recently promoted from the Kirkcudbright battery), arrived in time and fought as a section commander in Maj J. Milligan's B Bty. The batteries had not previously had a chance to fire their new 18-pdrs, and ammunition was limited, but from 05.40 the forward observation officers on the ridge behind began to give them targets. A Battery on the left was observing for the fire of Royal Navy monitors offshore. As the Turkish attack moved round the British right flank, B Bty had to reposition its guns under enemy bullets, shells and aircraft bombs. When the Turks gathered behind 'Wellington Ridge' for an attack the battery fired Shrapnel shell over the reverse slope and when the attackers came over the ridge they suffered heavy casualties from the crossfire of the artillery batteries and machine gun and rifle fire from the redoubts. By mid-day the situation was well in hand and the artillery were able to conserve ammunition in the afternoon while the mounted troops began counter-attacking. Next morning the Turks left behind Wellington Ridge surrendered. The British artillery casualties had been very small.

After a short pursuit, the British remained in their positions for several months. CCLX Brigade was renumbered as CCLXI (261) Brigade on 15 September. (Note: The confusion was created because 1/I Lowland Bde, left behind when 52nd (L) Division sailed for Egypt, and now serving on the Western Front, had already been numbered CCLX (260th).) In September the Egyptian Expeditionary Force began preparing to mount an offensive into Palestine. For this advance, 52nd (L) Divisional Artillery was organised into two groups, each of two 18-pdr batteries and one of 4.5-inch howitzers; C Bty of CCLXI Bde was left behind on the lines of communication, and A Bty of CCLXIII (Howitzer) Bde joined the group. 52nd (L) Division formed part of the Desert Column covering the extension of the railway and water pipeline into the Sinai Desert, and the head of the column reached El Arish, near the Palestine frontier, on 22 December.

On 25 December 1916, the divisional artillery was reorganised once more. C Bty of CCLXI Bde was brought up from the rear and then broken up, Right Section joining A Bty and Left Section B Bty to bring both up to a strength of six guns. Then, on 30 December, A/CCLXIII Bty formally joined the brigade as C (Howitzer) Bty and, finally, on 1 January 1917, the BACs were abolished and incorporated into the Divisional Ammunition Column, giving the brigade the following organisation:

- A Bty (1st Ayrshire + R Sec Kirkcudbright) – 6 x 18-pdrs
- B Bty (2nd Ayrshire + L Sec Kirkcudbright) – 6 x 18-pdrs
- C (H) Bty (4th Glasgow) – 4 x 4.5-inch

==== Gaza ====
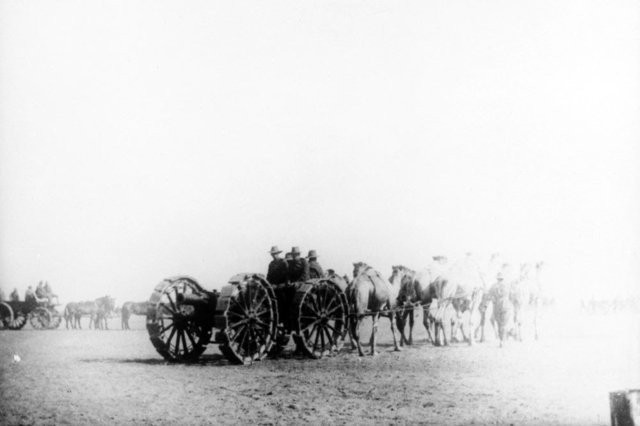
4.5-inch Howitzer with 'ped-rails', as used in crossing Sinai.

In March 1917, the EEF advanced against Gaza. 52nd (L) Division was in reserve and its Divisional Artillery was not engaged at the First Battle of Gaza (26–27 March), which failed to take the city. The division participated in a renewed attempt, the Second Battle of Gaza, beginning on 17 April, advancing without difficulty through the Turkish outposts to its objective, the El Sire Ridge. The EEF's artillery then spent 18 April bombarding the Turkish main position, before attacking the following day, when CCLXI Bde under Lt-Col G.S. Simpson (formerly of CCLXIII (H) Bde), supported 52nd (L) Division from behind Mansura and east of El Sire. The howitzers fired gas shells for 40 minutes beginning at 05.30, followed by 80 minutes of high explosive (HE). The 18-pounders joined in for the last 10 minutes before the infantry assault went in, laying down a barrage on the objectives and then providing a Creeping barrage for the advance. 52nd (L) Division attacked the key Ali Muntar position, but it was soon obvious that the gas shelling had not suppressed the Turkish artillery and machine gun positions, and shortage of ammunition meant that these were never silenced. The Turkish artillery searched the El Sire Ridge and the area behind: one of CCLXI Bde's observation posts (OPs) was knocked out by a direct hit. CCLXI Brigade supported 155th (South Scottish) Brigade's attacks, sweeping 'The Labyrinth', 'The Warren', Ali Muntar, and the long Turkish communication trench to 'Outpost Hill', but as early as 09.00 the brigade was ordered to conserve ammunition. At 11.00, the single tank on the division's front, 'War Baby', advanced under covering fire from the brigade and crushed the wire at Outpost Hill, allowing the infantry into the position, but it was then knocked out by Turkish artillery, and the Turks launched repeated counter-attacks. The rest of the attacks were held up, and Outpost Hill had to be abandoned after dark. The division's casualties had been very heavy, but the infantry dug in on the positions they had retained.

A period of trench warfare then set in, with occasional raids and frequent exchanges of artillery fire, in which 52nd (L) Divisional Artillery suffered numerous casualties in men and guns because of the superiority of enemy observation aircraft. Lieutenant-Col Simpson of CCLXI Bde was badly wounded by a sniper while visiting an OP, and was succeeded by Lt-Col J. Farquhar from CCLXII Bde. In case of wire-tapping, units were given codenames for use on the telephone: these were based on Scottish football teams, with CCLXI RFA assigned 'Celts' (as in Celtic F.C.).

The EEF was reorganised during the summer months and artillery ammunition supply improved. The offensive was renewed on 1 November 1917 with the Third Battle of Gaza. 52nd (L) Division was now in XXI Corps facing Gaza, where the preliminary bombardment began on 27 October. This was calculated to be the heaviest British bombardment of the war outside the Western Front. At 23.00, on 1 November, the bombardment opened on the outpost of Umbrella Hill and was successful in cutting the wire, neutralising enemy fire and cutting off enemy HQs: 10 minutes later 156th (Scottish Rifles) Brigade attacked close behind the barrage and quickly took the hill. After a renewed bombardment, 156th Bde attacked again at 03.00 on 2 November and took the front line trenches at El Arish Redoubt after a fierce fight. Just after 08.00, a large Turkish counter-attack began, and on which the whole of XXI Corps' artillery was turned and destroyed it. Having attracted attention to the Gaza front, the rest of the EEF broke through the Turkish lines further inland, beginning with the capture of Beersheba on 31 October. By 7 November, with the EEF's Desert Mounted Corps sweeping round into their rear, the Turks abandoned Gaza and 52nd (L) Division went in pursuit, capturing Wadi el Hesi the following day. Despite water shortages for the horses, B/CCLXI Bty (Note: According to the divisional history; the Official History says it was B/CCLXII Bty, but is frequently inaccurate in this respect.) was up with 157th (Highland Light Infantry) Brigade on 10 November when it pushed on to Ashdod and joined the Australian 1st Light Horse Brigade. The Turks were still holding the wells, but the battery shelled them while there was still light, and the infantry attacked at dusk. The Turks evacuated their positions before daylight and both men and horses could be watered.

The pursuit continued. The Turks held a position at El Mughar, which XXI Corps assaulted after a 60-minute bombardment on 13 November. CCLXI Brigade with a mountain battery accompanied 155th Brigade's advance on Beshshit and then fired an intense 15-minute bombardment of El Mughar at 15.30 to support the attack against the Mughar Ridge, which had also been charged by the Yeomanry of 6th Mounted Brigade. The important Junction Station fell to the British the day following the Battle of Mughar Ridge, while 52nd (L) Division's artillery made for Mansurah

On 19 November, the EEF moved east into the Judaean Hills to begin closing in on Jerusalem. XXI Corps was sent to capture the Nebi Samwill ridge. The village itself was captured by surprise on 21 November, but moving artillery on the hill roads was difficult: at Berfilya CCLXI Bde had to pull out of the column with many of its guns stuck in very bad ground and blocking the way for the infantry. The onset of heavy rain made the conditions worse but, by employing 10-horse teams, 52nd (L) Divisional Artillery got 10 guns (including a section of C(H)/CCLXI) up for 75th Division's attack on El Jib on 23 November, described by the corps commander as 'a magnificent feat'. Although too late to prevent that attack from failing, the sections were in position in a dip in the ground south-east of Biddu when the attack was renewed next day by 52nd (L) Division. Nevertheless, that attack also failed, and while Nebi Samwill itself had been successfully held, the wider attacks were called off and 52nd (L) Division went into reserve. The Turks threw in fierce counter-attacks, but when they had been beaten off Jerusalem fell without a fight on 9 December.

On 5 December, 52nd (L) Division had already marched out to take over the line north of Jaffa on the coast. After a tough march it was overlooking the River Auja by 8 December. The Turks were in a strong position on the other side. To drive them out, XXI Corps planned a 24-hour bombardment to launch the Battle of Jaffa, but 52nd (L) Division got infantry across the Auja during the night of 20/21 December, initially covered by the artillery's normal nightly fire, which then became a creeping barrage. The Royal Engineers then built bridges and the whole divisional artillery crossed during 22 December as the division advanced rapidly to Arsuf.

==== Megiddo ====
The division remained in the line near Arsuf until March 1918. The German spring offensive on the Western Front meant that urgent reinforcements were required, and 52nd (L) Division was sent. It was relieved in the line by 7th (Meerut) Division, but as part of the relief the whole of 52nd (L) Divisional Artillery was exchanged with 7th (Meerut) Divisional Artillery on 3 April 1918. The Lowland artillery served with this Indian Army formation in Palestine until the end of the war. (Note: Perry refers to 52nd (L) DA joining 7th (M) Division, but incorrectly lists CCLVI rather than CCLXI Bde.)

There was little activity in the coastal sector during the summer of 1918. On 28/29 May, the divisional artillery supported an advance of about 1.5 miles (2.4 km), then on 8 June 7 (Meerut) Division seized the 'Two Sisters' hills being used as OPs by the Turks: the attack was launched at 03.45 after a 15-minuted bombardment. It also caused heavy casualties to the Turks when the division raided 'Piffer Ridge' on 27 July.

The EEF was now ready to launch its final offensive in Palestine, the Battle of Megiddo on 19 September. For XXI Corps' opening attack (the Battle of Sharon) there was no preparatory 'softening up' bombardment: when the guns opened fire at 04.30 it was the signal for the infantry to advance with 35 minutes' moonlight followed by 35 minutes darkness before dawn. The field guns bombarded the enemy front line positions until the infantry arrived, then the 18-pdrs lifted to begin a creeping barrage while the 4.5s concentrated on important targets beyond the barrage. On 7th (Meerut) Division's front, the barrage advanced at a rate of 100 yards (91 m) per minute. Once it broke through the front line, its attack on the crossings of the Zerqiye marsh was supported by the heavy artillery while its divisional artillery moved up. The division drive the Turks off a rearguard position at 15.00, and opposition ended. The advanced troops bivouacked in Taiyibe that night. The advanced guard of the Desert Mounted Corps had already passed through the division to begin the exploitation phase. XXI Corps continued the pressure next day, with 7th (Meerut) Division advancing in two columns. 21st Indian Brigade was supported by a mixed field brigade including two of the howitzer batteries and one 18-pdr battery, but under the hot sun the artillery horses were unable to go on. After a rest and drink at midday, the infantry continued advancing and outpaced the artillery.

The cavalry were now fanning out across the Plain of Sharon and all XXI Corps had to do was follow up. 7th (Meerut) Division reached Haifa on 29 September and set off in three columns for Beirut on 3 October. A composite RFA brigade went with Column C, following the advance guard and the engineers and pioneers who widened the 'Ladder of Tyre' route for artillery. Column C marched 96 miles (154 km) in eight days. After a few days' rest, the advance continued, seeing few Turkish troops. The Lowland gunners reached Tripoli on 26 October, having marched 270 miles (430 km) in 38 days. Hostilities with Turkey ended with the Armistice of Mudros on 30 October.

The Lowland Artillery remained at Tripoli until 22 November, suffering a large number of deaths from disease. The brigades then began moving back to Egypt, reaching Cairo on 20 December. In March 1919, there were civil disturbances in Egypt, and the gunners formed several mobile columns for patrol work. They remained at Abbassia Barracks outside Cairo until August, when their demobilisation was completed. CCLXI Brigade, RFA, was then placed in suspended animation.

=== 2/II Lowland Brigade ===
2/II Lowland Brigade served with the 2nd Lowland Division (65th (2nd Lowland) Division from August 1915) in Scotland and England. It was redesignated CCCXXVI (or 326) Brigade, RFA, in May 1916. Early in 1917, the division was sent to Ireland. It was broken up in early 1918, but 326 Bde remained at Kildare until 27 October 1919 when it completed its disbandment.

== Interwar years ==
The 2nd Lowland Brigade re-formed in 1920, and was redesignated as the 79th (Lowland) Brigade, RFA, the following year when the TF was reconstituted as the Territorial Army (TA). It continued to be part of 52nd (Lowland) Division and had the following organisation:

- HQ at Drill Hall, 111 South Harbour Street, Ayr
- 313 (Ayr) Bty at Ayr
- 314 (Irvine) Bty at High Street, Irvine
- 315 (Kirkcudbright) Bty at Drill Hall, Kirkcudbright
- 316 (Kilmarnock) (Howitzer) Bty at John Finnie Street, Kilmarnock

Field Brigades were termed Field Regiments from 1938 onwards.

The establishment of a TA divisional artillery brigade was four 6-gun batteries, three equipped with 18-pounders and one with 4.5-inch howitzers, all of World War I patterns. However, the batteries only held four guns in peacetime. The guns and their first-line ammunition wagons were still horsedrawn and the battery staffs were mounted. Partial mechanisation was carried out from 1927, but the guns retained iron-tyred wheels until pneumatic tyres began to be introduced just before World War II. In 1924, the RFA was subsumed into the Royal Artillery (RA), and the word 'Field' was inserted into the titles of its brigades and batteries.

In 1938, the RA modernised its nomenclature and a lieutenant-colonel's command was designated a 'regiment' rather than a 'brigade'; this applied to TA field brigades from 1 November 1938.

== World War II ==
=== Mobilisation ===
The TA was doubled in size after the Munich Crisis, and most regiments split to form duplicates. Part of the reorganisation was that field regiments changed from four six-gun batteries to an establishment of two batteries, each of three four-gun troops. For the 79th (Lowland) Fd Rgt, this resulted in the following organisation from 12 June 1939:

79th (Lowland) Field Regiment, Royal Artillery

- HQ at Ayr
- 313 (Ayr) Field Bty
- 314 (Irvine) Field Bty

130th Field Regiment, Royal Artillery

- HQ at Kilmarnock
- 315 (Kirkcudbright) Field Bty
- 316 (Kilmarnock) Field Bty

=== 79th (Lowland) Field Regiment ===
79th Field Regiment mobilised in 52nd (Lowland) Infantry Division. Apart from a period in June 1940 when the rest of the division was briefly deployed to France, the regiment served with the 52nd (L) Division throughout the war. One of the lessons learned from the Battle of France was that the two-battery organisation did not work: field regiments were intended to support an infantry brigade of three battalions. As a result, they were reorganised into three 8-gun batteries. On 6 July, 79th (L) Fd Rgt reorganised as A, B and C Btys, but by March 1941 these had been numbered as 313, 314 and 457 Fd Btys.

The regiment served with 52nd (L) Division in the campaign in North West Europe from October 1944 to VE Day. It was placed in suspended animation on 10 May 1946 in British Army of the Rhine (BAOR).

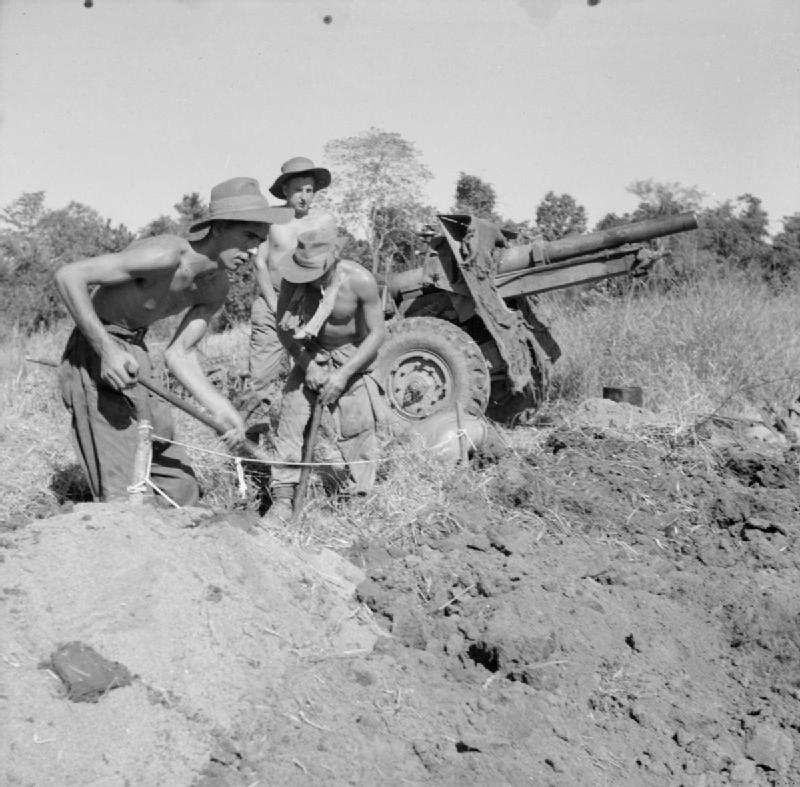
Gunners of 36th Division dig a pit for their 25-pounder gun by the Shweli River in Burma, February 1945.

=== 130th (Lowland) Field Regiment ===
130th Field Regiment mobilised in 15th (Scottish) Infantry Division (the duplicate of 52nd (Lowland)) and served with it through the early years of war. The regiment formed its third battery, 494 Fd Bty, by March 1941. It was authorised to use its parent's 'Lowland' subtitle on 17 February 1942. It left the 15th (S) Division on 4 January 1942 and sailed to India, where it joined first 14th Indian Infantry Division and later 36th Indian Division, with which it served in the Burma Campaign. 36th Indian Division became 36th British Division in September 1944 and continued fighting in Burma.

130th (Lowland) Fd Rgt passed into suspended animation on 30 September 1946.

== Postwar ==
When the TA was reconstituted on 1 January 1947, the 79th reformed at Ayr as 279 (Lowland) Field Rgt, while 130th reformed at Troon (later returning to Kilmarnock) as 330 (Lowland) Medium Rgt. Both were in 85 (Field) Army Group Royal Artillery.

The Lowland regiments were reorganised on 1 July 1950 when 279 (Lowland) Fd Rgt absorbed the Greenock-based 328 (Lowland) Medium Rgt (except one battery) and 330 (Lowland) Medium Rgt converted to the Light Anti-Aircraft (LAA) role. At the same time, 85 (Fd) AGRA became HQ 52nd (Lowland) Divisional Artillery once more. When Anti-Aircraft Command was abolished on 10 March 1955, 279 Fd Rgt and 330 LAA Rgt were amalgamated as 279 (Ayrshire) Fd Rgt.

With the ending of National Service, there was a reduction of the TA in 1961, and most of 279 (Ayrshire) Fd Rgt was amalgamated with 280 (Lowland – City of Glasgow) Medium Rgt to form 279th (City of Glasgow & Ayrshire) Fd Rgt with the following organisation:

- RHQ at Troon
- P (1st City of Glasgow) Bty
- Q (Ayrshire) Bty
- R (3rd City of Glasgow) Bty

Surplus personnel of 279 (Ayrshire) Fd Rgt were transferred to 576 (General Transport) Company, Royal Army Service Corps.

When the TA was reduced into the Territorial and Army Volunteer Reserve in 1967, the regiment was merged with 277 (Argyll and Sutherland Highlanders) Fd Rgt and 278 (Lowland) Fd Rgt to form 'S (Ayrshire)' and 'T (Glasgow)' Btys in the Glasgow-based Lowland Regiment, RA. The Lowland Regiment was reduced to a cadre in 1969 and disbanded in 1975, but in 1986 105 (Scottish) Air Defence Regiment was designated as its successor unit.

== Uniforms ==
The original uniform of the 1st and 2nd Ayrshire AVCs was blue tunics with red collars, cuffs, and piping, edged all round with black braid and with four rows of black braid across the chest. Blue trousers with black stripe with red piping were also worn, along with blue peaked caps with a black lace band, scarlet piping, and a silver grenade in front. Black waist-belts were worn. The original uniform of the 1st Wigtown was blue with scarlet facings, white belts, and silver badges.

== Commanding officers ==
The commanding officers of the unit included:

- Major Sir Edward Hunt-Blair, 4th Baronet, 8 May 1861
- Lt-Col Hon. Greville Vernon, 17 July 1863
- Lt-Col Sir Edward Hunter-Blair, Bart, (reappointed), 4 September 1866
- Vacant 1872–73
- Lt-Col John Shand, 6 May 1874
- Lt-Col Sir Mark John MacTaggart–Stewart, 1st Baronet of Southwick, VD, 5 February 1879
- Lt-Col (honorary Colonel) John G. Sturrock, VD, 22 December 1888
- Lt-Col T E Stuart, 5 April 1905
- Lt-Col C.H. Wilson, 9 May 1911
- Lt-Col A. Brown (Romani)
- Lt-Col G.S. Simpson (2nd Gaza)
- Lt-Col J. Farquhar (3rd Gaza)
- Lt-Col J. Milligan, DSO, TD
- Brevet Col A.R. Crawford, TD, 16 February 1925
- Lt-Col J. Kennedy
- Lt-Col T.T. Anderson, TD, 16 February 1938
- Lt-Col R.G. Price (130th in India/Burma)
- Lt-Col R.C. Laughton (130th in India/Burma)
- Lt-Col R.A.G. Nicholson (130th in India/Burma)
- Lt-Col J.S. Wilkins (130th in India/Burma)
- Lt-Col G.G. Peel (130th in India/Burma)
- Lt-Col J.D.C. Thompson (130th in India/Burma)
- Lt-Col D.C.B. MacQueen (130th in India/Burma)
- Lt-Col W. Hanwell (130th in India/Burma)

== Honorary Colonels ==
The following served as Honorary Colonel of the unit:

- Sir Mark John MacTaggart–Stewart, Bt, VD, former CO, appointed 22 December 1888
- Brig-Gen J.W. Walker, CMG, DSO, TD, appointed 21 February 1922

== Memorial ==
There is a brass memorial plaque in a marble surround in Troon Town Hall to the 14 men of B Battery, 261st Brigade, RFA, who died in World War I.
