= 1st Lanarkshire Artillery Volunteers =

1st Lanarkshire Artillery Volunteers 1st Lanarkshire RGA (V) 3rd Lowland Brigade, RFA 80th (Lowland – City of Glasgow) Field Regiment, RA 280th (City of Glasgow Artillery) Field Regiment, RA Lowland Regiment, RA
- Active: 30 December 1859–1 April 1975
- Country: United Kingdom
- Branch: Territorial Army
- Type: Artillery
- Role: Garrison Artillery; Position Artillery; Field Artillery
- Size: Up to 4 brigades/regiments
- Part of: 52nd (Lowland) Division
- Garrison/HQ: Glasgow
- Nicknames: 'The Glasgow Howitzers' (IV Brigade, RFA)
- Engagements: Gallipoli; Palestine; Normandy; North West Europe

The 1st Lanarkshire Artillery Volunteers were formed in 1859 as a response to a French invasion threat. Its units fought at Gallipoli and in Palestine during World War I, and in Normandy and North West Europe during World War II. It continued in the postwar Territorial Army until 1961.

== Artillery Volunteers 1859-1908 ==
The enthusiasm for the Volunteer movement following an invasion scare in 1859 saw the creation of many Rifle, Artillery and Engineer Volunteer Corps composed of part-time soldiers eager to supplement the Regular British Army in time of need. A number of Artillery Volunteer Corps (AVCs) were raised in Glasgow and its suburbs in Lanarkshire. The 1st Administrative Brigade Lanarkshire Artillery Volunteers was formed, with headquarters at Glasgow, on 6 March 1860, comprising the following AVCs of one battery each:

- 1st Corps accepted for service on 30 December 1859
- 2nd Corps accepted for service on 30 December 1859
- 3rd Corps accepted for service on 30 December 1859
- 4th Corps (1st Northern) accepted for service on 6 December 1859
- 5th Corps (2nd Northern) accepted for service on 27 December 1859
- 6th Corps (3rd Northern) accepted for service on 27 December 1859
- 7th Corps (1st Eastern, Gallowgate) accepted for service on 10 January 1860
- 8th Corps (Ironmongers) accepted for service on 10 January 1860
- 9th Corps (2nd Eastern) accepted for service on 30 January 1860
- 10th Corps (Calton Artisans) accepted for service on 16 February 1860
- 11th Corps (Maryhill Artisans) accepted for service on 5 March 1860
- 12th Corps (Western) accepted for service on 12 May 1860
- 13th Corps (Hillhead and Dowanhill) accepted for service on 24 July 1860
- 14th Corps accepted for service on 26 July 1860
- 15th Corps (Partick), accepted for service on 2 November 1860

The 4th, 5th, 6th, 10th, and 11th were artisan corps, the men of which paid 2s. 6d. entry money, and 30s. for their uniforms, the remaining expenses being met by outside subscriptions, and the first four being assisted from the Glasgow Central Fund. The 1st Corps was formed, it is said, at the suggestion of Prince Albert, made at the opening of the Loch Katrine waterworks on 14 October 1859, that Glasgow should form some artillery. Mr John Wilkie, a leading lawyer of the city, took the matter in hand, and so many members joined the corps that from the outset three batteries could be formed, which were numbered the 1st, 2nd, and 3rd. These were entirely self-supporting, the honorary members paying £5 each, on enrolment, to the funds, and the effective members subscribing 10s. each annually and buying their own uniform and belts at a cost of £4 a-head. The remaining corps were raised on similar principles. In 1862, the brigade was consolidated as the 1st Lanarkshire Artillery Volunteers of fifteen batteries, which retained their former numbers.

The 1st Lanarkshire had a number of different buildings in various Glasgow locations, including 260 St. Vincent Street in the 1870s, and 98 Sauchiehall Street in the 1890s. By the early 20th Century the unit possessed an orderly-room, officers' and serjeants' club, and headquarters (HQ) at 8 Newton Terrace, Sauchiehall Street. The corps had five separate drill halls in different parts of the city, each with harness rooms, gun-sheds etc. for two batteries. The Maryhill drill hall accommodated all the ammunition waggons when not in use in the batteries. For over 30 years, the corps carried out its annual practice at Irvine, from Bogside Camp, and as a rifle-range it used that at Darnley belonging to the 1st and 3rd Lanark Volunteer Rifle Corps.

=== Royal Garrison Artillery ===
In 1882 all the AVCs were affiliated to one of the territorial garrison divisions of the Royal Artillery (RA) and the 1st Lanarkshire AVC became part of the Scottish Division. In 1889 the structure was altered, and the corps joined the Southern Division. In 1899 the RA was divided into separate field and garrison branches, and the artillery volunteers were all assigned to the Royal Garrison Artillery (RGA). When the divisional structure was abolished their titles were changed, the unit becoming the 1st Lanarkshire Royal Garrison Artillery (Volunteers) on 1 January 1902.

In 1900, the whole corps volunteered its services for South Africa. This was not accepted, as Artillery units weren't required. However, 62 members of the corps, including Lieut. J. C. Clark, served in various capacities in South Africa during the war.

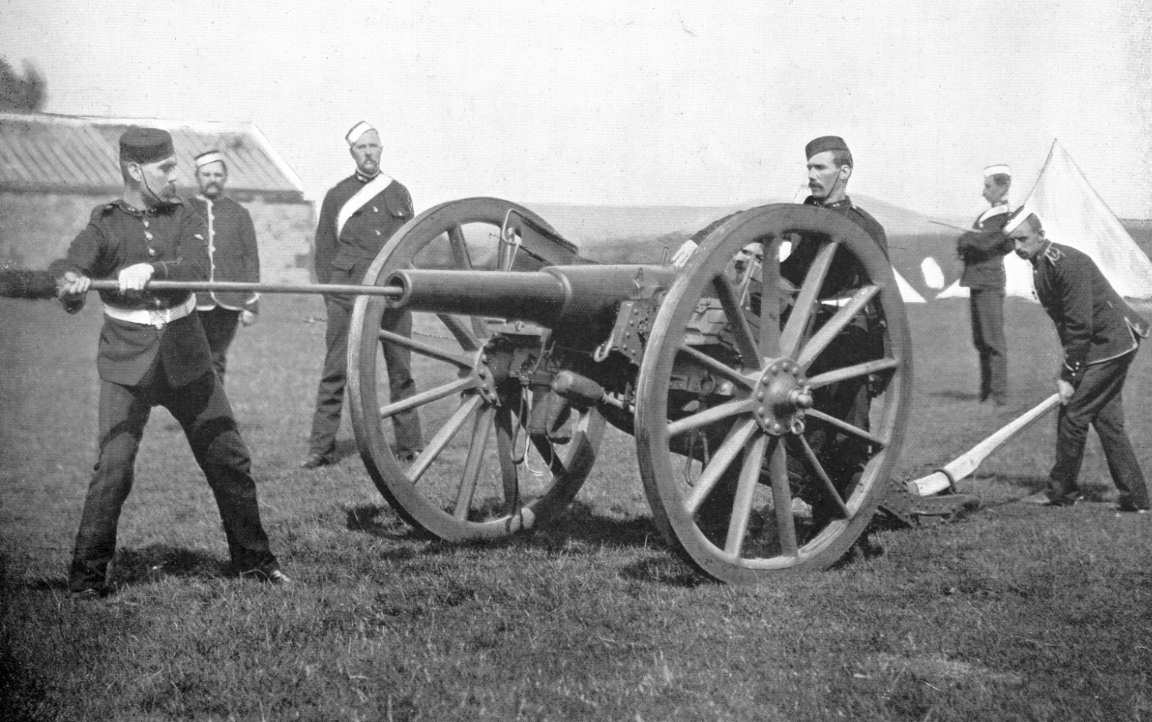
16-Pounder RML gun manned by Artillery Volunteers.

=== Position artillery ===
The AVCs were intended to serve as garrison artillery manning fixed defences, but a number of the early units manned semi-mobile 'position batteries' of smooth-bore field guns pulled by agricultural horses. Up to 1865, the only guns on which the Lanarkshire batteries were drilled were 32-pounder smoothbores, but on 13 December of that year, a sixteenth battery was raised and equipped as a field battery with four 6-pounder smoothbore field-guns. (The 17th Battery was formed as a garrison company in 1868.) At that time the position batteries were not officially supported by the War Office (WO). In 1876, the 1st Corps won the Queen's Prize at the annual National Artillery Association competition held at Shoeburyness.

The 'position artillery' concept was revived in 1888 when some Volunteer position batteries were reorganised to work alongside the Volunteer infantry brigades. The 1st Lanarkshire was nominated to operate two position batteries, each of four 16-Pounder Rifled Muzzle Loading guns and two wagons. The two batteries were manned by the personnel of four garrison batteries (including the former 16th). In 1900, the strength of the corps was increased to twenty batteries. As a result, eight more 16-pounder RML batteries were issued to it, and the whole corps was reorganised into ten position batteries, numbered 1st to 10th. These were divided into five brigades. As the corps was then entirely of position batteries, it was in 1901 styled a "position artillery corps", and in 1902 "heavy artillery". However, despite the new issue of equipment, harness was only provided for three batteries, making five in all. It wasn't until 1905 that harness for the remaining five was issued.

In November 1905 the Army Council agreed an experiment to convert some RGA Volunteers to a field artillery role. The 1st Lanarkshire RGA (V) was one of the units chosen to be re-equipped with Ehrhardt quick-firing (QF) guns, but a change in government early the following year put a stop to the experiment. Instead, the new Secretary of State for War, Richard Haldane, embarked on a thorough-going reorganisation of all the Army's auxiliary forces. In 1907-8, the 16-pounder guns were replaced by 15-pounder Breech Loading guns, which had been converted into quick-firers. The corps was the only one in Scotland composed entirely of heavy batteries.

== Territorial Force ==
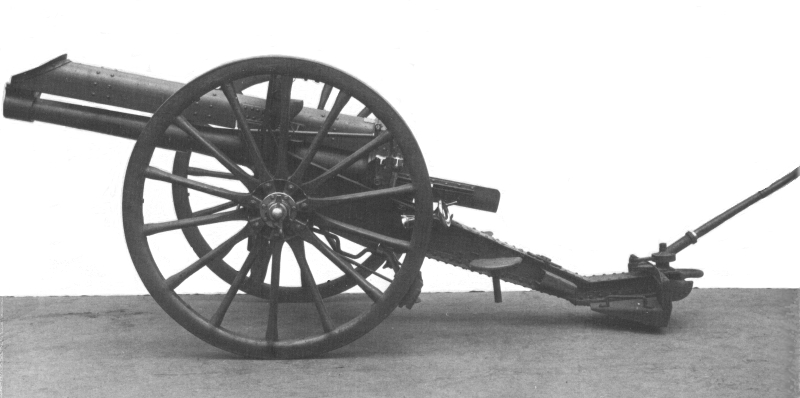
15-pounder gun, issued to TF field batteries.

The Volunteers were subsumed into the new Territorial Force (TF) under the Haldane Reforms of 1908 and the personnel of the 1st Lanarkshire RGA were distributed to two new units of the Royal Field Artillery (RFA):

III (or 3rd) Lowland Brigade

- HQ at 8 Newton Terrace, Charing Cross, Glasgow
- 1st City of Glasgow Battery at Berkeley Street, Charing Cross, Glasgow
- 2nd City of Glasgow Battery at Percy Street, Maryhill, Glasgow
- 3rd City of Glasgow Battery at Keppochhill, Springburn, Glasgow
- 3rd Lowland Ammunition Column at Percy Street, Maryhill, Glasgow

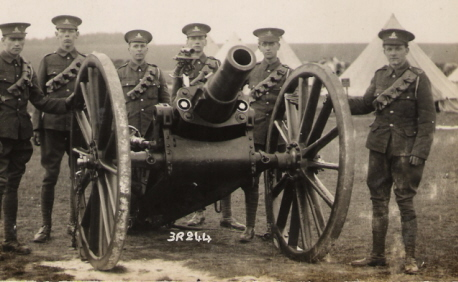
Territorial gunners training with a 5-inch howitzer before World War I.

IV (or 4th) Lowland (Howitzer) Brigade

- HQ at 8 Newton Terrace, Charing Cross, Glasgow
- 4th City of Glasgow (Howitzer) Battery at Butterbiggins Road, Govanhill, Glasgow
- 5th City of Glasgow Battery at Elder Street, Govan, Glasgow
- 4th Lowland (Howitzer) Ammunition Column at Butterbiggins Road, Govanhill, Glasgow

These units were part of the TF's Lowland Division. The field batteries were each issued with four 15-pounder guns and the howitzer batteries with four 5-inch howitzers.

== World War I ==
=== Mobilisation ===
The Lowland Division had been attending annual camp on the Ayrshire coast when the order to mobilise was received at 17.25 on Tuesday August 1914. Mobilisation began the following day at unit drill halls, and units undertook some guard duties until mobilisation was completed on 10 August, when the division went to its war stations as the mobile reserve in Scotland went to war stations, which for 1/III Bde was at Dunfermline.

On the outbreak of war, units of the TF were invited to volunteer for Overseas Service. On 15 August the WO issued instructions to separate those men who had signed up for Home Service only, and form these into reserve units. Then on 31 August the formation of a reserve or 2nd Line unit was authorised for each 1st Line unit where 60 per cent or more of the men had volunteered for Overseas Service. The titles of these 2nd Line units would be the same as the original, but distinguished by a '2/' prefix. In this way duplicate batteries, brigades and divisions were created, mirroring those TF formations being sent overseas.

During the winter of 1914–15 the 1st Lowland Division underwent war training and served in the Forth defences. It was warned for overseas service on 5 April and on 11 May 1915 it was officially numbered as the 52nd (Lowland) Division. The division was destined for the Dardanelles Campaign but it was decided that the difficulties of operating artillery on the Gallipoli Peninsula precluded taking all the divisional artillery. 1/III Lowland Brigade was therefore left behind when the division embarked, and remained in the Forth defences, while the howitzers of 1/IV Lowland Bde accompanied the division and served in the campaign (see below).

=== 1/III Lowland Brigade ===
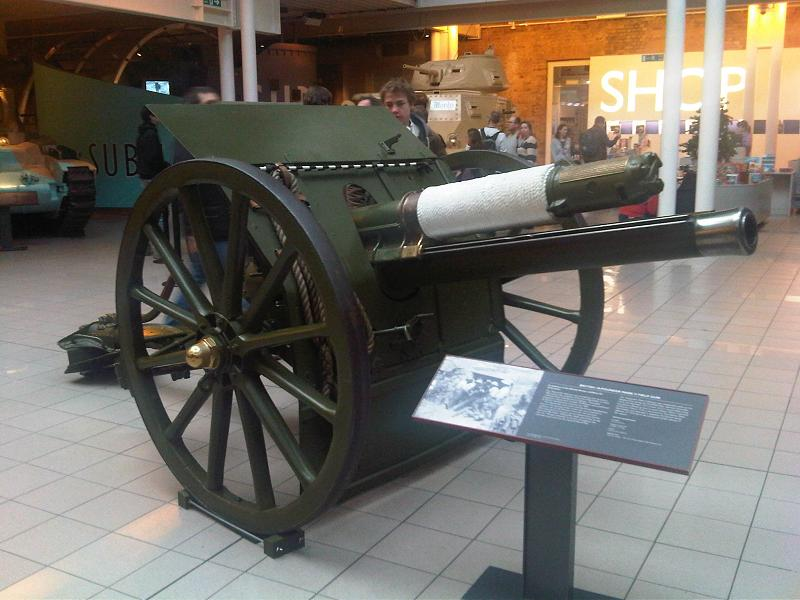
18-pounder field gun preserved at the Imperial War Museum.

==== Egypt ====
The brigade finally went overseas in early 1916. It was re-armed with modern 18-pounder guns and embarked on 27 February, landing at Alexandria in Egypt on 10 March to rejoin 52nd (L) Division at Kantara on 17 March. The division was then moving into No 3 Section of the Suez Canal defences. In May 1916 the TF brigades of the RFA received numbers, the 1/III Lowland becoming CCLXI (or 261) Brigade and the batteries became A, B and C. The guns were equipped with 'ped-rails', block of wood attached to the wheels to prevent them sinking into soft sand.

In May and June 52nd (L) Division advanced its outposts east of the canal to Romani, which prompted an aggressive response from the Turks. However, unlike the howitzers of CCLXII Bde (see below), CCLXI Bde was not engaged in the Battle of Romani on 4–5 August. The brigades of 52nd (L) Divisional Artillery were renumbered on 15 September, the former 1/III Lowland now becoming CCLXII (262) Brigade. (Note: The confusion was created because 1/I Lowland Bde, left behind when 52nd (L) Division sailed for Egypt, and now serving on the Western Front, had already been numbered CCLX (260), so the brigades serving with the division each had to shift by one place.)

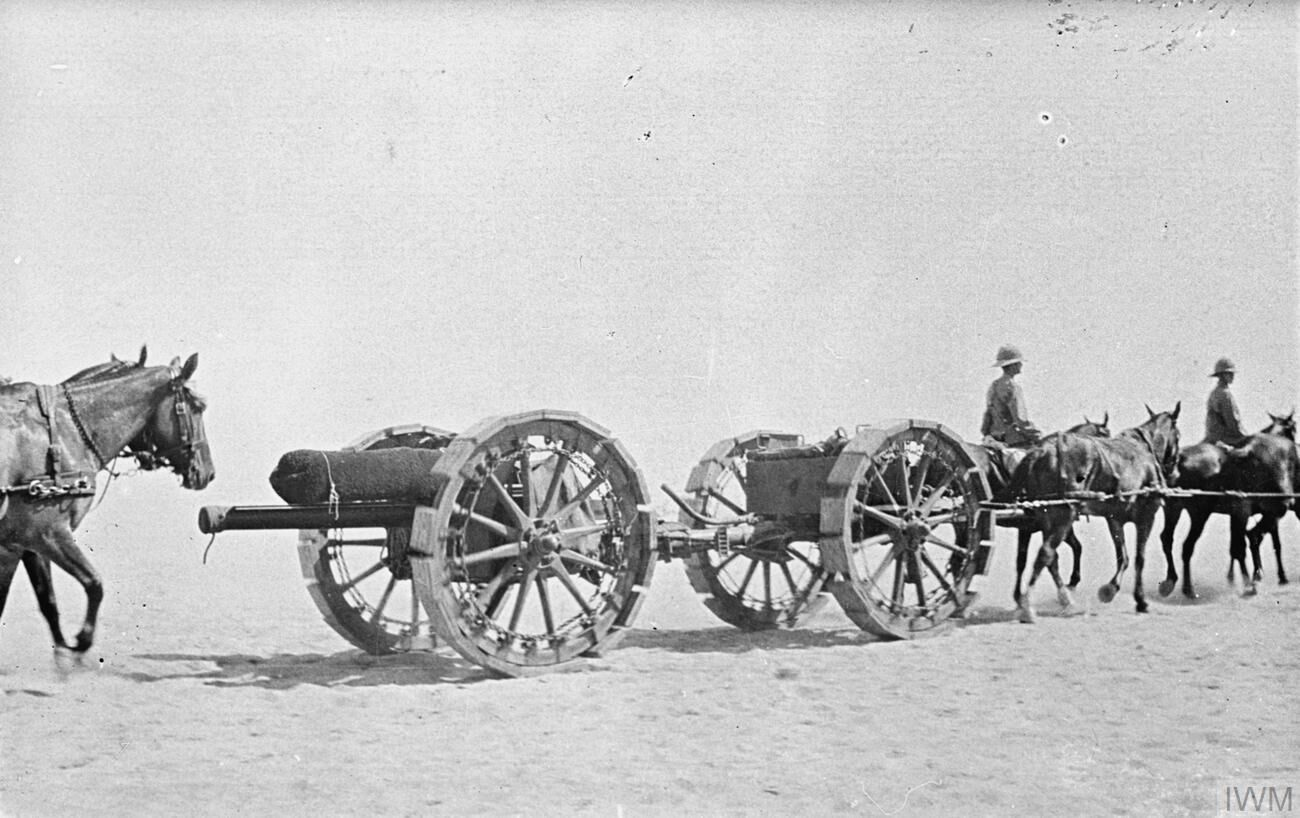
18-pounder with 'ped-rails' (sand wheels) in the Suez Canal area.

In September the Egyptian Expeditionary Force began preparing to mount an offensive into Palestine. For this advance 52nd (L) Divisional Artillery was organised into two groups, each of two 18-pdr batteries and one of 4.5-inch howitzers; C Bty of CCLXII Bde was left behind on the lines of communication, and B Bty of CCLXIII (Howitzer) Bde joined the group. 52nd (L) Division formed part of the Desert Column covering the extension of the railway and water pipeline into the Sinai Desert, and the head of the column reached El Arish, near the Palestine frontier, on 22 December.

On 25 December 1916 the divisional artillery was reorganised once more. C Bty of CCLXII Bde was brought up from the rear and then broken up, with one section going to each of the other batteries to bring them up to six guns each, and on 30 December B/CCLXIII Bty formally joined the brigade as C (Howitzer) Bty. Finally on 1 January 1917 the BACs were abolished and incorporated into the Divisional Ammunition Column, giving the brigade the following organisation:

- A Bty (1st City of Glasgow + half 3rd City of Glasgow Btys)
- B Bty (2nd City of Glasgow + half 3rd City of Glasgow Btys)
- C (H) Bty (5th City of Glasgow Bty)

==== Gaza ====
In March 1917 the EEF advanced against Gaza. 52nd (L) Division was in reserve and its Divisional Artillery was not engaged at the First Battle of Gaza (26–27 March), which failed to take the city. The division participated in a renewed attempt, the Second Battle of Gaza, beginning on 17 April. At dawn the leading infantry advanced towards Mansura Ridge, while CCLXII Bde under Lt-Col Farquhar began shelling the ridge. The infantry advanced without difficulty through the Turkish outposts on the ridge onto its objective, the El Sire Ridge beyond, although both artillery brigades suffered a number of casualties. The EEF's artillery then spent 18 April bombarding the Turkish main position, before attacking the following day. 52nd (L) Division's artillery was massed behind Mansura and east of El Sire. The howitzers fired gas shells for 40 minutes beginning at 05.30, followed by 80 minutes of high explosive (HE). The 18-pounders joined in for the last 10 minutes before the infantry assault went in, laying down a barrage on the objectives and then providing a Creeping barrage for the advance. 52nd (L) Division attacked the key Ali Muntar position, but it was soon obvious that the gas shelling had not suppressed the Turkish artillery and machine gun positions, and shortage of ammunition meant that these were never silenced. The Turkish artillery searched the El Sire Ridge and the area behind. At 11.00 the single tank on the division's front, 'War Baby', advanced under covering fire from the artillery and crushed the wire at Outpost Hill, allowing the infantry into the position, but it was then knocked out by Turkish artillery, and the Turks launched repeated counter-attacks. The rest of the attacks were held up, and Outpost Hill had to be abandoned after dark. The division's casualties had been very heavy, but the infantry dug in on the positions they had retained.

A period of trench warfare then set in, with occasional raids and frequent exchanges of artillery fire, in which 52nd (L) Divisional Artillery suffered numerous casualties in men and guns because of the superiority of enemy observation aircraft. Lieutenant-Col Farquhar transferred to CCLXI Bde when that unit's CO was badly wounded by a sniper; he was succeeded in command by Lt-Col J.C. Gaskell. In case of wire-tapping, units were given codenames for use on the telephone: these were based on Scottish football teams, with CCLXII RFA assigned 'Hibs' (as in Hibernian F.C.). On 1 July 1917 C (H) Bty left to join a reformed CCLXIV Bde, leaving CCLXII Bde with just two 18-pdr batteries.

The EEF was reorganised during the summer months and artillery ammunition supply improved. The offensive was renewed on 1 November 1917 with the Third Battle of Gaza. 52nd (L) Division was now in XXI Corps facing Gaza, where the preliminary bombardment began on 27 October. This was calculated to be the heaviest British bombardment of the war outside the Western Front. At 23.00 on 1 November the bombardment opened on the outpost of Umbrella Hill and was successful in cutting the wire, neutralising enemy fire and cutting off enemy HQs: 10 minutes later 156th (Scottish Rifles) Brigade attacked close behind the barrage and quickly took the hill. After a renewed bombardment 156th Bde attacked again at 03.00 on 2 November and took the front line trenches at El Arish Redoubt after a fierce fight. Just after 08.00 a large Turkish counter-attack began, and on which the whole of XXI Corps' artillery was turned and destroyed it. Having attracted attention to the Gaza front, the rest of the EEF broke through the Turkish lines further inland, beginning with the capture of Beersheba on 31 October. By 7 November, with the EEF's Desert Mounted Corps sweeping round into their rear, the Turks abandoned Gaza and 52nd (L) Division went in pursuit. The advance guard of 157th (Highland Light Infantry) Brigade consisted of 6th Battalion, Highland Light Infantry with a composite brigade of two batteries of CCLXIV Bde accompanied by A/CCLXII. Refitting their ped-rails, the field batteries advanced up the beach to cross the mouth of the Wadi Hesi and then turn to face inland while the rest of the division attacked 'Sausage Ridge'. The composite brigade duelled with a superior force of Turkish artillery. Four times the Lowland infantry were driven back off Sausage Ridge and at one point a Turkish counter-attack came along the beach within a few hundred yards of the infantry brigade HQ and the composite brigade's positions: gunners, HQ staff and the last infantry reserve manned a line while the guns were limbered up ready for withdrawal. However 6th HLI supported by B/CCLXII had moved further up the Wadi Hesi and put in a flank attack on the defenders of Sausage Ridge, which forced the Turks to retire and the danger passed.

The pursuit continued. 157th Brigade and B/CCLXII Bty were ordered to take Ashdod on 10 November. After an extremely difficult approach march they found the high ground to the east in enemy hands and immediately attacked, B Bty moving up rapidly to open fire despite enemy shellfire. The attack went in at 16.25, 15 minutes before sunset (which ended the observed artillery fire), and the position was taken by midnight. 157th Brigade joined the Australian 1st Light Horse Brigade at Ashdod, when both men and horses could be watered. The Turks still held a position at El Mughar, which XXI Corps assaulted after a 60-minute bombardment on 13 November. The important Junction Station fell to the British the day following the Battle of Mughar Ridge, while 52nd (L) Division's artillery made for Mansurah

On 19 November the EEF moved east into the Judaean Hills to begin closing in on Jerusalem. XXI Corps was sent to capture the Nebi Samwill ridge. The village itself was captured by surprise on 21 November, but moving artillery on the hill roads was difficult. The onset of heavy rain made the conditions worse, but by employing 10-horse teams, 52nd (L) Divisional Artillery got 10 guns (including a section of each of A and B/CCLXII) up for 75th Division's attack on El Jib on 23 November, described by the corps commander as 'a magnificent feat'. Although too late to prevent that attack from failing, the sections were in position in a dip in the ground south-east of Biddu when the attack was renewed next day by 52nd (L) Division. Nevertheless, that attack also failed, and while Nebi Samwill itself had been successfully held, the wider attacks were called off and 52nd (L) Division went into reserve. The Turks threw in fierce counter-attacks, but when they had been beaten off Jerusalem fell without a fight on 9 December.

52nd (L) Division had already marched out on 5 December to take over the line north of Jaffa on the coast. After a tough march it was overlooking the River Auja by 8 December. The Turks were in a strong position on the other side. To drive them out XXI Corps planned a 24-hour bombardment to launch the Battle of Jaffa, but 52nd (L) Division got infantry across the Auja during the night of 20/21 December, initially covered by the artillery's normal nightly fire, which then became a creeping barrage. The Royal Engineers then built bridges and the whole divisional artillery crossed during 22 December as the division advanced rapidly to Arsuf.

==== Megiddo ====
The division remained in the line near Arsuf until March 1918. The German spring offensive on the Western Front meant that urgent reinforcements were required, and 52nd (L) Division was sent. It was relieved in the line by 7th (Meerut) Division, but as part of the relief the whole of 52nd (L) Divisional Artillery was exchanged with 7th (Meerut) Divisional Artillery on 3 April 1918. The Lowland artillery served with this Indian Army formation in Palestine until the end of the war. On 5 April CCLXII Bde was joined by 438 (H) Bty with four 4.5-inch howitzers. (Note: Perry refers to 52nd (L) DA joining 7th (M) Division, but incorrectly lists CCLVII rather than CCLXII Bde.)

There was little activity in the coastal sector during the summer of 1918. On 28/29 May the divisional artillery supported an advance of about 1.5 miles (2.4 km), then on 8 June 7 (Meerut) Division seized the 'Two Sisters' hills being used as OPs by the Turks: the attack was launched at 03.45 after a 15-minuted bombardment. It also caused heavy casualties to the Turks when the division raided 'Piffer Ridge' on 27 July.

The EEF was now ready to launch its final offensive in Palestine, the Battle of Megiddo on 19 September. For XXI Corps' opening attack (the Battle of Sharon) there was no preparatory 'softening up' bombardment: when the guns opened fire at 04.30 it was the signal for the infantry to advance with 35 minutes' moonlight followed by 35 minutes darkness before dawn. The field guns bombarded the enemy front line positions until the infantry arrived, then the 18-pdrs lifted to begin a creeping barrage while the 4.5s concentrated on important targets beyond the barrage. On 7th (Meerut) Division's front the barrage advanced at a rate of 100 yards (91 m) per minute. Once it broke through the front line its attack on the crossings of the Zerqiye marsh was supported by the heavy artillery while its divisional artillery moved up. The division drive the Turks off a rearguard position at 15.00, and opposition ended. The advanced troops bivouacked in Taiyibe that night. The advanced guard of the Desert Mounted Corps had already passed through the division to begin the exploitation phase. XXI Corps continued the pressure next day, with 7th (Meerut) Division advancing in two columns. 21st Indian Brigade was supported by a mixed field brigade including two of the howitzer batteries and one 18-pdr battery, but under the hot sun the artillery horses were unable to go on. After a rest and drink at midday, the infantry continued advancing and outpaced the artillery.

The cavalry were now fanning out across the Plain of Sharon and all XXI Corps had to do was follow up. 7th (Meerut) Division reached Haifa and 29 September and set off in three columns for Beirut on 3 October. A composite RFA brigade went with Column C, following the advance guard and the engineers and pioneers who widened the 'Ladder of Tyre' route for artillery. Column C marched 96 miles (154 km) in 8 days After a few days' rest the advance continued, seeing few Turkish troops, and the Lowland gunners reached Tripoli on 26 October, having marched 270 miles (430 km) in 38 days. Hostilities with Turkey ended with the Armistice of Mudros on 30 October.

The Lowland Artillery remained at Tripoli until 22 November, suffering a large number of deaths from disease. The brigades then began moving back to Egypt, reaching Cairo on 20 December. In March 1919 there were civil disturbances in Egypt, and the gunners formed several mobile columns for patrol work. They remained at Abbassia Barracks outside Cairo until August, when their demobilisation was completed. CCLXI Brigade, RFA, was then placed in suspended animation.

=== 2/III Lowland Brigade ===
2/III Lowland Brigade was formed at its parent units' drill halls before the end of 1914. Training was held up by the lack of modern equipment, and then disrupted by the need to supply reinforcement drafts to the 1st Line. 2nd Lowland Division began to form in January 1915 and by August (when it became 65th (2nd Lowland) Division) was gathered in the Stirling area, with artillery brigades at Larbert and Tillicoultry. In March 1916 the division moved into England to join Southern Army (Home Forces), with its HQ at Chelmsford. 2/IV Lowland Bde was renumbered CCCXXVII (327) (H) Brigade, RFA, in May 1916 but was immediately broken up to provide howitzer batteries to other brigades in the division. These never went overseas and were disbanded in February–March 1918.

=== 1/IV Lowland Brigade ===
1/IV Lowland Brigade served with 52nd (Lowland) Division at Gallipoli, where its howitzers were the only guns of the division present. It was evacuated to Egypt, where it was numbered as CCLXII (or 262) (H) Brigade, RFA, and re-equipped with 4.5-inch howitzers. It fought in the Battle of Romani, then was renumbered CCLXIII (263) (H) Brigade in September 1916 but broken up at the end of the year.

=== 2/IV Lowland Brigade ===
2/IV Lowland Brigade served with 65th (Lowland) Division. It was renumbered CCCXXVIII (or 328) (H) Brigade, RFA in May 1916 but immediately broken up to provide howitzer batteries to other brigades in the division.

== Interwar years ==
When the TF was reformed on 7 February 1920, its RFA brigades consisted of four batteries, three of 18-pdrs and one of 4.5-inch howitzers, as they had at the end of the war. The five Glasgow batteries were therefore reformed, but III Lowland Bde now consisted of 1–4 Btys, while 5th City of Glasgow Bty was re-assigned to I Lowland Bde.< The following year the TF was reorganised as the Territorial Army (TA), and III Lowland Brigade rwas redesignated as the 80th (Lowland) Brigade, RFA. It continued to be part of 52nd (Lowland) Division and had the following organisation:

- HQ at 21 Taylor Street, Townhead, Glasgow
- 317 (1st City of Glasgow) Bty at Burkley Street, Glasgow
- 318 (2nd City of Glasgow) Bty at Percy Street, Maryhill, Glasgow
- 319 (3rd City of Glasgow) Bty at 21 Taylor Street, Townhead, Glasgow
- 320 (4th City of Glasgow) (Howitzer) Bty at Butterbiggins Road, Glasgow

The establishment of a TA divisional artillery brigade was four 6-gun batteries, three equipped with 18-pounders and one with 4.5-inch howitzers, all of World War I patterns. However, the batteries only held four guns in peacetime. The guns and their first-line ammunition wagons were still horsedrawn and the battery staffs were mounted. Partial mechanisation was carried out from 1927, but the guns retained iron-tyred wheels until pneumatic tyres began to be introduced just before World War II. In 1924 the RFA was subsumed into the Royal Artillery (RA), and the word 'Field' was inserted into the titles of its brigades and batteries.

The brigade changed its subtitle to 'Lowland – City of Glasgow' from August 1937. In 1938 the RA modernised its nomenclature and a lieutenant-colonel's command was designated a 'regiment' rather than a 'brigade'; this applied to TA field brigades from 1 November 1938.

== World War II ==
=== Mobilisation ===
The TA was doubled in size after the Munich Crisis of 1938, and most regiments split to form duplicates. Part of the reorganisation was that field artillery regiments changed from four six-gun batteries to an establishment of two batteries, each of three four-gun troops. For the 80th (Lowland – City of Glasgow) Fd Rgt this resulted in the following organisation from 31 March 1939:

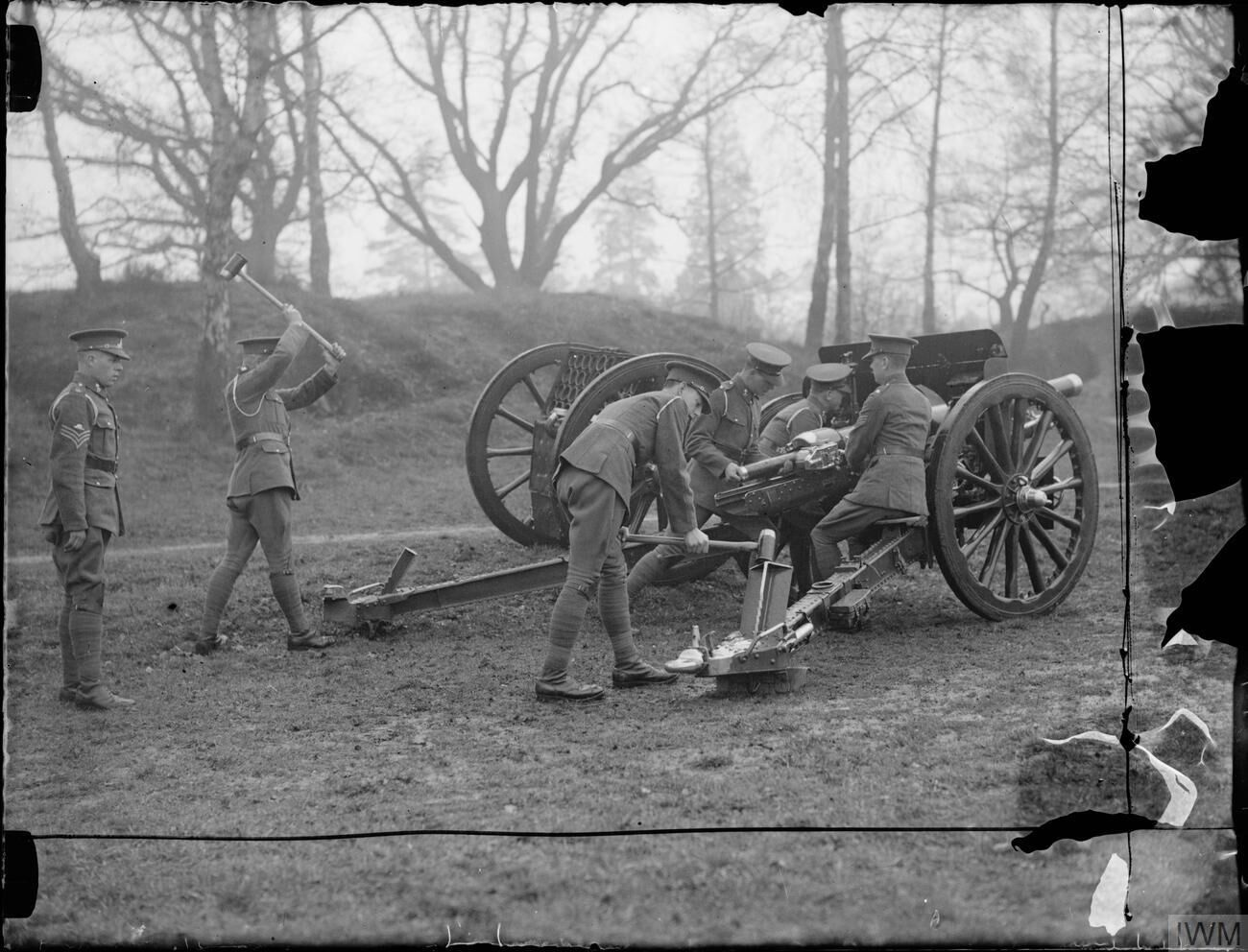
Emplacing an 18-pounder with wooden wheels at the start of World War II.

80th (Lowland – City of Glasgow) Field Regiment, Royal Artillery

- Regimental Headquarters (RHQ) at Glasgow
- 317 (1st City of Glasgow) Field Bty at Glasgow
- 318 (2nd City of Glasgow) Field Bty at Maryhill

131st Field Regiment, Royal Artillery

- RHQ at Glasgow
- 319 (3rd City of Glasgow) Field Bty at Glasgow
- 320 (4th City of Glasgow) Field Bty at Townhead

=== 80th (Lowland - City of Glasgow) Field Regiment ===
52nd (Lowland) Division's insignia.

80th Field Regiment mobilised in 52nd (Lowland) Infantry Division. Apart from a period in June 1940 when the rest of the division was briefly deployed to France, the regiment served with the 52nd (L) Division throughout the war. One of the lessons learned from the Battle of France was that the two-battery organisation did not work: field regiments were intended to support an infantry brigade of three battalions. As a result, they were reorganised into three 8-gun batteries. 80th Fd Rgt formed 458 Fd Bty within the regiment by May 1941.

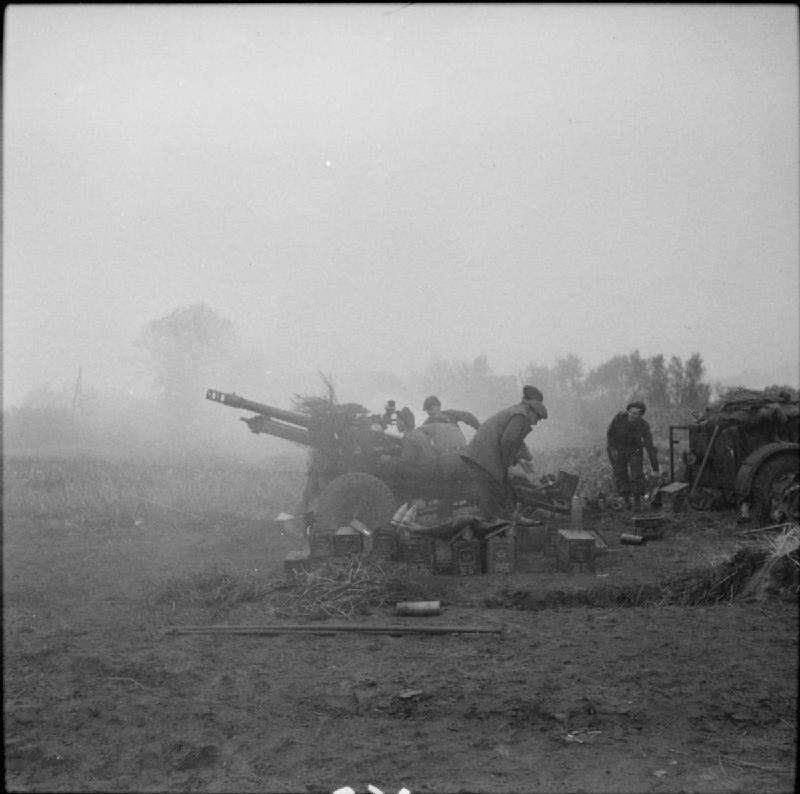
25-pounders in action in North West Europe, 1944.

52nd (L) Division served in Home Forces for most of the war, undergoing training in mountain warfare and air-portable operations before eventually going into action at sea level in the Battle of the Scheldt in October 1940. It then took part in the fighting in the Rhineland (Operations Blackcock and Veritable), and then the drive to Bremen. The regiment was placed in suspended animation on 5 May 1946 in British Army of the Rhine (BAOR).

=== 131st (Lowland - City of Glasgow) Field Regiment ===
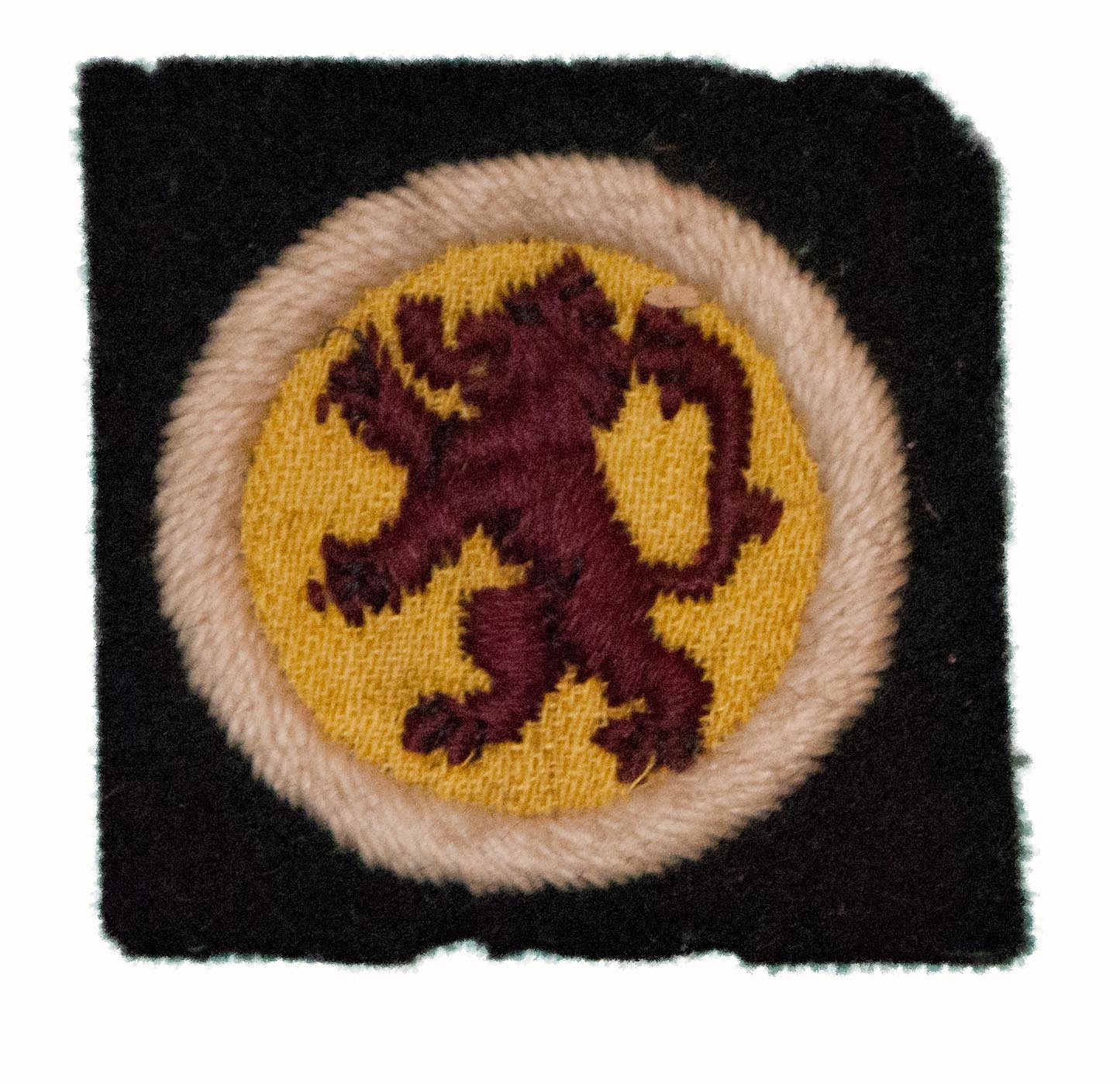
15th (Scottish) Division's insignia.

131st Field Regiment mobilised in 15th (Scottish) Infantry Division and served with it throughout the war. The regiment formed its third battery, 496, on 27 February 1941, and received its 'Lowland - City of Glasgow' subtitle in 1942.

After serving in home defence, 15th (S) Division fought in Normandy (Operation Overlord) and through the campaign in North West Europe, where 131st Fd Rgt distinguished itself in the action at Asten on 28–29 October 1944. It was placed in suspended animation on 9 January 1946 and formally disbanded when the TA was reconstituted in 1947.

== Postwar ==
When the TA was reconstituted on 1 January 1947, 80th (L) Fd Rgt reformed as 280th (Lowland – City of Glasgow) Medium Rgt, reverting to being a field regiment in 1950. In 1955 the subtitle was changed to 'City of Glasgow Artillery'. The regiment formed part of 85 (Field) Army Group Royal Artillery, which was redesignated HQ RA 52nd (Lowland) Division in 1950. The regiment had the following organisation:

- RHQ at Glasgow
- P (1st City of Glasgow) Bty
- Q (2nd City of Glasgow) Bty
- R (3rd City of Glasgow) Bty

With the ending of National Service there was a reduction of the TA in 1961, and most of the regiment amalgamated with 279th (Ayrshire) Fd Rgt to form 279th (City of Glasgow & Ayrshire) Fd Rgt:

- RHQ at Troon
- P (1st City of Glasgow) Bty
- Q (Ayrshire) Bty
- R (3rd City of Glasgow) Bty

Surplus personnel of 280th Fd Rgt transferred to 445th (Lowland) Light Anti-Aircraft Rgt.

=== Lowland Regiment, RA ===
When the TA was reduced into the Territorial and Army Volunteer Reserve in 1967, the Lowland regiments of the RA amalgamated to form The Lowland Regiment, RA (Territorial), in TAVR III (Home Defence), with the following organisation:

- RHQ at Glasgow
- HQ (City of Glasgow) Bty at Glasgow – from 279 (City of Glasgow & Ayrshire) Fd Rgt
- P (Clyde & Renfrewshire, Argyll & Sutherland Highlanders) Bty at Port Glasgow – from 277 (Argyll & Sutherland Highlanders) Fd Rgt
- Q (City of Edinburgh) Bty at Edinburgh – from 278 (Lowland) Fd Rgt (City of Edinburgh Artillery)'
- R (Paisley, Argyll & Sutherland Highlanders) Bty at Paisley, Renfrewshire– 277 (Argyll & Sutherland Highlanders) Fd Rgt
- S (Ayrshire) Bty at Troon – from 279 (City of Glasgow & Ayrshire) Fd Rgt
- T (Glasgow) Bty at Glasgow – from 445th (Lowland) Light Air Defence Rgt

In 1969 TAVR III was disbanded and the Lowland Regiment was reduced to a cadre under 102 (Ulster & Scottish) Light Air Defence Rgt (Volunteers). Some men of HQ Bty joined 207 Bty of 102 Rgt; some of R Bty joined 102 (Clyde) Field Squadron, 71 Engineer Regiment, Royal Engineers; some of S Bty joined a dispersed Troop of 222 Squadron, 154 (Scottish) Regiment, Royal Corps of Transport at Troon, while some of T Bty joined a Trp of 221 Sqn of the same regiment dispersed to Port Glasgow.

The cadre of the Lowland Rgt was formally disbanded on 1 April 1975, but in 1986 105 (Scottish) Air Defence Regiment was designated as its successor unit.

== Uniforms and insignia ==
The original uniform of all the Lanarkshire AVCs was similar to that of the Royal Artillery, with busbies and white waist-belts, but with scarlet cuffs and forage caps with scarlet bands.

A brass shoulder title consisting of T over RFA over CITY OF GLASGOW was worn by all batteries of 3rd and 4th Lowland Brigades from 1908. In 1931, Lord Lyon King of Arms authorised a regimental crest for 80th Fd Bde consisting of a field gun surmounted by an oak tree bearing a robin and bell, taken from the Coat of arms of Glasgow. Above the tree was a King's crown and scroll inscribed with the RA motto 'UBIQUE' ('Everywhere'). Below the gun was a three-part scroll inscribed 'CITY OF GLASGOW ARTILLERY'. The crest was used on leatherheads, Christmas cards etc. However, from 1955 the design was used as a collar badge (gilt for officers, brass for other ranks) by 280th (City of Glasgow) Fd Rgt.

== Commanding officers ==
The commanding officers of the unit included:

- Lt-Col Wm. S. S. Crawford, 7 February 1861
- Lt-Col Jas. Keid Stewart, 12 May 1862
- Lt-Col John Kidston (hon. col.), 10 March 1875
- Lt-Col Robt. J. Bennett, VD, (hon. col.), 27 September 1890
- Lt-Col Alexr. B. Grant, MVO, VD, (hon. col.) 2 January 1895
- Lt-Col Archibald Mclnnes Shaw, VD (hon. col.), 16 November 1907

== Honorary Colonels ==
The following served as Honorary Colonel of the unit:

- William S.S. Crawford (former CO), appointed 8 January 1870
- William Cavendish-Bentinck, 6th Duke of Portland, appointed 8 March 1884
- Sir Charles Cayzer, 1st Baronet, appointed 23 March 1898, continued with 3rd Lowland Brigade
- Alexander B. Grant, MVO, VD, (former CO) appointed to 4th Lowland Brigade 23 November 1912
- Sir Archibald McInnes Shaw, CB, VD, (former CO) appointed to 80th Lowland Brigade 21 December 1921

== Prominent members ==
Dr George Beatson, the cancer specialist, joined the 1st Lanarkshire AV when he moved to Glasgow in 1878 (promoted to lieutenant 26 June 1880 and captain 22 July 1885). In 1890 he left to become commanding officer of the Glasgow companies of the Volunteer Medical Corps, and was later Principal Medical Officer of the Lowland Division.
