= 263rd Brigade =

263rd Brigade may refer to:

- 263rd Brigade, Royal Field Artillery, United Kingdom
- 263rd Air Defense Artillery Brigade, United States
