= Wadi el Hesi =

Survey of Palestine map (1934-1939). "Hesi" is the river marked on the map as lying between Gaza and Al Majdal and the river to the south is Wadi Gaza

Wadi el Hesi is one of two major river valleys and seasonal streams along the coast of southern Palestine that lies 12 miles (19 km) to the north of Wadi Gaza and flows parallel to it. Its name appears often in accounts of the history of the region, as an impressive natural feature of the landscape, border area and site of battles. There are numerous archaeological sites along the length of Wadi el Hesi, including Tell el Hesi which takes its name from the valley.

In the 13th century, Wadi el Hesi was the border between the Crusader kingdom of Ascalon and Gaza.

During World War I, it was the site of multiple battles that ended with the capture of Wadi el Hesi by British forces on November 9, 1917. During the 1948 Arab-Israeli war, the Yiftah Brigade sabotaged a bridge and railway track in Wadi el Hesi in an attempt to separate Egyptian troops north of Beit Hanoun from the rest of Egyptian forces stationed in the Gaza Strip.

Following the establishment of Israel in parts of Palestine in 1948, Wadi el Hesi came under Israeli rule and was given the name "Nahal Shiqma".

== Bibliography ==
- Bruce, Anthony (2002). The Last Crusade: The Palestine Campaign in the First World War. London: John Murray. ISBN 978-0-7195-5432-2.
- Crombie, Kelvin (1998). Anzacs, Empires, and Israel's Restoration (1798-1948). Vocational Education & Training Publications. ISBN 978-0-646-35298-5.
- Falls, Cyril (1930). Military Operations Egypt & Palestine: From June 1917 to the End of the War. Official History of the Great War Based on Official Documents by Direction of the Historical Section of the Committee of Imperial Defence. Vol. 2 Part I. A. F. Becke (maps). London: H.M. Stationery Office. OCLC 644354483.
