= 4th Lowland Brigade, Royal Field Artillery =

IV Lowland Brigade, RFA
- Royal Artillery cap badge
- Active: 1 May 1908–30 December 1916
- Country: United Kingdom
- Branch: Territorial Force
- Type: Artillery Brigade
- Role: Field artillery
- Size: 2 Batteries
- Part of: 52nd (Lowland) Division
- Garrison/HQ: Charing Cross, Glasgow
- Nickname(s): 'The Glasgow Howitzers'
- Engagements: Battle of Gully Ravine; Battle of Lone Pine; Battle of Chunuk Bair; Battle of Scimitar Hill; Battle of Romani

The IV (4th) Lowland (Howitzer) Brigade, Royal Field Artillery was a new unit formed when Britain's Territorial Force was created in 1908. Its origins lay in the 1st Lanarkshire Artillery Volunteers formed in Glasgow, Scotland, in the 1860s. During World War I the brigade served at Gallipoli and in Egypt. It was broken up in 1916, but its individual batteries served on with other Scottish artillery units for the rest of the war and into World War II.

== Origin ==
When the Volunteer Force was subsumed into the new Territorial Force (TF) on 1 May 1908 under the Haldane Reforms, the 1st Lanarkshire Royal Garrison Artillery (Volunteers) split to form two brigades (Note: In contemporary RA usage a brigade was a lieutenant-colonel's command consisting of independent batteries 'brigaded' together; it was not comparable with an infantry or cavalry brigade commanded by a brigadier-general.) in the Royal Field Artillery, the III (Lowland) Brigade, RFA, armed with field guns, and the IV Lowland (Howitzer) Brigade, RFA, with the following organisation:

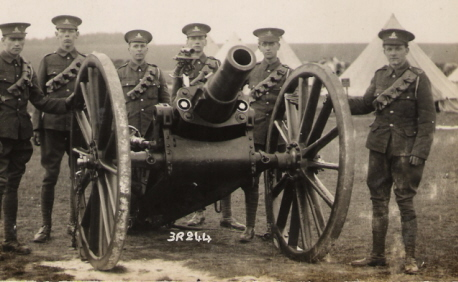
BL 5-inch howitzer and TF gunners in camp before the First World War

IV Lowland (Howitzer) Brigade, RFA

- Brigade Headquarters (HQ) at 8 Newton Terrace, Charing Cross, Glasgow (shared with III Lowland Bde)
- 4th City of Glasgow (Howitzer) Battery at Butterbiggins Road, Govanhill, Glasgow
- 5th City of Glasgow (Howitzer) Battery at Rider Street, Govan, Glasgow (from Nos 6 and 7 Heavy batteries, 1st Lanarkshire)
- IV Lowland (Howitzer) Brigade Ammunition Column (BAC) at Butterbiggins Road (added 16 October 1908)

Armed with four horsedrawn Breech-loading 5-inch howitzers each, the batteries of IV Brigade were intended to provide indirect fire support for the TF's Lowland Division. On the outbreak of World War I the brigade was commanded by a Regular officer, Major H.C. Sheppard, who held the temporary rank of lieutenant-colonel in the TF.

== World War I ==
=== Mobilisation ===
The Lowland Division had been attending annual camp on the Ayrshire coast when the order to mobilise was received at 17.25 on Tuesday August 1914. Mobilisation began the following day at unit drill halls, and units undertook some guard duties until mobilisation was completed on 10 August, when the division went to its war stations as the mobile reserve in Scotland. IV Lowland Bde was stationed at Stirling, later at Tillicoultry.

On the outbreak of war, units of the TF were invited to volunteer for Overseas Service. On 15 August the WO issued instructions to separate those men who had signed up for Home Service only, and form these into reserve units. Then on 31 August the formation of a reserve or 2nd Line unit was authorised for each 1st Line unit where 60 per cent or more of the men had volunteered for Overseas Service. The titles of these 2nd Line units would be the same as the original, but distinguished by a '2/' prefix. In this way duplicate batteries, brigades and divisions were created, mirroring those TF formations being sent overseas.

During the winter of 1914–15 the 1st Lowland Division underwent war training and served in the Forth defences. It was warned for overseas service on 5 April and on 11 May 1915 it was officially numbered as the 52nd (Lowland) Division. The division was destined for the Dardanelles Campaign but it was decided that the difficulties of operating artillery on the Gallipoli peninsula precluded taking all the divisional artillery. Several brigade were therefore left behind when the division embarked, and remained in the Forth defences, but the obsolescent howitzers of 1/IV Lowland Bde did accompany the division.

=== 1/IV Lowland Brigade ===
1/IV Lowland Brigade boarded the Mercian at Devonport on 2 June 1916, accompanied by a section of 1/1st Ayrshire Bty and the 2nd Lowland BAC. Although the first ships carrying 52nd (L) Division arrived off Gallipoli only one infantry brigade actually landed and the rest were diverted to Egypt. The Mercianarrived at Port Said on 15 June, but the brigade sailed again two days later and arrived off Mudros on 20 June. Brigade HQ and 1/4th Glasgow Bty landed at Cape Helles on 21 June, followed by 1/5th Glasgow Bty at Anzac Cove on 24 June. High-angle howitzers were deemed more useful among the gullies and trenches of the peninsula than the flat-trajectory 15-pdrs, so the two batteries of 1/IV Lowland Bde were the only artillery from 52nd (L) Division to see action in the campaign.

==== Gully Ravine ====
The night after they landed at Helles the Glasgow men of 1/4th Bty took their guns by the coast road below the cliffs from W Beach to a position by Gully Ravine, using horses loaned by a Regular battery. The position chosen was at the end of a narrow tip of land separating Gully Ravine from the sea. The battery had everything camouflaged before dawn, and by the evening of 24 June had gun-pits ready, dugouts cut into the side of the cliff, and observation posts (OPs) established in the forward trenches, with telephone lines laid back 2,000 yards (1,800 m) to the guns. An attack in this sector had failed on 4 June because of the lack of howitzer support; 1/4th Glasgow Bty and two French howitzers were positioned to overcome this when the attack was renewed (the Battle of Gully Ravine). 1/4th Glasgow Bty's role was to support 29th Division advancing up the coast on the left of the line. A two-hour bombardment began at 09.00 on 28 June, supplemented by naval gunfire. The howitzers' primary target was the 'Boomerang Redoubt' overhanging Gully Ravine, which was attacked by 1st Battalion, Border Regiment 15 minutes before the main assault. The Turks here were dazed by the bombardment by 1/4th Bty's four old howitzers (Note: 52nd (Lowland) London Division's historian claimed that some of the howitzers had seen action of the Battle of Omdurman in 1898.) and the two French howitzers, and put up little resistance. The second wave of 29th Division, passing through at 11.30, quickly took two more lines of Turkish trenches with the support of the howitzers. Unfortunately, the brigade of 52nd (L) Division attacking on the right of 29th Division was given no artillery support at all, and most of its attack failed, with very heavy casualties. 1/4th Glasgow Bty had only needed to fire 363 of the 400 rounds allocated to it, and so could have made a contribution, but no arrangements had been made to switch fire across the front. The British artillery at Helles helped to drive off Turkish attacks on 4–5 July, but French guns had to be borrowed for 52nd (L) Division's attack at Achi Baba Nullah on 12–13 July, and 1/4th Glasgow Bty was not called upon.

==== Anzac ====
1/5th Glasgow Bty under Maj R.R. Stewart had landed at Anzac Cove further up the coast on 24 June where it came under the command of the Australian and New Zealand Army Corps (Anzac). All the artillery at Anzac Cove struggled under severe disadvantages: there were limited gun sites available, and these were mostly overlooked from Turkish positions. Nevertheless the gunners did their best to support the men in the front line by harassing the Turkish artillery. Brigade HQ and 1/4th Bty moved by sea from Helles to join 1/5th Bty at Anzac, landing on the nights of 27/28 and 29/29 July. It took around 100 men on drag-ropes to get each gun into position, but each was ready, with its ammunition, by dawn. At 05.00 on 6 August the Glasgow Howitzers opened fire in support of the Australians' attack on Lone Pine Ridge, which was captured by 18.30. On the following day the howitzers were turned onto 'German Officers' Trench', which had resisted all previous attacks. Early in the afternoon the howitzers assisted in dispersing a Turkish force massing for a counter-attack. During the night the howitzers joined other artillery in bombarding Chunuk Bair, but the attack on 8 August was driven off the heights by Turkish reinforcements. Having fired all day, the Glasgow gunners spent the night of 8/9 August replenishing their ammunition, then from 05.15 all the guns pounded the Turkish positions for another assault on Chunuk Bair. However, the troops were driven off again on 10 August.

==== Suvla ====
A further Landing at Suvla Bay had been made on 6 August to support the attacks at Anzac. 1/IV Lowland Bde had been earmarked to be released for Suvla on the night of 7 August, but it remained at Anzac during the Turkish counter-attacks on Chunuk Bair and it was not until 20 August that Brigade HQ and 1/4th Bty moved up the coast to assist in the renewed offensive next day (the Battle of Scimitar Hill). The bombardment only lasted 30 minutes because ammunition was so short, and unfortunately the two hills that formed the objective – Scimitar and Ismail Oglu Tepe – were covered in mist on the day, so the gunners could not observe their fire: the attack was another failure.

By now the brigade's old 5-inch howitzers were very worn and inaccurate – sometimes 500 yards (460 m) in error – with no means of effecting repairs. In addition sickness thinned the ranks of all units of the Mediterranean Expeditionary Force (MEF). By 3 September 1/5th Glasgow Bty was down to one officer and 20 other ranks (ORs) with the guns (from an establishment of five officers and 194 ORs). If there was an SOS call during the night the sentries had to run from one pre-laid gun to another to fire them. 1/4th Glasgow Bty was slightly better off, but at one point was down to two officers and 35 ORs. Both batteries also had to maintain their OPs as well as man the guns. Lieutenant-Col Sheppard was one of these hospitalised by sickness, on 27 September, and command of the brigade devolved on Captain W. Watson, all the senior officers being in hospital. However, little firing was possible: except in emergencies the daily allowance was two shells per gun.

By early winter the decision had been made to shut down the campaign and evacuate the troops from Gallipoli. During the first week in December 1/4th Glasgow Bty was withdrawn from its position on Chocolate Hill to Lala Baba near the coast. The two batteries, 1/4th at Suvla and 1/5th at Anzac, were detailed to form part of the rearguard. The forces were thinned out over several days, the older guns staying to keep up the impression of active defence, until the last slipped away on the night of 19/20 December. 1/5th Glasgow Bty had to leave one of its old 5-inch howitzers behind at Anzac, but it was blown up after dark. Cape Helles was also evacuated on the night of 8/9 January 1916, when 52nd (L) Division's infantry were withdrawn to Imbros and then to Egypt.

==== Egypt ====
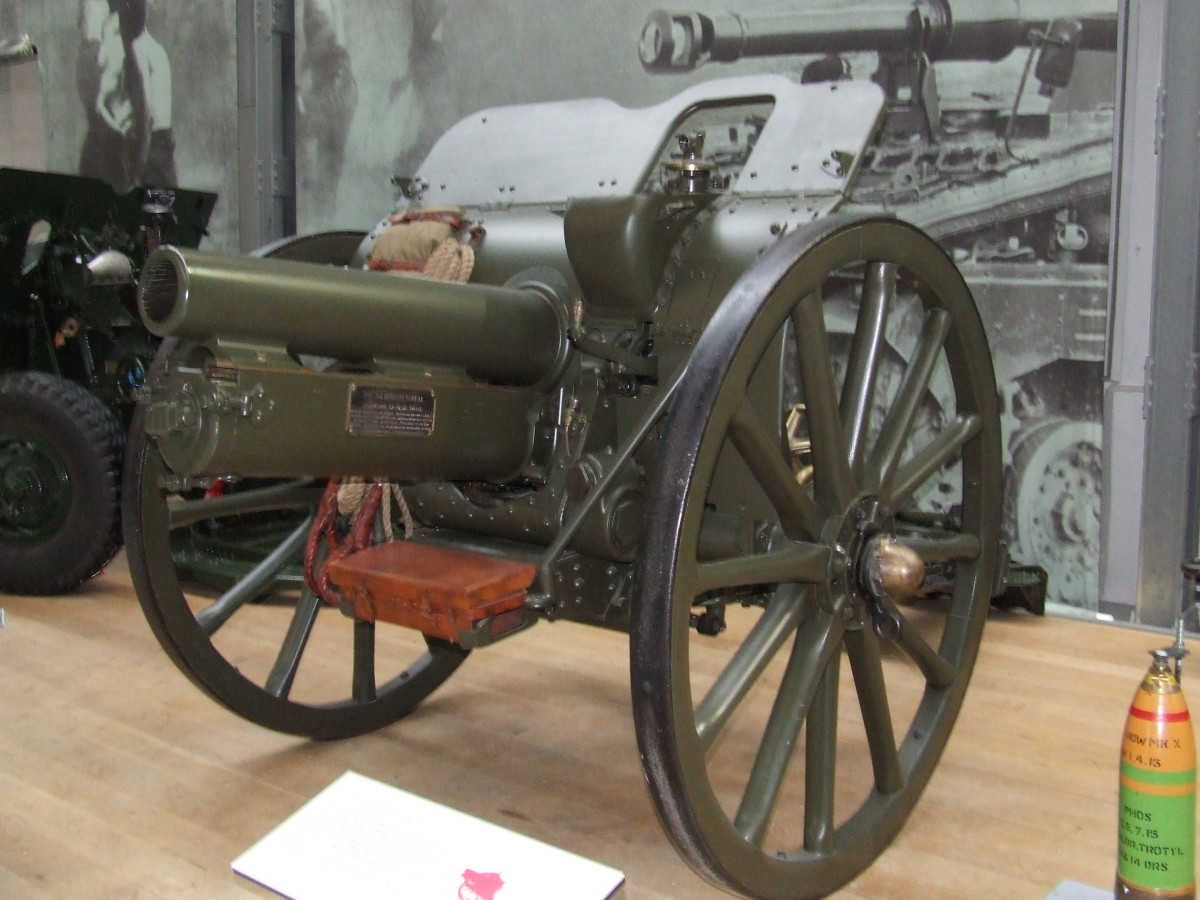
4.5-inch howitzer preserved at the Royal Artillery Museum.

The troops who had been evacuated from Gallipoli were progressively shipped to Egypt, where they were reinforced and re-equipped. 1/IV Lowland Bde, now commanded by Lt-Col G.S. Simpson (pre-war commander of 4th Glasgow Bty), rejoined 52nd (L) Division at Cairo on 11 January 1916. In March it moved to Kantara, where the division was moving into No 3 Section of the Suez Canal defences.

In May 1916 the TF brigades of the RFA received numbers, 1/IV Lowland (H) Bde becoming CCLXII (or 262) (H) Bde, RFA, and the batteries were designated A and B. The brigade was re-equipped with modern 4.5-inch howitzers on 28 June. The guns were equipped with 'ped-rails', blocks of wood attached to the wheels to prevent them sinking into soft sand.

In May and June the infantry of 52nd (L) Division advanced their outposts east of the canal to Romani, and began constructing redoubts. Both batteries of CCLXII Bde moved out to join them in July. This movement prompted an aggressive response from the Turks, who sent a large force across the desert to attack.

==== Romani ====
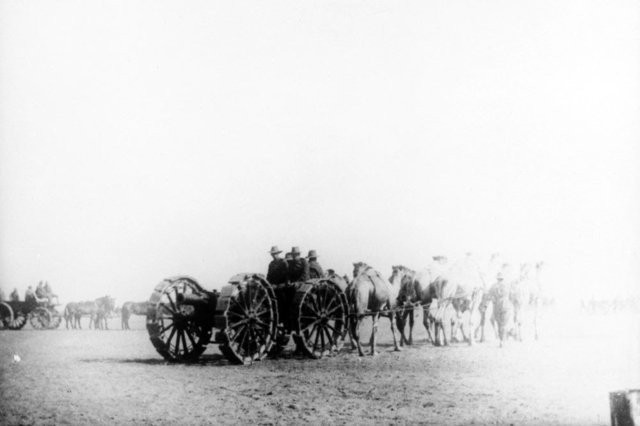
4.5-inch Howitzer with 'ped-rails'.

When the Turks attacked on 4 August (the Battle of Romani), the two howitzer batteries, together with one 18-pounder gun battery (B Bty from CCLX Bde), formed No 1 Group under Lt-Col Simpson stationed in the railway loop in the centre of No 3 Section. The Glasgow batteries had not previously had a chance to fire their new howitzers, and ammunition was limited, but from 05.40 their forward observation officer on the ridge behind began to give them targets. By 06.25 the Turks were working their way up to Redoubts 3 and 4 and digging in: A Bty of the Glasgow Howitzers under Maj Watson was turned on them to good effect. Then, as the Turkish attack moved round the British right flank, B Bty and the 18-pdrs of B/CCLX had to reposition their guns under enemy bullets, shells and aircraft bombs. Whenever a gun could be spared by one of the howitzer batteries, it was used as an improvised anti-aircraft gun. As the Turks gathered behind 'Wellington Ridge' for another attack B/CCLX Bde fired Shrapnel shell over the reverse slope and then when the attackers came over the ridge they suffered heavy casualties from the crossfire of the artillery batteries and machine gun and rifle fire from the redoubts. The Turks continued to 'dribble' men forward, who took cover in hollows, but the howitzers lobbed shells into them, making them death-traps. By mid-day the situation was well in hand and the artillery were able to conserve ammunition in the afternoon while the mounted troops began counter-attacking. Next morning the Turks left behind Wellington Ridge surrendered. The British artillery casualties had been very small.

==== Reorganisation ====
After a short pursuit the British remained in their positions for several months. CCLXII Brigade was renumbered as CCLXIII (263) Brigade on 15 September. (Note: The confusion was created because 1/I Lowland Bde, left behind when 52nd (L) Division sailed for Egypt, and now serving on the Western Front, had already been numbered CCLX (260), so the brigades serving with the division each had to shift by one place.) In September the Egyptian Expeditionary Force began preparing to mount an offensive into Palestine. For this advance 52nd (L) Divisional Artillery was organised into two groups, each of two 18-pdr gun batteries and one of 4.5-inch howitzers: A/CCLXIII (H) Bty joined No 1 Group formed by CCLXI Bde, and B/CCLXIII (H) Bth joined No 2 Group with CCLXII Bde. 52nd (L) Division formed part of the Desert Column covering the extension of the railway and water pipeline into the Sinai Desert, and the head of the column reached El Arish, near the Palestine frontier, on 22 December.

At the end of 1916 the divisional artillery was reorganised once more. On 30 December the detached A and B/CCLXIII (H) Btys formally joined the other two brigades as their C (Howitzer) Bty: A (former 1/4th Glasgow) Bty became C (H) Bty of CCLXI Bde (former II Lowland Bde) and B (former 1/5th Glasgow) Bty became C (H) Bty of CCLXII (former III Lowland Bde). Finally on 1 January 1917 the BACs were abolished and incorporated into the Divisional Ammunition Column, and CCLXIII (H) Bde HQ was disbanded. (Lieutenant-Col Simpson later commanded CCLXI Bde.) (Note: Afterwards the V Lowland Brigade, which had been renumbered CCLXIV in September, reverted to its original number of CCLXIII.)

The two batteries continued serving with their new brigades until the end of the war, including the Second and Third Battles of Gaza and the operations to capture Jerusalem in 1917. In April 1918 the 52nd (Lowland) Division was sent as reinforcements to the Western Front, but its divisional artillery transferred to the 7th (Meerut) Division, and fought with that British Indian Army formation at the Battle of Megiddo and the final advance into Ottoman Syria. The batteries were demobilised in 1919.

=== 2/IV Lowland Brigade ===
2/IV Lowland Brigade was formed at its parent units' drill halls before the end of 1914. Training was held up by the lack of modern equipment, and then disrupted by the need to supply reinforcement drafts to the 1st Line. 2nd Lowland Division began to form in January 1915 and by August (when it became 65th (2nd Lowland) Division) was gathered in the Stirling area, with artillery brigades at Larbert and Tillicoultry. In March 1916 the division moved into England to join Southern Army (Home Forces), with its HQ at Chelmsford. 2/IV Lowland Bde was renumbered CCCXXVIII (328) (H) Brigade, RFA, in May 1916 but was immediately broken up to provide howitzer batteries to other brigades in the division. These never went overseas and were disbanded in February–March 1918.

== Disbandment ==
When the TF was reformed on 7 February 1920 4th Lowland Brigade was not reformed; instead 4th City of Glasgow Bty was incorporated into the reformed 3rd Lowland Bde (soon to become 80th (Lowland) Brigade, RFA) and 5th City of Glasgow Bty was transferred to the Edinburgh-based 1st Lowland Bde (78th (Lowland) Brigade, RFA). These batteries retained their identities until the end of World War II.

== Honorary Colonel ==
Colonel A.B. Grant, MVO, VD, former Colonel-Commandant of the 1st Lanarkshire Artillery, was appointed Honorary Colonel of IV Lowland Brigade on 23 November 1912.
