= RML 16-pounder 12 cwt =

RML 16-pounder 12 cwt gun
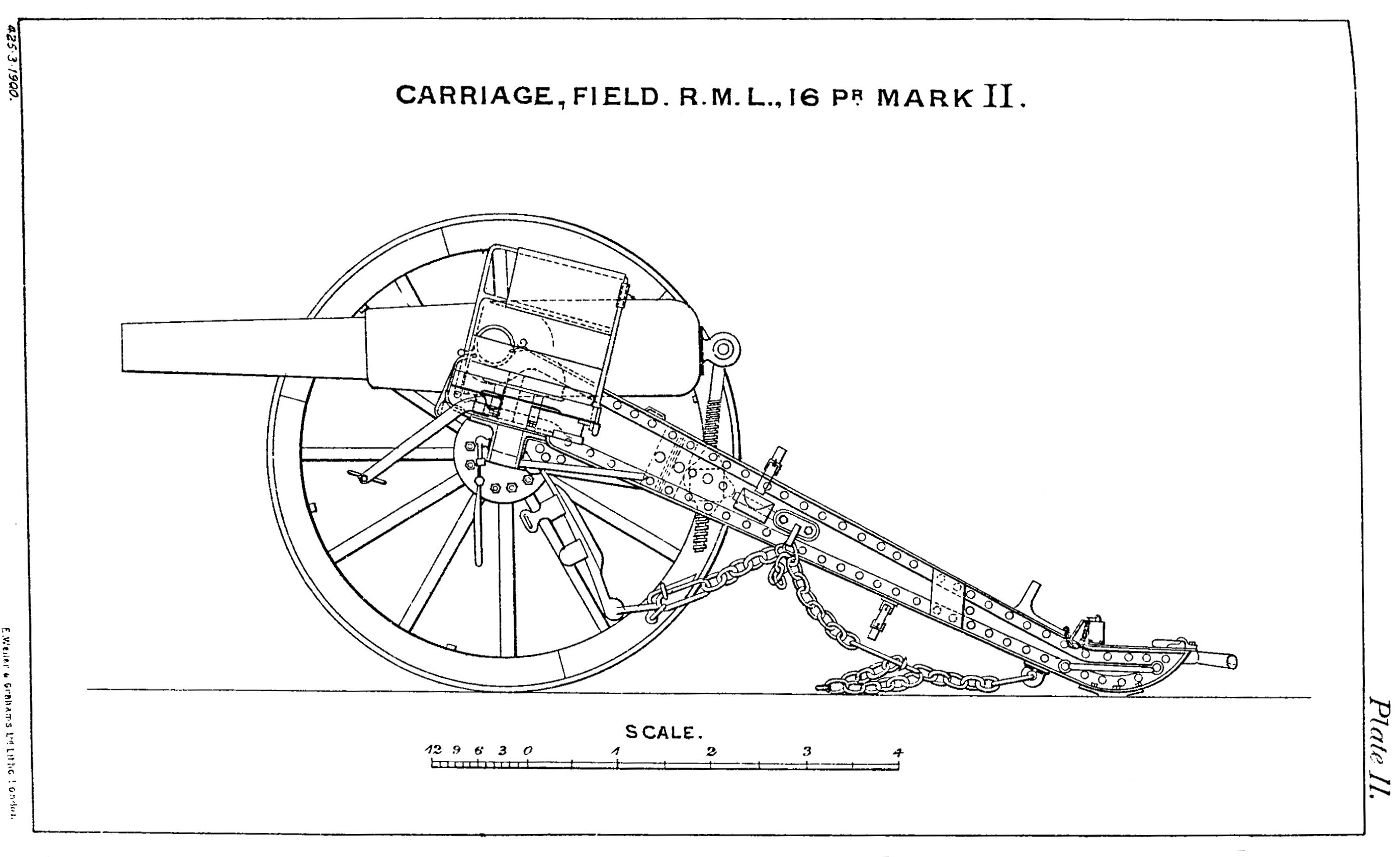
- Gun on Mark II carriage
- Type: Field gun
- Place of origin: United Kingdom

Service history
- In service: 1871–1908
- Used by: British Empire

Production history
- Designer: Woolwich Arsenal
- Manufacturer: Woolwich Arsenal
- Variants: 16 pdr 12 cwt Mark I (Land Service) only

Specifications
- Mass: 12-long-hundredweight (600 kg)
- Crew: 9
- Shell: 16 pounds (7.3 kg) (common shell); 16 pounds (7.3 kg) (shrapnel)
- Calibre: 3.6 inches (91 mm)
- Action: RML
- Breech: none – muzzle-loading
- Muzzle velocity: 1,330 feet per second (405 m/s)
- Effective firing range: 3,500 yards (3,200 m)

The RML 16-pounder 12 cwt gun was a British Rifled, Muzzle Loading (RML) field artillery gun manufactured in England in the 19th century, which fired a projectile weighing approximately 16 pounds (7.3 kg). "12 cwt" refers to the weight of the gun.

== Design and manufacture ==
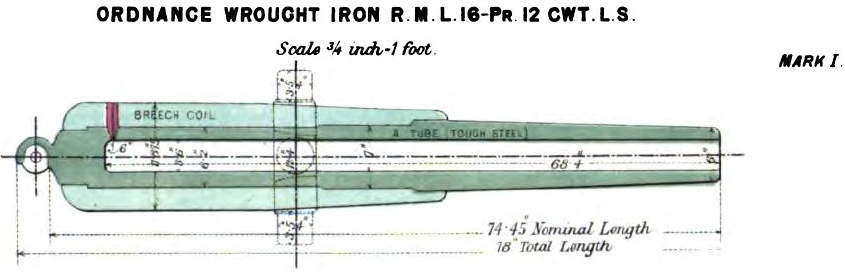
RML 16 pdr 12 cwt gun barrel diagram, 1877

The gun consisted of an 'A' tube of toughened steel, over which was shrunk a 'B' tube of wrought iron. The gun was rifled using the system developed by William Palliser, in which studs protruding from the side of the shell engaged with three spiral grooves in the barrel.

The gun was fitted with a set of side sights on each side of the barrel. This enabled the gun to be sighted for indirect, or direct fire, from either side of the gun. A flat surface was machined on top of the barrel for a clinometer to be used, enabling the gun to be levelled, or to provide an alternate method of indirect sighting.

The gun was designed for land service only, with no naval variants. Two marks of field carriage were produced, which only slightly differed in design.

== Operation ==
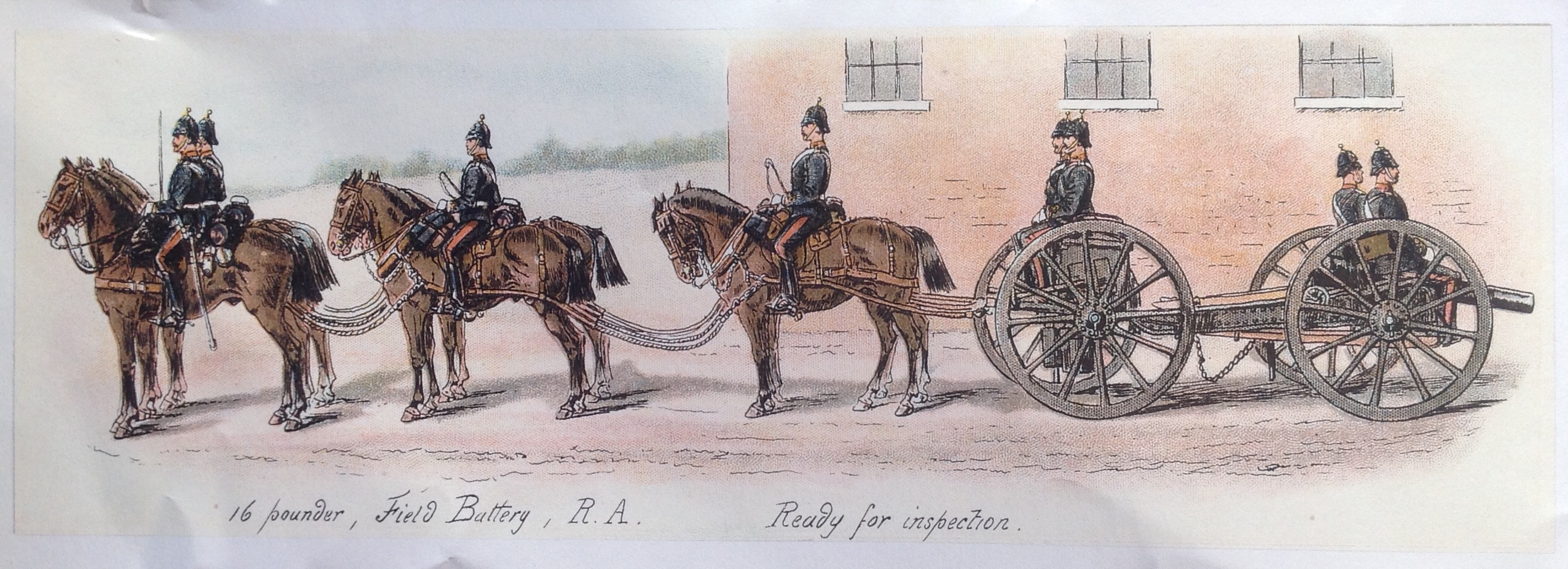
Fully horsed 16-pounder with crew, 1880

The 16-pounder was normally deployed in batteries of six or four guns. Each gun was pulled by a team of six horses. It had a crew of nine men – five crew who could be mounted on seats on the limber and gun, three drivers and a gun commander (number one) mounted separately.

In addition to each gun, a limbered ammunition trailer was also horse drawn. Field Artillery was designed to move at the same speed as infantry, with Horse Artillery being used where greater speed was required.

== Ammunition ==
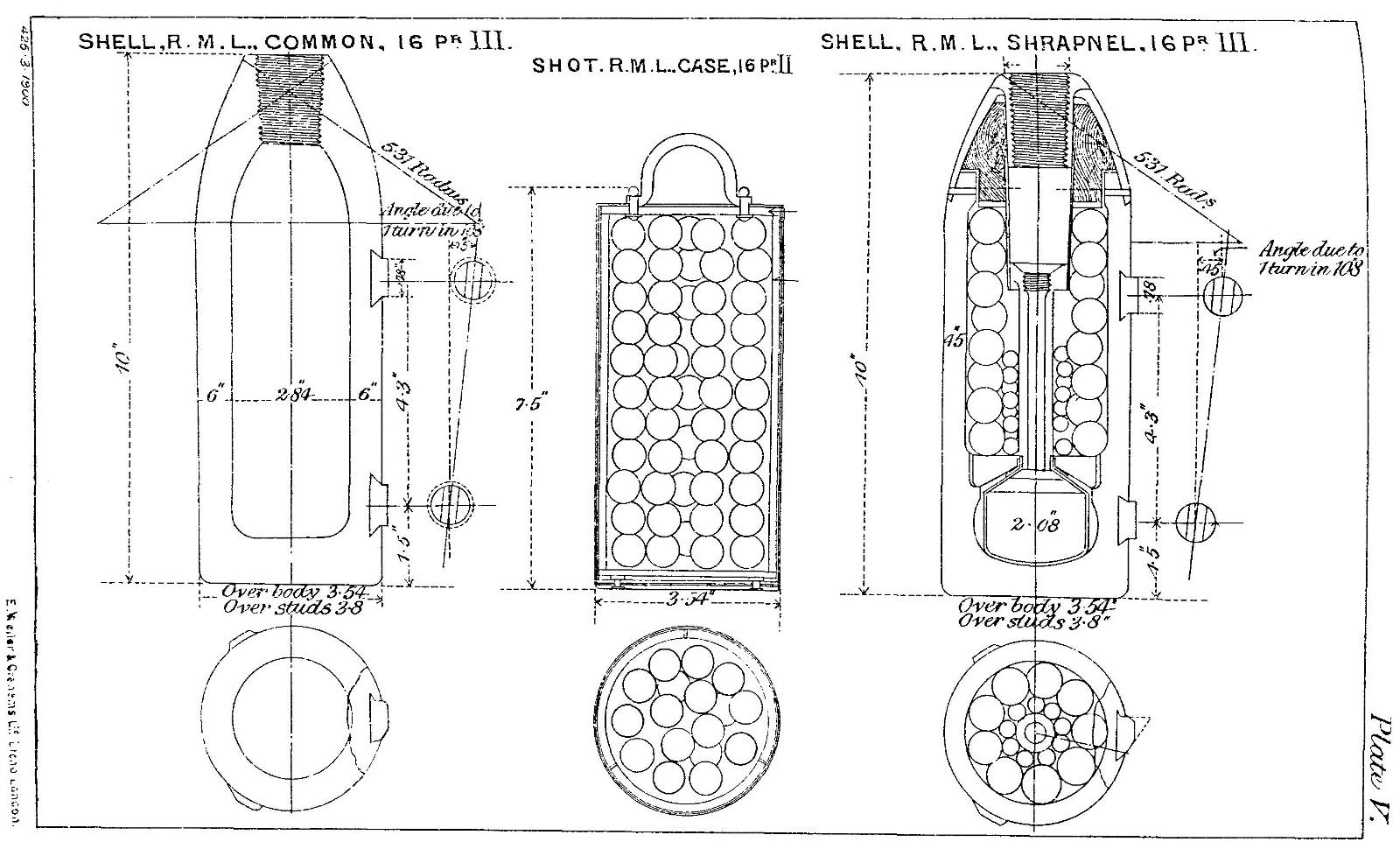
16-pounder RML ammunition diagram

The 16-pounder used three types of ammunition – Common shell (for use against buildings or fortifications), shrapnel shell (for use any Infantry or Cavalry) and case shot (for close range use against 'soft' targets. Ignition was through a copper lined vent at the breech end of the gun. A copper friction tube would be inserted and a lanyard attached. When the lanyard was pulled the tube would ignite, firing the gun. A number of different fuzes could be used enabling shells to either burst at a pre-determined time (and range), or on impact.

Guns were fired using a silk bag containing a black powder propellant. A typical rate of fire was one round per minute.

== Service history ==
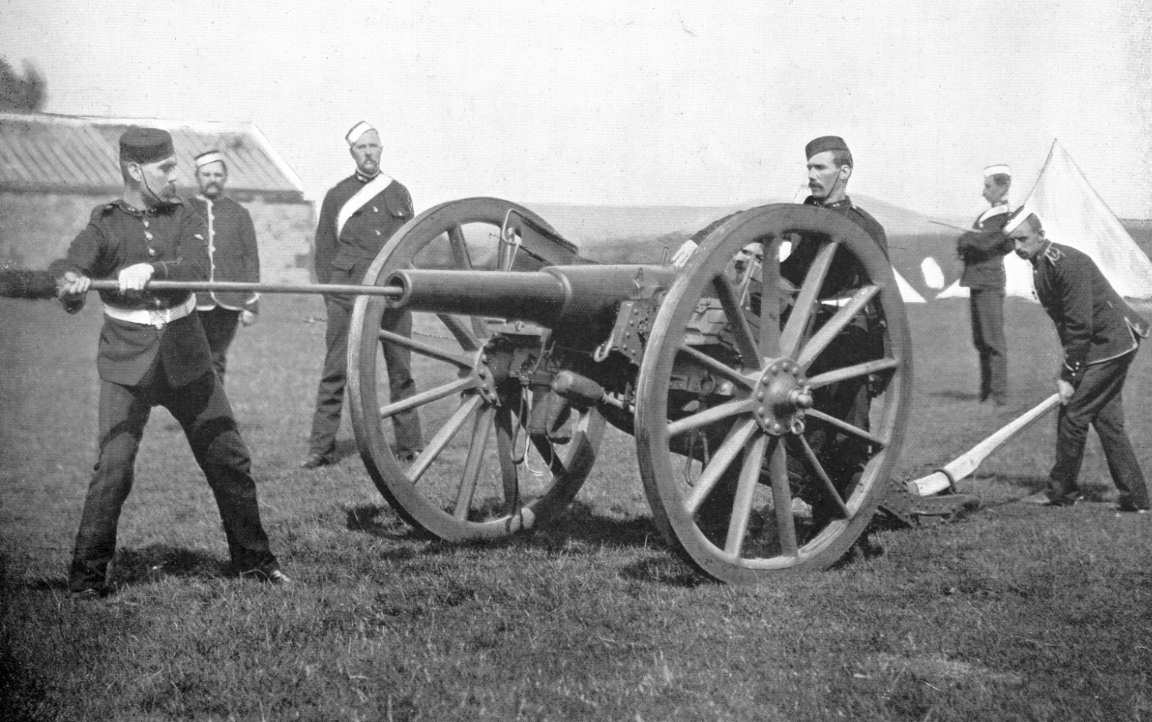
16 pdr RML Shropshire & Staffordshire Volunteer Artillery, 1897

The 16-pounder 12 cwt Rifled Muzzle Loader was the field gun selected by the Royal Artillery in 1871 to replace the more sophisticated RBL 12-pounder 8 cwt Armstrong gun, which had acquired a reputation for unreliability.

The 16-pounder saw action in the Anglo-Zulu War of 1879 and the First Boer War of 1881, as well as the Anglo-Egyptian War of 1882, where four Batteries were deployed. It remained in front-line service with the Royal Artillery until the late 1880s when replaced by the 15-pounder Breech-Loading gun.

Many were re-issued to Volunteer Artillery Batteries of Position from 1889, with 16-pounders among 226 guns issued to the Volunteer Artillery during 1888 and 1889. The 1893 the War Office Mobilisation Scheme shows the allocation of thirty seven Artillery Volunteer position batteries equipped with 16 Pounder guns which would be concentrated in Surrey and Essex in the event of mobilisation. Most remained in use until 1902. In 1906 the 1st Shropshire and Staffordshire Royal Garrison Artillery Volunteers took them to their annual camp in Bare, Morecambe. The last were not finally withdrawn until 1908.

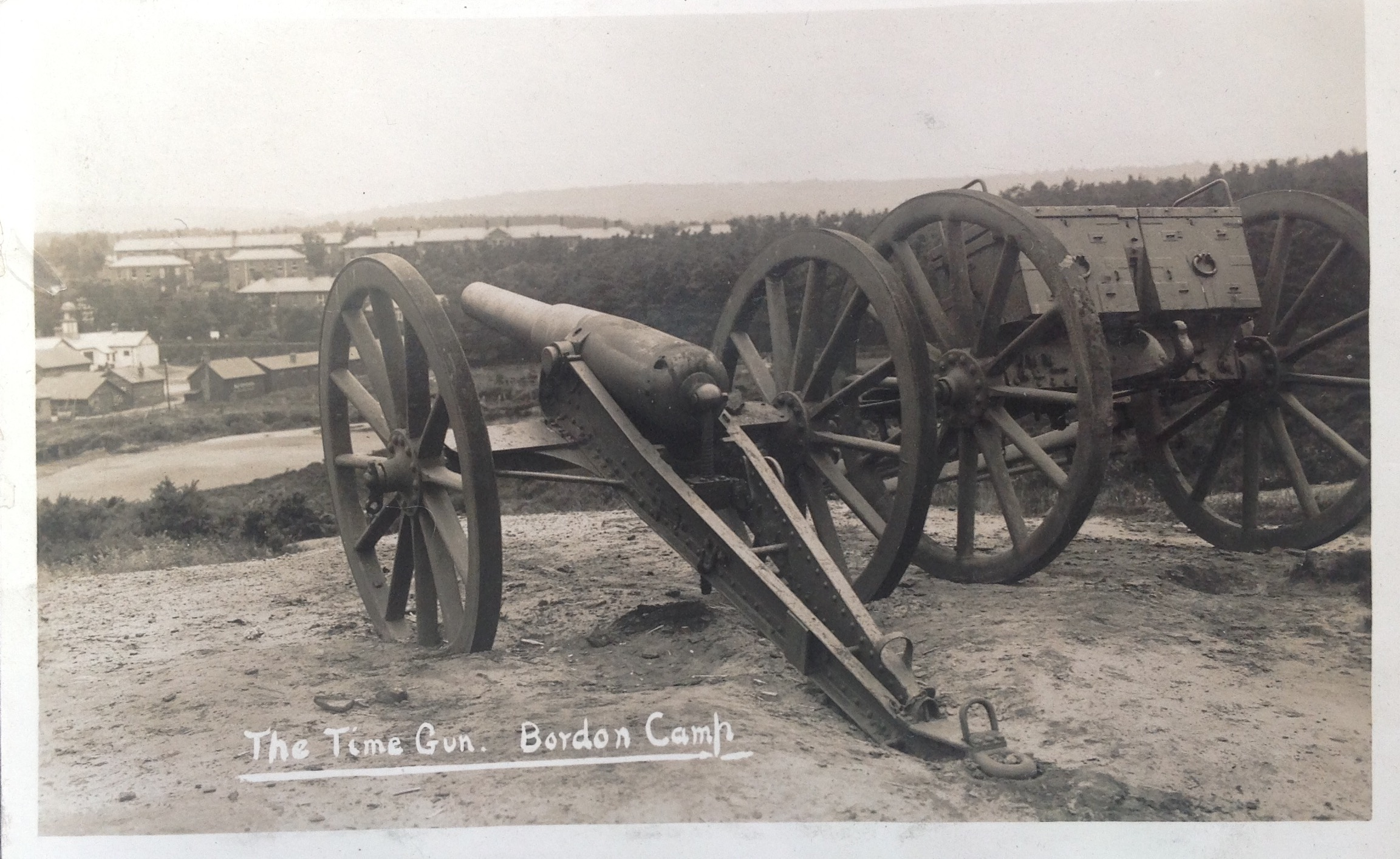
16-pounder RML as time gun, Bordon Camp, c1910

Some guns were issued to different parts of the British Empire. In South Australia eight guns were issued to the South Australian Volunteer Artillery. Six guns were issued for use by the Trinidad Artillery Volunteers in the 1890s and remained in service until at least 1912.

At least one 16 pounder Iron RML of unspecified make was listed in the inventory of the Royal Guard of Hawaii in 1884.

== Surviving examples ==
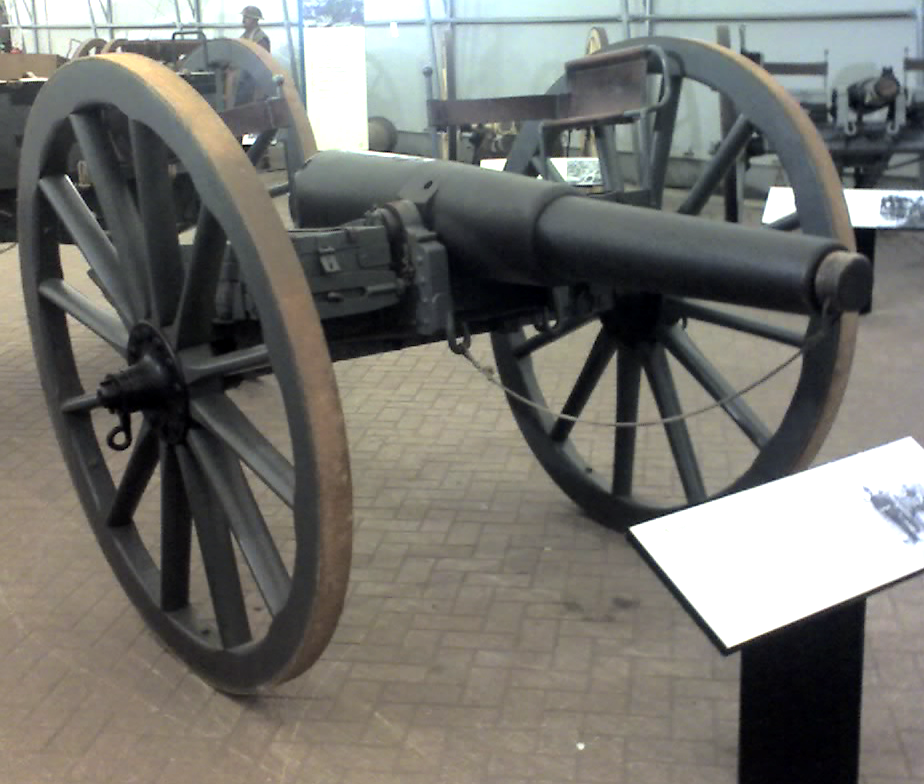
British 16-pounder RML at Fort Nelson

- Serial number 110, dated 1872, with Mark I carriage held by the National Army Museum, United Kingdom
- Serial number 171, dated 1873 at Fort Nelson, Hampshire, Royal Armouries Collection
- Serial number 241, dated 1877, Victoria Barracks, Sydney, New South Wales, Australia
- Serial number 253, dated 1878, War Memorial, Coonooer bridge, Victoria, Australia
- Serial number 285, dated 1878, Fort Glanville Conservation Park, South Australia
- Serial number 288, dated 1878, Army Museum of South Australia, Adelaide, South Australia
- Serial number 289, dated 1879 at Fort Nelson, Hampshire, Royal Armouries Collection
- Fort Brockhurst, Gosport, United Kingdom

== References in Media ==
- The Irish rebel song Come Out, Ye Black and Tans refers to the overwhelming firepower the 16-pounders provided against the Zulu during the Zulu wars in the lyrics: Like the Zulus they had spears and bow and arrows, How bravely you faced each one, With your 16-pounder guns, And you frightened them damn natives to their marrows.

== See also ==
- List of field guns

== Bibliography ==
- Captain John F Owen R.A., "Treatise on the Construction and Manufacture of Ordnance in the British Service", Prepared in the Royal Gun Factory, London, 1877, pages 177-178, 292.
- Text Book of Gunnery, 1902. LONDON : PRINTED FOR HIS MAJESTY'S STATIONERY OFFICE, BY HARRISON AND SONS, ST. MARTIN'S LANE
