= List of battalions of the Durham Light Infantry =

This is a list of battalions of the Durham Light Infantry, which existed as a regiment of the British Army from 1881 to 1968.

== Original composition ==
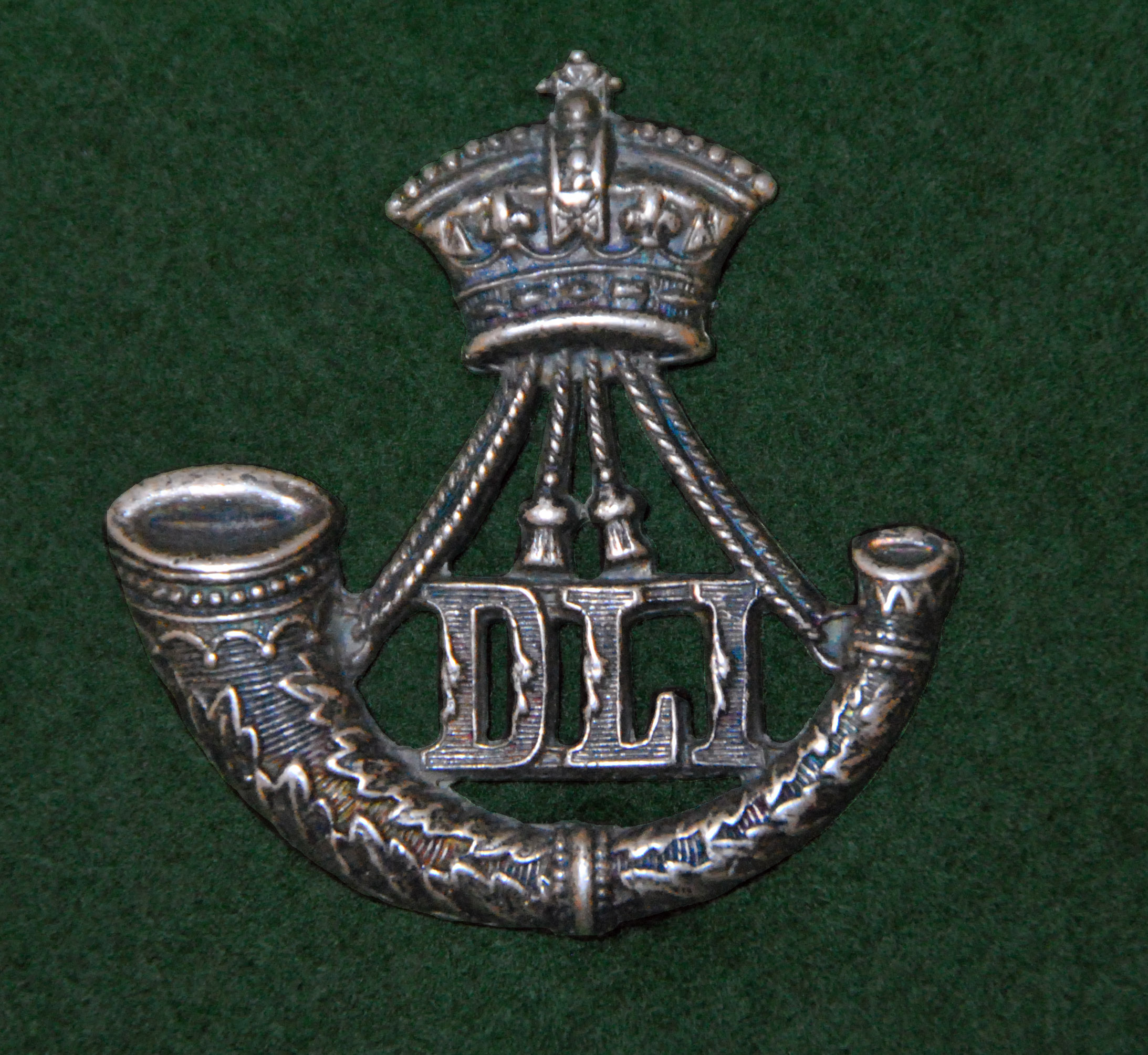
Victoria crown cap badge of the Durham Light Infantry (1881–1902)

When the 68th Regiment of Foot and the 106th Regiment of Foot became the Durham Light Infantry (DLI) in 1881 under the Cardwell-Childers reforms of the British Armed Forces, seven pre-existing militia and volunteer battalions of County Durham were integrated into the structure of the DLI. These latter battalions had existed intermittently for some time, but had been made permanent in reaction to a perceived threat of invasion by France the late 1850s. The militia, in two battalions, were more appealing to the working classes as the equipment was government funded, while the volunteers were organised as "rifle volunteer corps", independent of the British Army, financially self-supporting and composed primarily of the middle class, they underwent a number of reorganisations before reaching the form in which they were incorporated into the county regiment.

Battalion	Formed	Formerly	Depot/Headquarters
Regular
1st	25 August 1756	2/23rd Regiment of Foot, 68th Regiment of Foot (Lambton's Regiment of Foot) (22 April 1758), 68th (Durham) Regiment of Foot (15 August 1782), 68th (Durham) Regiment of Foot (Light Infantry) (late 1808)	Sunderland (since 1873)
2nd	1839	2nd Bombay European Regiment, 2nd Regiment Bombay European Light Infantry (1840), 2nd European Regiment Bombay Light Infantry (14 December 1854), Her Majesty's 2nd Regiment of Bombay European Light Infantry (3 November 1859), 106th Regiment Bombay Light Infantry (30 July 1862)	Sunderland (since 1873)
Militia
3rd (Militia)	1759	1st Durham Fusiliers	Barnard Castle (since 1853)
4th (Militia)	1853	2nd North Durham Militia	Durham (since 1853)
Volunteers
1st Durham Rifle Volunteer Battalion	December 1861	4th Administrative Battalion Durham Rifle Volunteer Corps	Stockton
2nd Durham Rifle Volunteer Battalion	August 1861	2nd Administrative Battalion Durham Rifle Volunteer Corps	Bishop Auckland
3rd (Sunderland) Durham Rifle Volunteer Battalion	February 1861	3rd (The Sunderland) Durham Rifle Volunteer Corps	Sunderland
4th Durham Rifle Volunteer Battalion	August 1861	1st Administrative Battalion Durham Rifle Volunteer Corps	Chester-le-Street
5th Durham Rifle Volunteer Battalion	August 1861	3rd Administrative Battalion Durham Rifle Volunteer Corps	Gateshead

In December 1887 the Durham Rifle Volunteer Battalions were renamed as Volunteer Battalions of the Durham Light Infantry retaining their Administrative battalion numbers. The 3rd Corps sub-title was granted in 1867, with the slight change officially registered in 1887.

== Reorganisation ==
The Territorial Force (renamed the Territorial Army in 1920) was formed in 1908, from the volunteer infantry battalions of the county regiments, and other volunteer arms. The militia battalions transferred to the "Reserve" or the "Special Reserve". The 3rd and 4th battalions exchanged numbers that year, and were recast as the 3rd (Reserve) and 4th (Extra Reserve) battalions in a draft finding role. The reason for this apparently pointless exchange of numbers was that in the event of a mobilisation the War Office intended to use the 3rd battalion of a regiment to provide reinforcements for the regular battalions, while if a regiment had a 4th battalion it would be mobilised as a whole unit. The older unit (1st Durham Fusiliers, then the 3rd battalion) wished to remain as a fighting unit, and so exchanged numbers. All volunteer battalions were renumbered to create a single numerical sequence.

Battalion	Formerly
3rd (Reserve)	4th (Militia)
4th (Extra Reserve)	3rd (Militia)
5th	1st Volunteer Battalion
6th	2nd Volunteer Battalion
7th	3rd Volunteer Battalion
8th	4th Volunteer Battalion
9th	5th Volunteer Battalion

== First World War ==
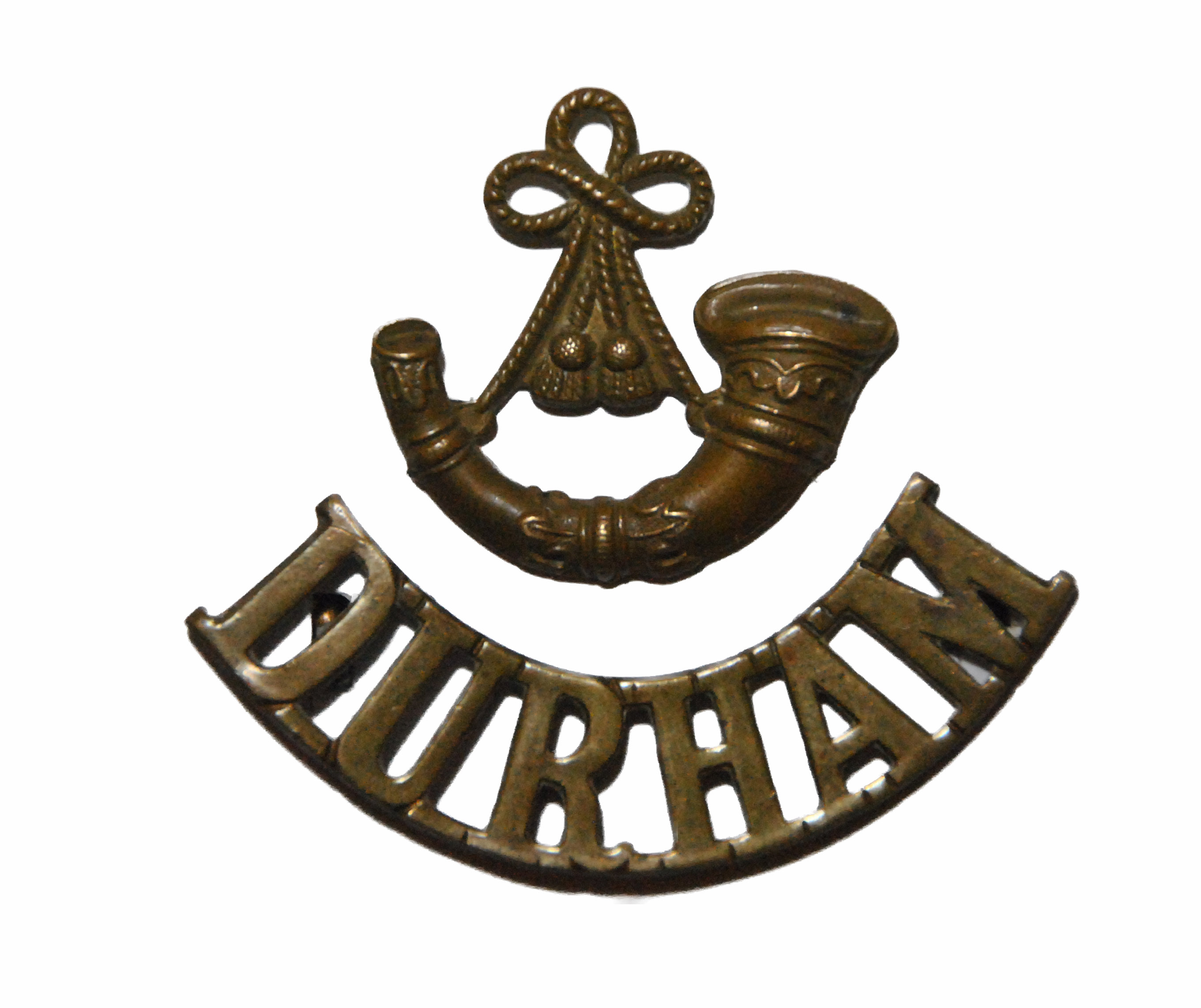
Brass shoulder title as used by regulars and service battalions in the First World War

The Durham Light Infantry would send 22 battalions overseas and lose 12006 other ranks during the course of the war. The regiment's territorial components formed duplicate second and third line battalions of progressively lower fitness men. Many new battalions, technically of the Regular Army, were formed as part of Secretary of State for War Lord Kitchener's appeal for an initial 100,000 men volunteers in August 1914, referred to as the New Army or Kitchener's Army. The 18th and 20th Service battalions, were referred to as "Pals" because they were predominantly composed of colleagues, the 19th battalion was originally a Bantam battalion. The Volunteer Training Corps were raised with overage or reserved occupation men early in the war, and were initially self-organised into many small corps, with a wide variety of names, such as the Darlington Civilian Rifle Club, formed on 12 September 1914 which had amembership of 260 by December that year. Recognition of the corps by the authorities brought regulation and as the war continued the small corps were formed into battalion sized units of the county Volunteer Regiment. In 1918 these were linked to county regiments.

Battalion	Date Formed	Service	Fate	Notes
Regular
1st	22 April 1756	India (NWF), Afghanistan		One of eight out of the 52 regular Army infantry battalions ordered to stay in India.
2nd	1839	Western Front, Army of Occupation		Attached to 18th Brigade, 6th Division throughout the war. Battle patch, a shield in regimental colours painted on the helmet from August 1918.
Reserve and Special Reserve
3rd (Reserve)	1853	Britain		Not embodied, used as a source of replacements for the Regular battalions.
4th (Extra Reserve)	1759	Britain		Used as a source of replacements for the Regular battalions.
Territorial Force
1/5th	1861	Western Front	Reduced to cadre strength 15 June 1918	Attached to 150th (York and Durham) Brigade, 50th (Northumbrian) Division until February 1918, then with 151st (Durham Light Infantry) Brigade. Battle-patch, a slate blue square on the upper arm.
1/6th	1861	Western Front	Reduced to cadre strength 15 June 1918	Attached to 151st (Durham Light Infantry) Brigade, 50th (Northumbrian) Division until June 1918. Battle-patch, a red diamond on the upper arm, and helmet.
1/7th	1861	Western Front.	Demobilised June 1919	Attached to 151st (Durham Light Infantry) Brigade, 50th (Northumbrian) Division until it became the division's pioneer battalion in May 1915. Transferred to 8th Division and absorbed the 22nd Battalion 23 June 1918
1/8th	1861	Western Front	Reduced to cadre strength 15 June 1918	Attached to 151st (Durham Light Infantry) Brigade, 50th (Northumbrian) Division until June 1918. Battle-patch, a slate blue coloured diamond on the upper arm.
1/9th	1861	Western Front, Army of Occupation.		Attached to 151st (Durham Light Infantry) Brigade, 50th (Northumbrian) Division until it became the pioneer battalion for the 62nd (2nd West Riding) Division in February 1918. Battle-patch (while in 50th Div), a green diamond on the upper arm.
2/5th	Stockton and Darlington, September 1914	Britain, Salonika.	Disbanded October 1919	Part of 189th (2nd York and Durham) Brigade, 63rd (2nd Northumbrian) Division until July 1916. Transferred to 228th Brigade, 28th Division when in Salonika.
2/6th	Gateshead, 26 September 1914	Britain, Western Front	Disbanded post war	Part of 190th (2nd Durham Light Infantry) Brigade, 63rd (2nd Northumbrian) Division until July 1916. Went to France with the 177th Brigade, 59th (2nd North Midland) Division in May 1918.
2/7th	Sunderland, 16 September 1914	Britain, Russia	Disbanded 1919	Part of 190th (2nd Durham Light Infantry) Brigade, 63rd (2nd Northumbrian) Division until July 1916. North Russia Intervention 1918–19
2/8th	Durham, October 1914	Britain	Disbanded December 1917	Part of 190th (2nd Durham Light Infantry) Brigade, 63rd (2nd Northumbrian) Division until July 1916.
2/9th	Gateshead, 11 September 1914	Britain, Salonika	Disbanded January 1920	Part of 190th (2nd Durham Light Infantry) Brigade, 63rd (2nd Northumbrian) Division. Part of the Army Troops in Salonika.
3/5th	April 1915	Britain	Disbanded post-war	Re-designated as 5th (Reserve) Battalion on 8 April 1916; absorbed 3/6th, 3/7th, 3/8th and 3/9th battalions on 1 September 1916
3/6th	April 1915	Britain	Absorbed into 5th (Reserve) Battalion on 1 September 1916	Redesignated as 6th (Reserve) Battalion on 8 April 1916
3/7th	April 1915	Britain	Absorbed into 5th (Reserve) Battalion on 1 September 1916	Redesignated as 7th (Reserve) Battalion on 8 April 1916
3/8th	April 1915	Britain	Absorbed into 5th (Reserve) Battalion on 1 September 1916	Redesignated as 8th (Reserve) Battalion on 8 April 1916
3/9th	April 1915	Britain	Absorbed into 5th (Reserve) Battalion on 1 September 1916	Redesignated as 9th (Reserve) Battalion on 8 April 1916
26th	Clacton, 1 January 1917 by redesignation of 23rd Provisional Battalion, T.F.	Britain	Disbanded post-war	23rd Provisional Battalion, T.F. was formed in 1915 by Home Service personnel of 6th, 7th, 8th and 9th DLI T.F. battalions
27th	St. Osyth, 1 January 1917 by redesignation of 25th Provisional Battalion, T.F.	Britain	Disbanded post-war	25th Provisional Battalion, T.F. was formed in 1915 by Home Service personnel of 5th DLI and 4th East Yorkshire T.F. battalions.
New Army
10th (Service)	September 1914	Western Front	Disbanded in February 1918 as part of the Army reorganisation, reinforcing other D.L.I battalions.	Part of 43rd Brigade, 14th (Light) Division until disbanded. Nicknamed "The Shiny Tenth". Battle-patch, a silhouette of a regimental cap badge in red.
11th (Service)	September 1914	Western Front	Disbanded post war	Part of 60th Brigade, 20th (Light) Division until converted into the division's pioneer battalion in January 1915.
12th (Service)	September 1914	Western Front, Italy	Disbanded post war	Part of the 68th Brigade, 23rd Division throughout the war. Battle-patch, a green rectangle with a central red horizontal stripe and a central green circle, worn on the sleeve.
13th (Service)	September 1914	Western Front, Italy	Disbanded post war	Part of the 68th Brigade, 23rd Division until September 1918 when it returned to the Western Front from Italy with the 74th Brigade, 25th Division. Battle-patch (while in 23rd Div), a diamond divided into red and green triangular halves, orientation showed company, worn on the sleeve.
14th (Service)	September 1914	Western Front	Disbanded February 1918 as part of the Army reorganisation, reinforcing other D.L.I battalions.	Part of the 64th Brigade, 21st Division until September 1915 then joined the 2nd Battalion in 18th Brigade, 6th Infantry Division until disbandment. Battle patch (while in the 6th Division) a dark green triangle.
15th (Service)	September 1914	Western Front	Disbanded post war	Part of the 64th Brigade, 21st Division throughout the war. Battle-patch, a green inverted triangle on the sleeve and back collar, from 1918 a yellow bugle replaced the square on the back collar.
16th (Reserve)	October 1914	Britain	Became 1st Training Reserve Battalion in 1st Reserve Brigade, September 1916.	
17th (Reserve)	Barnard Castle October 1914	Britain	Became 2nd Training Reserve Battalion in 1st Reserve Brigade, September 1916	Returned to the regiment as the 53rd (Young Soldiers) Battalion.
18th (Service) (1st County)	24 September 1914	Suez, Western Front	Disbanded post war	A Pals battalion. Part of the 93rd Brigade, 31st Division throughout the war. Battle-patch, a red horizontal rectangle on a green rectangle on the sleeve, brigade patch a white and red square divided diagonally on the back.
19th (Service) (2nd County)	West Hartlepool, 3 March 1915	Western Front	Disbanded post war	A Bantam battalion. Part of the 106th Brigade, 35th Division, moving to the 104th Brigade in February 1918. It ceased to be a Bantam unit in January 1917. Battle patch, the cap badge stencilled in white on the front of the helmet.
20th (Service) (Wearside)	Sunderland June 1915	Western Front, Italy, Army of Occupation	Disbanded post war	A Pals battalion. Part of the 123rd Brigade, 41st Division, moving to the 124th Brigade in March 1918. Battle-patch, a red inverted triangle under an upper segment of an annulus.
21st (Reserve)	Cocken Hall 29 July 1915	Britain	Disbanded post war	Formed as local reserve battalion from depot companies of 18th and 20th Battalions. Became 87th Training Reserve Battalion in 20th Reserve Brigade, September 1916
22nd (Service) (3rd County Pioneers)	1 October 1915	Western Front	Merged with 1/7th pioneer Battalion (50th (Northumbrian) Division) 23 June 1918	A Pals battalion; 3rd County Battalion. Arrived in France unbrigaded with the 19th (Western) Division in July 1915, then attached to 8th Division as divisional pioneers until June 1918. Battle patch, two circles, red and green side by side.
23rd (Reserve)	Catterick, October 1915	Britain	Absorbed in Reserve Battalions of 20th Reserve Brigade on 1 September 191 at Hornsea	Formed as local reserve battalion from depot companies of 19th Battalion
29th (Service)	Brookwood, Surrey, 19 June 1918	Western Front	Disbanded post war	Formed from a cadre of the 2/7th Battalion Duke of Wellington's Regiment, and included drafts from the 26th and 27th Battalions. Part of 41st Brigade, 14th (Light) Division from July 1918.
Others
25th (Works)	May 1916	Britain	Disbanded post war	Part of Northern Command.
28th (Home Service)	April 1918	Britain	Disbanded post war	
51st (Graduated)	October 1917	Army of Occupation 1919	Disbanded post war	Originally the 11th (Reserve) Battalion, North Staffordshire Regiment, before becoming the 4th Training Reserve Battalion, and then the 258th Battalion in 215th Brigade of the 72nd (Home Service) Division; became a service battalion in 1919
52nd (Graduated)	October 1917	Army of Occupation 1919	Disbanded post war	Originally the 31st (Reserve) Battalion of the Northumberland Fusiliers, before becoming the 86th Training Reserve Battalion, and then the 273rd Battalion, of the 220th Brigade of the 73rd (Home Service) Division.
53rd (Young Soldier)	October 1917	Army of Occupation 1919	Disbanded post war	It was previously the 17th (Service) Battalion of the D.L.I.

Volunteer Corps of the Durham Volunteer Regiment
Battalion	Location	Fate	
1st Battalion Durham Volunteer Regiment formed 9 August 1916, became the 1st Volunteer Battalion Durham Light Infantry	Gateshead	Disbanded post war	By August 1918 it had a strength of 256 officers and 10,408 N.C.O.s and men.
2nd Battalion Durham Volunteer Regiment formed 9 August 1916, became the 2nd Volunteer Battalion Durham Light Infantry	Sunderland	Disbanded post war	By August 1918 it had a strength of 256 officers and 10,408 N.C.O.s and men.
3rd Battalion Durham Volunteer Regiment formed 9 August 1916, became the 3rd Volunteer Battalion Durham Light Infantry	Bishop Auckland	Disbanded post war	By August 1918 it had a strength of 256 officers and 10,408 N.C.O.s and men.
4th Battalion Durham Volunteer Regiment formed 9 August 1916, became the 4th Volunteer Battalion Durham Light Infantry	Darlington	Disbanded post war	By August 1918 it had a strength of 256 officers and 10,408 N.C.O.s and men.
5th Battalion Durham Volunteer Regiment formed December 1916, became the 5th Volunteer Battalion Durham Light Infantry	Stockton	Disbanded post war	By August 1918 it had a strength of 256 officers and 10,408 N.C.O.s and men.
6th Battalion Durham Volunteer Regiment formed December 1916, became the 6th Volunteer Battalion Durham Light Infantry	Hartlepool	Disbanded post war	By August 1918 it had a strength of 256 officers and 10,408 N.C.O.s and men.
7th Battalion Durham Volunteer Regiment formed March 1917, became the 7th Volunteer Battalion Durham Light Infantry	Sunderland	Disbanded post war	By August 1918 it had a strength of 256 officers and 10,408 N.C.O.s and men.
8th Battalion Durham Volunteer Regiment, formed March 1917	Houghton le Spring	Disbanded between February and August 1918	By August 1918 it had a strength of 256 officers and 10,408 N.C.O.s and men.
9th Battalion Durham Volunteer Regiment formed August 1918, became the 9th Volunteer Battalion Durham Light Infantry	Birtley	Disbanded post war	By August 1918 it had a strength of 256 officers and 10,408 N.C.O.s and men.
10th Battalion Durham Volunteer Regiment formed August 1918, became the 10th Volunteer Battalion Durham Light Infantry	West Hartlepool	Disbanded post war	By August 1918 it had a strength of 256 officers and 10,408 N.C.O.s and men.
11th Battalion Durham Volunteer Regiment formed August 1918, became the 11th Volunteer Battalion Durham Light Infantry	Sunderland	Disbanded post war	By August 1918 it had a strength of 256 officers and 10,408 N.C.O.s and men.
12th Battalion Durham Volunteer Regiment formed August 1918, became the 8th Volunteer Battalion Durham Light Infantry	Houghton le Spring	Disbanded post war	By August 1918 it had a strength of 256 officers and 10,408 N.C.O.s and men.

== Inter-War ==
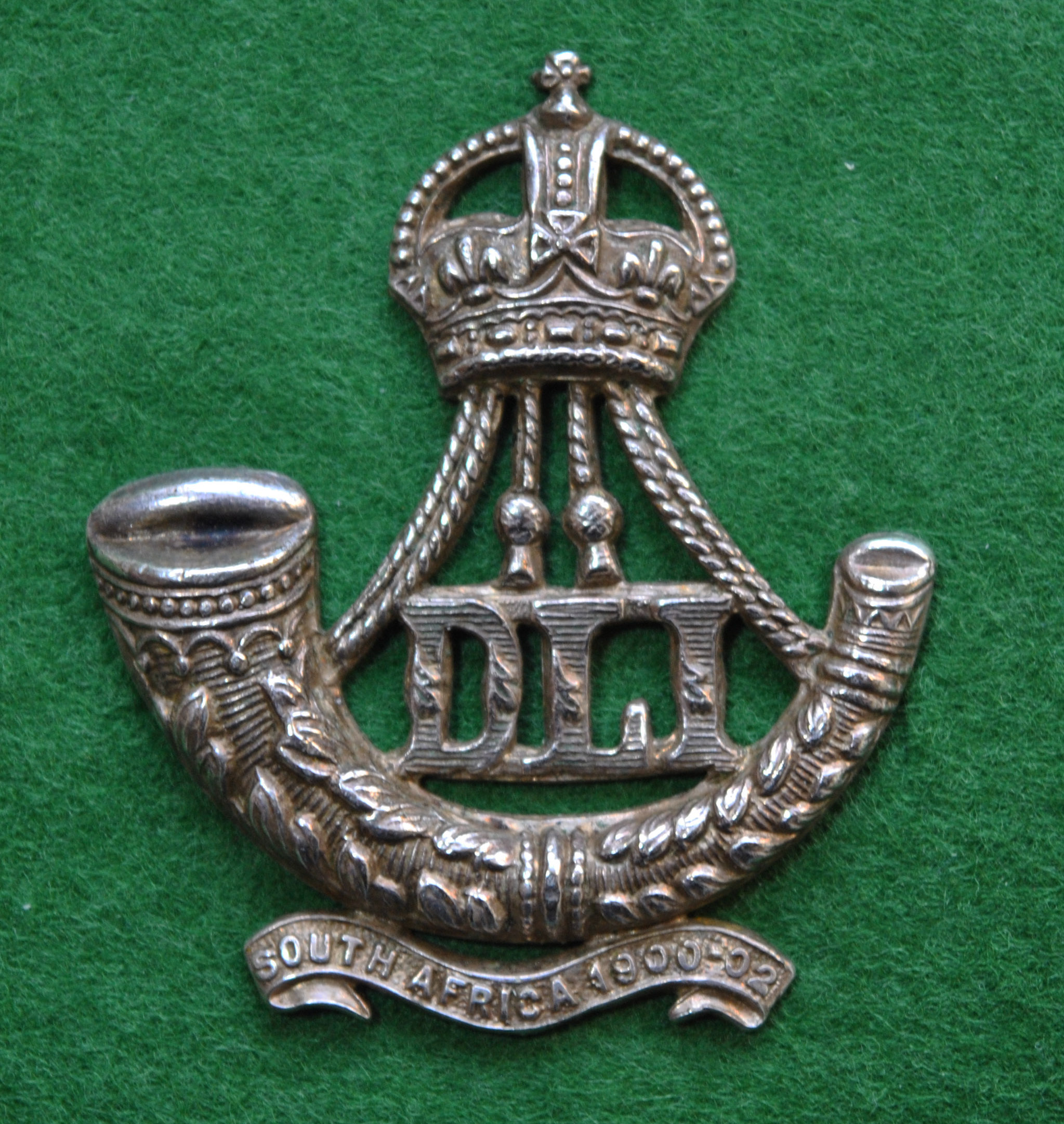
King's Crown cap badge with the 'South Africa 1900-02' battle-honour, worn by Durham Light Infantry territorial battalions from 1909 to 1953

By late 1920, all of the regiment's war-raised battalions had disbanded, with many of their Colours laid up in Durham Cathedral. Territorial Force battalions were reformed in 1921, renamed the Territorial Army later in the year.

Battalion	Date Formed/Reformed	Service	Fate	Notes
Regular
1st	22 April 1756	Germany, Egypt, Britain, China		
2nd	1839	Russia, Turkey, India, China, Britain		
Reserve and Special Reserve
3rd (Reserve)	Not reformed			
4th (Extra Reserve)	Not reformed			
Territorial Army
5th	Reformed 1920		Transferred to the Royal Engineers in 1938 and converted into a searchlight (S/L) battalion, becoming Royal Artillery in August 1940.	Split in 1938, forming the 1/5th and 2/5th battalions, became respectively the 54th and 55th (D.L.I.) Searchlight Regiments, the 54th with an attached ATS company. The 55th (S/L) Regiment became the 113th (D.L.I.) Light Anti-Aircraft Regiment in January 1942. Both regiments deployed to North West Europe in 1944 as part of 21st Army Group. The 113th L.A.A. Regiment would help liberate Bergen-Belsen and aid the survivors. The 113th L.A.A. regiment ended the War around Hanover, the 54th (S/L) Regiment ended the War in Antwerp.
6th	Reformed 1920			
7th	Reformed 1920		Transferred to the Royal Engineers in 1936 and converted into a searchlight (S/L) battalion, becoming Royal Artillery in August 1940.	Initially the 47th (D.L.I.) A.A. Battalion R.E. (T.A.), on joining the Royal Artillery it became the 47th (D.L.I.) S/L Regiment R.A. (T.A.). In January 1942 it was renamed the 112th (D.L.I.) L.A.A. Regiment R.A. (T.A.), and deployed to North West Europe in 1944 as part of XII Corps, with one battery converting to use the Land Mattress in March 1945. It ended the War in Hamburg
8th	Reformed 1920			
9th	Reformed 1920			

== Second World War ==
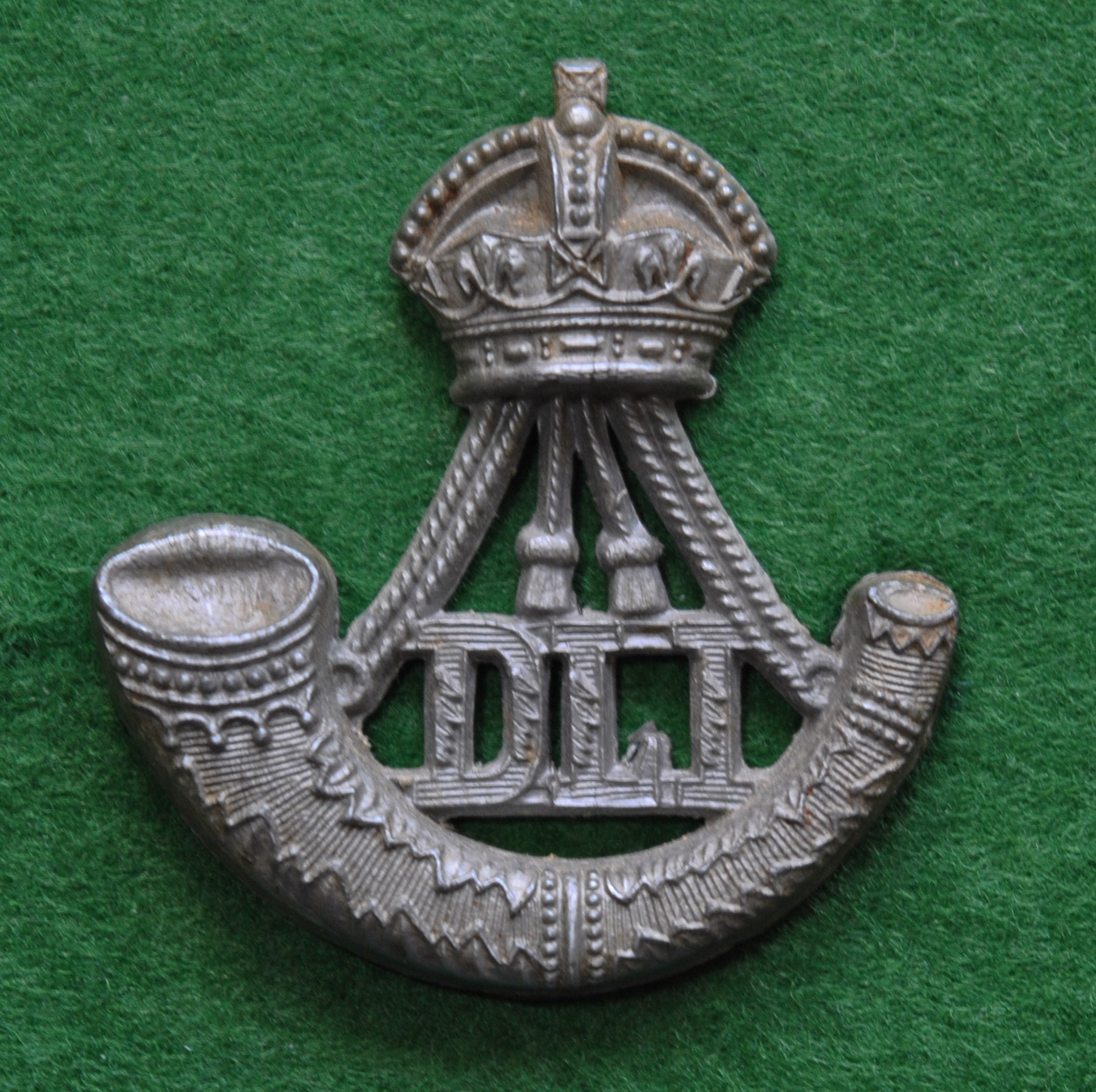
Second World War King's crown cap badge, worn by all battalions of the Durham Light Infantry (plastic, economy version 1942–1945)

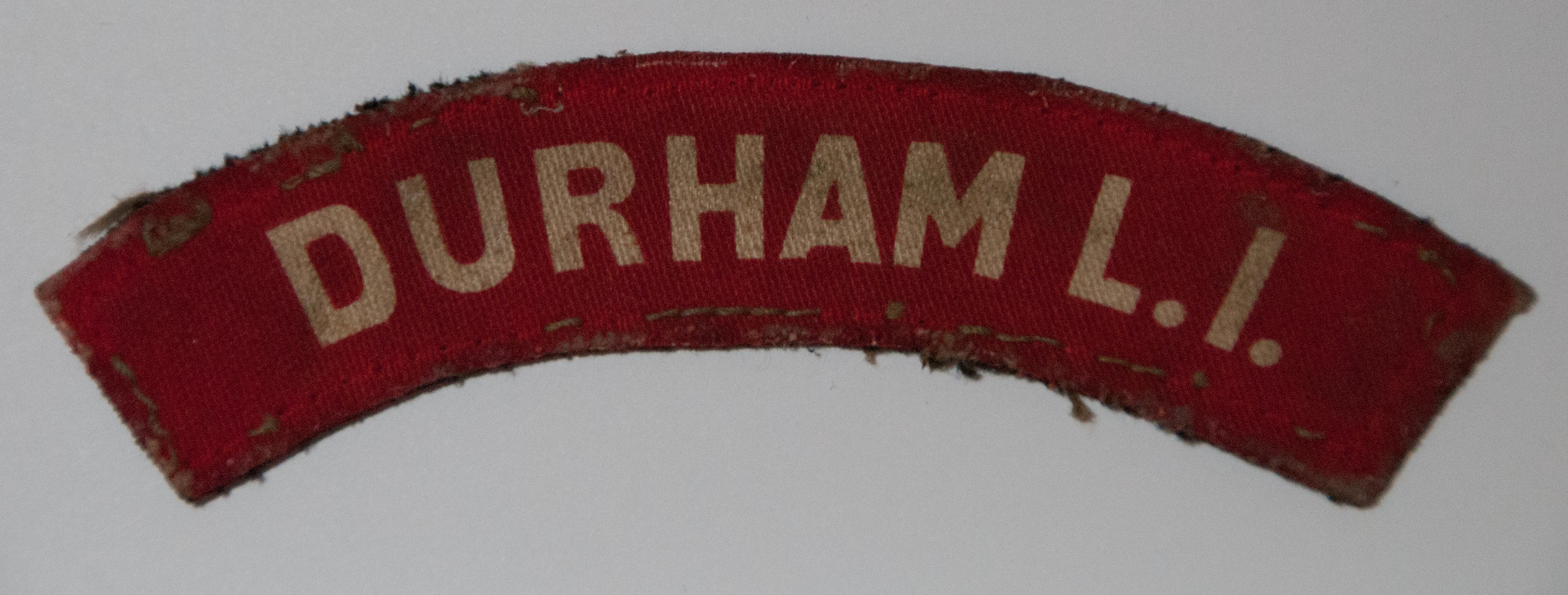
Second World War shoulder title of the Durham Light Infantry (printed, economy version)

The regiment's expansion during the Second World War was modest compared to 1914–18. Existing territorial battalions formed duplicates as in WWI (using whole rather than fractional numbers), while National Defence Companies were used to create a new "Home Defence" battalion. Hostilities-only battalions were raised after the evacuation of Dunkirk. In addition to this, 26 battalions of the Home Guard were affiliated to the regiment, wearing its cap badge, and also by 1944 one Heavy Anti Aircraft (HAA) battery, and four rocket batteries (Z Battery). Due to the daytime (or shift working) occupations of these men, the batteries required eight times the manpower of an equivalent regular battery. A number of Light Anti-Aircraft (LAA) troops were formed from the local battalions to defend specific points, such as factories.

Battalion	Date formed/Reformed	Served	Fate	Notes
Regular
1st	25 August 1756	North Africa, Syria, Mediterranean, Italy		Part of (in order) the 22nd Infantry Brigade, 22nd Guards Brigade (with 6th Indian Infantry Division a short while), 23rd Infantry Brigade, (itself variously under British Troops in Egypt, 4th and 6th Indian Infantry Divisions, I Corps (Australia) and 70th Division while the battalion was with it), 233rd and 234th Brigades in Malta Command, Middle East Command, and finally 10th Indian Infantry Brigade of the 10th Indian Infantry Division. Ended the War near Ferrara, Italy.
2nd	1839	France, Burma		Part of 6th Brigade, 2nd Infantry Division throughout the War. Ended the War in Rangoon, Burma.
Supplementary Reserve
3rd	Not Reformed			
4th	Not reformed			
Territorial Army
6th	1861	France, Britain, Syria, Iraq, North Africa, Sicily, North West Europe	Reduced to training cadre December 1944 and returned to the UK.	Spent the war with 151st Brigade, 50th (Northumbrian) Infantry Division. Distinguishing marks: Blackened cap badge on a red square. "Semi-official" shoulder title colours of red letters on a green background. A 'Blue Durham flash' on the shoulder.
8th	1861	France, Britain, Syria, Iraq, North Africa, Sicily, North West Europe	Reduced to training cadre December 1944 and returned to the UK. Disbanded 16 January 1946 at Harrogate.	Spent the war with 151st Brigade, 50th (Northumbrian) Infantry Division. Distinguishing mark: Cap badge on a dark green circle. A 'Blue Durham flash' on the shoulder.
9th	1861	France, Britain, Syria, Iraq, North Africa, Sicily, North West Europe	Disbanded 16 October 1946 in Germany at Hemer.	Spent the war with 151st Brigade, 50th (Northumbrian) Infantry Division until transferred to 131st Brigade of the 7th Armoured Division in December 1944. Ended the War in Hamburg. Distinguishing mark: a 'Blue Durham flash' on the shoulder while with 151st Brigade.
10th	September 1939	France, Britain, Iceland, North West Europe	Disbanded September 1944.	2nd line territorial of the 6th battalion. Spent the War with 70th Brigade, first with 23rd (Northumbrian) Division until June 1940, then 49th (West Riding) Infantry Division. Disbanded (as a junior, 2nd line unit) to maintain the fighting strength of other infantry battalions in the Second Army.
11th	September 1939	France, Britain, Iceland, North West Europe.	Disbanded September 1944	2nd line territorial of the 8th battalion. History same as the 10th.
12th	September 1939	France, Britain, Iceland, North West Europe	Renamed the 1st Battalion, Tyneside Scottish of the Black Watch (Royal Highland Regiment) in January 1940.	2nd line territorial of the 9th battalion. Wore a green lanyard signalling its DLI origin
Hostilities only
1/13th (Home Defence)	December 1939 from No 41 National Defence Company	Britain	Disbanded November 1941 by renumbering as 30th DLI	
2/13th (Home Defence)	September 1940 from 13th Battalion	Britain	Disbanded December 1940 by renumbering as 18th DLI (1)	
14th	June 1940	Britain	Disbanded 1945	Brigaded in the 206th Independent Infantry Brigade with the 16th and 17th battalions until September 1942, at times part of Scottish Command, 44th (Home Counties) Infantry Division, 56th (London) Infantry Division and 46th Infantry Division it transferred to the 209th Independent Infantry Brigade as part of the 77th Infantry Division where its role changed in September 1943 to being reception centre for returning PoWs and convalescents. It ended the war in this role in Durham City in the 134th Infantry Brigade
15th	October 1940 from 50th (Holding) battalion	Britain	Converted into the 155th Regiment Royal Armoured Corps in November 1941.	From March to November 1941 it was part of 217th Independent Infantry Brigade (Home) of the Durham and North Riding County Division. As the 155th Regiment it was assigned to 35th Army Tank Brigade, 79th Armoured Division it was trained and equipped with Churchills, Rams Shermans and then Canal Defence Light tanks. It left that division when designated as a training unit in April 1944. It was disbanded in May 1945.
16th	June 1940	Britain, North Africa, Italy, Greece	Disbanded January–February 1946 in Vienna	Brigaded in the 206th Independent Infantry Brigade with the 14th and 17th battalions until December 1940, then spent the rest of the war with 139th Infantry Brigade, 46th Infantry Division. Distinguishing mark: Cap badge on a dark square background
17th	June 1940 at Shrewsbury	Britain	Disbanded September 1943	Brigaded in the 206th Independent Infantry Brigade until September In September 1942 the battalion became part of 164th Infantry Brigade of the 55th (West Lancashire) Infantry Division until September 1943. The battalion had provided ~1900 trained officers and other ranks as replacements by the time of its disbandment.
18th (1)	December 1940 formed from the 2/13th battalion.	Britain	Disbanded November 1941 by renumbering as 30th DLI.	
18th (2)	March 1943, Geneifa, Egypt	Italy, France	Disbanded August 1945, Calais.	Formed the infantry component of a Beach Brick supporting amphibious landings. Served under Middle East Command, the U.S. Fifth Army, Second British Army, and 21st Army Group lines of communications.
30th (Home Defence)	November 1941 by the merger of 1/13th and 18th (1) battalions	Britain	Disbanded November 1942	Gradually exchanged cat 'B' fitness men for 'A1' and became field force battalion from June 1942
70th (Young Soldiers)	December 1940	Britain	Disbanded August 1943, Tow Law	Served as demonstration battalion for G.H.Q. Battle School. Over 400 officers and men sent overseas, intended for the 151st Brigade, over 150 however reached the 16th Battalion D.L.I. and the 6th Battalion, Lincolnshire Regiment of the 138th Brigade, both in 46th division then in Italy. After their first actions in Italy the C.O. of Lincolns said "...If we received drafts like this every time, the war would soon be over.".

Home Guard
Battalion	Headquarters	Formation Sign (dark blue on khaki)	Battalion	Headquarters	Formation Sign (dark blue on khaki)
1st	Blaydon	DHM 1	2nd	Chester le Street	DHM 2
3rd	Lanchester	DHM 3	4th	Consett	DHM 4
5th	Hamsterley	DHM 5	6th	Stanley	DHM 6
7th	Boldon	DHM 7	8th	South Shields	DHM 8
9th	Sunderland	DHM 9	10th	Gateshead	DHM 10
11th	Durham	DHM 11	12th	Castle Eden	DHM 12
13th	South Hylton	DHM 13	14th	Houghten le Spring	DHM 14
15th	Bishop Auckland	DHM 15	16th	Weardale	DHM 16
17th	Barnard Castle	DHM 17	18th	West Hartlepool	DHM 18
19th	Stockton on Tees	DHM 19	20th	Darlington	DHM 20
21st	Gateshead	DHM 21	22nd	Weatly Hill	DHM 22
23rd	Washington	DHM 23	24th	Sunderland	DHM 24
25th	Jarrow	DHM 25	26th	Seaham	DHM 26
Home Guard Anti-Aircraft units
Formation Sign (dark blue on khaki)	Headquarters or Location	AA Formation and Designation	Formation Sign (dark blue on khaki)	Headquarters or Location	AA Formation and Designation
DHM 71	Gateshead	71st Battery, 8th Anti-Aircraft Regiment (Home Guard) (HAA)	DHM 101	South Shields	110th Battery, 8th Anti-Aircraft Regiment (Home Guard) (Z battery)
DHM 102	Stockton-on-Tees	117th Battery, 11th Anti-Aircraft Regiment (Home Guard) (Z battery)	DHM 103	Sunderland	213th Battery, 8th Anti-Aircraft Regiment (Home Guard) (Z battery)
DHM 104	Durham	228th Battery, 11th Anti-Aircraft Regiment (Home Guard) (Z battery)	DHM 18	Hartlepool, (British Periclase Ltd)	A Troop LAA
DHM 19	Billingham on Tees, (ICI Ltd)	B, D Troops LAA	DHM 19	Middlesbrough	C Troop, 11th Anti-Aircraft Regiment (Home Guard) (LAA)
DHM 20	Aycliffe, (Royal Ordnance Factory)	E, F Troops LAA	DHM 23	Washington, (Washington Chemical Co.)	G Troop LAA

== Post-Second World War ==
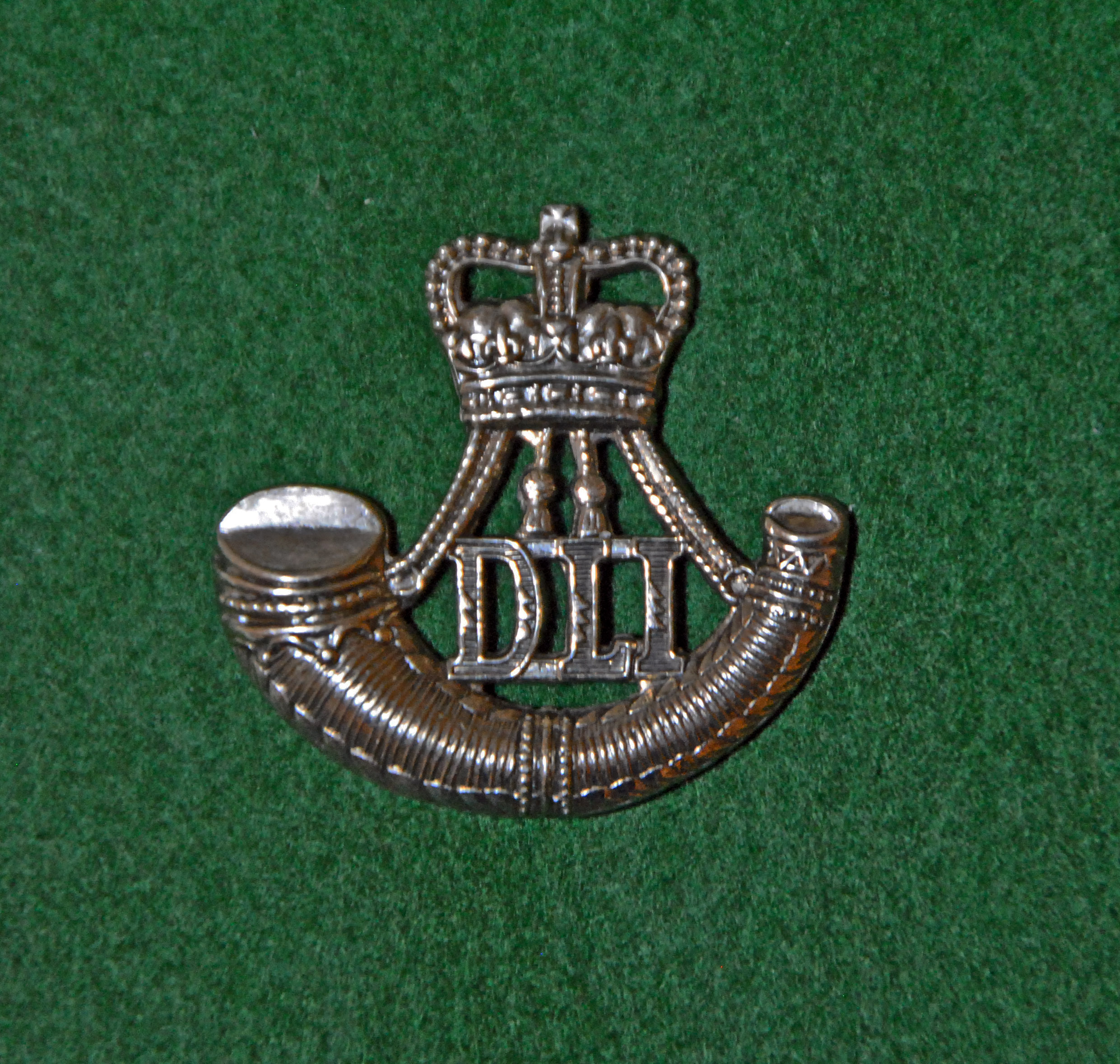
Queens crown cap badge of the Durham Light Infantry (1953–1968)

In the immediate post-war period, the army was significantly reduced with all regiments being reduced to one battalion. The D.L.I. was one of only seven regiments to re-raise its second battalion in the early 1950s. (Note: The others were the Green Howards, Lancashire Fusiliers, Royal Welch Fusiliers, Royal Inniskilling Fusiliers, Black Watch and Sherwood Foresters.) After a long period of suspended animation the Militia battalions were finally disbanded in 1953.

Battalion	Service	Fate	Notes
Regular
1st	Germany, Korea, Cyprus, Borneo	Amalgamated with other light infantry regiments to form The Light Infantry in 1968	Colours laid up in Durham Cathedral 12 December 1968.
2nd	Germany	Amalgamated with 1st battalion, September 1948	Reformed 1952, re-amalgamated with the 1st battalion in 1955.
Supplementary Reserve
3rd		Disbanded 1953	
4th		Disbanded 1953	Colours laid up in the parish church of St Mary the Virgin, Barnard Castle, 16 December 1956.
Territorial Army
6th		Amalgamated with the 8th battalion on 26 February 1967 to form the 6th/8th Battalion, the Durham Light Infantry. Disbanded and reformed on 1 April 1967 as D Company, The Light Infantry Volunteers and the 6th/8th (Territorial) Battalion, The Durham Light Infantry, the latter as part of the TAVR III.	Re-raised in March 1947.
8th		Same as the 6th battalion.	Re-raised in March 1947.
9th		Re-raised and disbanded 1947, by renaming as the 17th battalion (T.A.) the Parachute Regiment.	Colours laid up in the parish church of St Mary, Gateshead, 5 November 1949.

== Bibliography ==
- Beckett, Ian F W (2011). Britain's Part Time Soldiers. The Amateur Military Tradition 1558—1945 (2 ed.). Barnsley: Pen & Sword. ISBN 9781848843950.
- Chappel M 1986 British Battle Insignia (1). 1914-18 Osprey Publishing ISBN 9780850457278
- Davis, Brian L (1983). British Army Uniforms and Insignia of World War Two. London: Arm & Armour Press. ISBN 0-85368-609-2.
- Dunn, Clive, (2015) The Fighting Pioneers: the Story of the 7th Durham ..pLight Infantry, Barnsley: Pen & Sword, ISBN 978-1-47382-348-8.
- Joslen, Lt. Col. H. F. (April 2003). Orders of Battle, Second World War 1939—1945. London: HMSO. ISBN 9781843424741.
- Hart, P 2010 The 16th Battalion Durham Light Infantry in Italy 1943-1945 Pen & Sword ISBN 9781848844018
- Hibbard, Mike; Gibbs, Gary (2016). Infantry Divisions, Identification Schemes 1917 (1 ed.). Wokingham: The Military History Society.
- James, Brigadier E.A. (1978). British Regiments 1914–18. London: Samson Books Limited. ISBN 0-906304-03-2.
- Lewis P J 2010 8th Battalion The Durham Light Infantry 1939-1945 Naval and Military Press ISBN 9781845741457
- Miles, Capt. W F (1920). The Durham Forces in the Field. The Service battalions of the Durham Light Infantry. Naval and Military Press. ISBN 9781845740733.
- Order of Service 4th 1956 The Laying Up of the Colours of the 4th (Militia) Battalion The Durham Light Infantry Teesdale Mercury
- Order of Service 1st 1968 The Laying Up of the Colours of the 1st Battalion The Durham Light Infantry by the Light Infantry G Bails & Sons
- Order of Service 9th 1949 The Laying up of the Colours and the Dedication and Unveiling of the Book of Remembrance and Memorial to all Ranks of the 9th Bn The Durham Light Infantry (T.A.) Gale & Polden
- Rissik, David (2004) [1952]. The D.L.I. at War. The History of the Durham Light Infantry 1939-1945. Naval and Military Press. ISBN 9781845741440.
- Sadler J 2010 Dunkirk to Belsen. The Soldiers Own Dramatic Stories JR Books ISBN 9781906779870
- Vane, Hon. W L (1914). The Durham Light Infantry. The United Red and White Rose. London: Gale & Polden. OCLC 7279713.
- Ward, S G P (2005) [1962]. Faithful. The Story of the Durham Light Infantry. Naval and Military Press. ISBN 978-1-84574-147-1.
- Westlake, Ray (2020). Guide to the Volunteer Training Corps 1914-1918. Uckfield: Naval and Military Press. ISBN 9781783315390.
- Westlake, Ray (2010) Tracing the Rifle Volunteers, Barnsley: Pen and Sword, ISBN 978 1 84884 211 3.
- Whittacker, L B (1990). Stand Down. Orders of battle for the units of the Home Guard of the United Kingdom, November 1944. Newport: Ray Westlake Military Books. ISBN 1871167140.
- The Long Long Trail. Accessed 28 January 2015
