= 190th (2nd Durham Light Infantry) Brigade =

2nd Durham Light Infantry Brigade 190th (2nd Durham Light Infantry) Brigade
- Active: 18 January 1915–4 December 1916
- Country: United Kingdom
- Branch: Territorial Force
- Type: Infantry
- Role: Coast Defence; Training
- Size: Brigade
- Part of: 63rd (2nd Northumbrian) Division

Commanders
- Notable commanders: Brig-Gen E.T. Le Marchant

The 190th (2nd Durham Light Infantry) Brigade was a 2nd Line Territorial Force formation of the British Army during World War I. Formed from battalions of the Durham Light Infantry, it served in home defence without ever going overseas as a complete formation.

== Origin ==
The Durham Light Infantry Brigade had been formed in 1902 to command the part-time Volunteer battalions of the Durham Light Infantry (DLI). After the Volunteers were subsumed into the Territorial Force (TF) under the Haldane Reforms of 1908, the 6th–9th Battalions of the DLI constituted the DLI Brigade in the TF's Northumbrian Division.

When World War I broke out in 1914, the TF units were invited to volunteer for Overseas Service. On 15 August 1914, the War Office issued instructions to separate those men who had signed up for Home Service only, and on 31 August the formation of a reserve or 2nd Line unit was authorised for each TF unit where 60 per cent or more of the men had volunteered for Overseas Service. The Northumbrian Division and its components began training for deployment overseas while a cadre of officers and men who were unfit or who had not volunteered for overseas service remained at the units' headquarters to begin the task of raising 2nd Line battalions from the mass of volunteers who were coming forward. The titles of these 2nd-Line units were the same as the original, but distinguished by a '2/' prefix. In this way duplicate battalions, brigades and divisions were created, mirroring those TF formations being sent overseas.

== Service ==
The 2nd DLI Brigade Headquarters was formed at Durham on 18 January 1915 and the 2nd Northumbrian Division began to assemble round Newcastle upon Tyne later that month. While under training the division was also responsible for coast defence in North East England, from Seaham Harbour, through Sunderland to Newcastle. The 2nd DLI Brigade manned trenches between Seaham and Roker, with Brigade HQ at Leam Camp, Heworth.

The 1st Line embarked for France during April 1915 (where they received the designations 50th (Northumbrian) Division and 151st (Durham Light Infantry) Brigade). They joined the British Expeditionary Force (BEF) and were immediately thrown into action at the Second Battle of Ypres, suffering heavy casualties. The division's 2nd Line units had been providing reinforcement drafts to the 1st Line since January, now this became an important role. By May 1915, all the 2nd DLI Brigade's Home Service men had been transferred to form 23rd Provisional Bn (later 26th DLI) serving in coast defence, and thenceforth the 2nd Line units concentrated on training drafts for the 1st Line serving in France. The 2nd Northumbrian Division was numbered 63rd (2nd Northumbrian) Division and the 2nd DLI Brigade became 190th (2nd Durham Light Infantry) Brigade on 16 August. In November 1915 the brigade moved into winter quarters at Doncaster.

Early in 1916, the 63rd Division was seriously under strength, and the decision was made to break it up. Its number and ancillary units were transferred to the Royal Naval Division, veterans of Antwerp and Gallipoli, then arriving on the Western Front. 190th Brigade remained in existence, supplying drafts to the 1st Line in France, and moved to Catterick Camp on 22 July 1916.

== Order of Battle ==
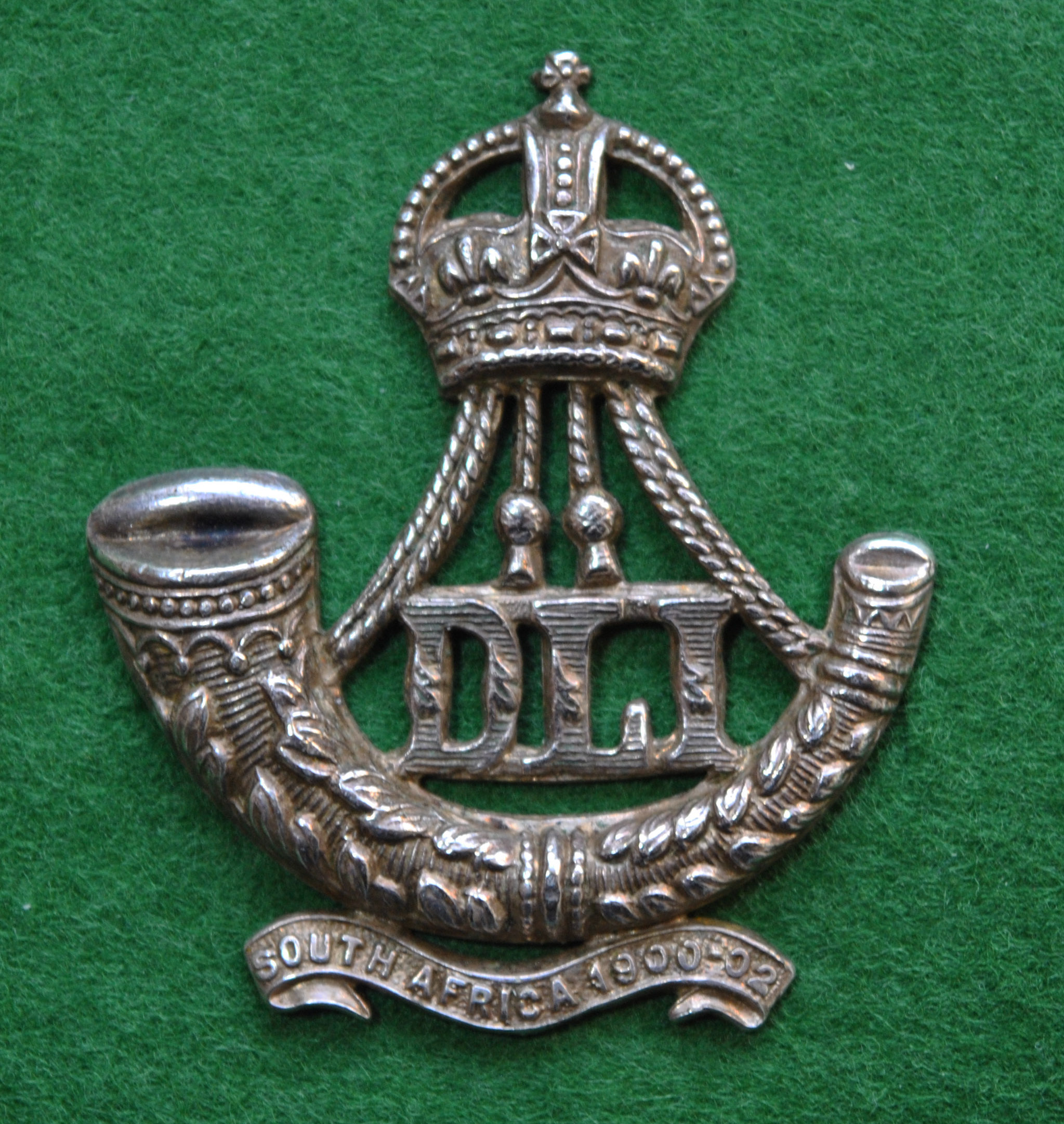
Cap badge of the Durham Light Infantry, Territorial version (1909–53).

The brigade's composition during World War I was as follows:

- 2/6th Battalion, DLI – formed at Ravensworth Park 26 September 1914
- 2/7th Battalion, DLI – formed at Sunderland 14 September 1914
- 2/8th Battalion, DLI – formed at Durham September 1914
- 2/9th Battalion, DLI – formed at Ravensworth 11 September 1914

== Disbandment ==
On 1 November 1916 the 2/9th DLI left the brigade and embarked for the Macedonian front, where it served as a garrison battalion. Then on 29 November 1916, the 2/6th, 2/7th and 2/8th DLI left to form the 214th Brigade in the 71st Division, a new home service division forming in southern England. With no troops remaining to command, 190th (2nd DLI) Brigade HQ was broken up at Catterick on 4 December 1916.

== Commander ==
The 190th (2nd DLI) Brigade only had one commander during its existence: Colonel Edward Thomas Le Marchant was appointed on 18 January 1915. He was promoted to Brigadier-General on 1 September on 1916, and on 11 October took over command of the 189th (2nd York and Durham) Brigade in addition, until it was disbanded on 11 November that year.

== Bibliography ==
- Maj A.F. Becke,History of the Great War: Order of Battle of Divisions, Part 2a: The Territorial Force Mounted Divisions and the 1st-Line Territorial Force Divisions (42–56), London: HM Stationery Office, 1935/Uckfield: Naval & Military Press, 2007, ISBN 1-847347-39-8.
- Maj A.F. Becke,History of the Great War: Order of Battle of Divisions, Part 2b: The 2nd-Line Territorial Force Divisions (57th–69th), with the Home-Service Divisions (71st–73rd) and 74th and 75th Divisions, London: HM Stationery Office, 1937/Uckfield: Naval & Military Press, 2007, ISBN 1-847347-39-8.
- Col John K. Dunlop, The Development of the British Army 1899–1914, London: Methuen, 1938.
- Clive Dunn, The Fighting Pioneers: the Story of the 7th Durham Light Infantry, Barnsley: Pen & Sword, 2015, ISBN 978-1-47382-348-8.
- Edward M. Spiers, The Army and Society 1815–1914, London: Longmans, 1980, ISBN 0-582-48565-7.
- Everard Wyrall, The Fiftieth Division 1914–1919, 1939/Uckfield: Naval & Military, nd, ISBN 1-84342-206-9.

== Online sources ==
- Great War Forum
- The Long, Long Trail
- The Regimental Warpath 1914–1918 (archive site)
