= Andrew Becher =

British Army officer (1858–1929)

Major-General Andrew Becher CBE
- Born: 26 August 1858; Brighton, Sussex
- Died: 11 May 1929 (aged 70); Bideford, Devon
- Military career
- Allegiance: United Kingdom
- Branch: British Army
- Rank: Major-General
- Commands: 2nd Lothian Volunteer Infantry Brigade; Durham Light Infantry Brigade; 63rd (2nd Northumbrian) Division
- Conflicts: First World War
- Awards: Commander of the Order of the British Empire

Major-General Andrew Cracroft Becher CBE (26 August 1858 – 11 May 1929) was a senior British Army officer.

== Military career ==
Educated at Rugby School, Becher was commissioned into the Royal Scots on 30 January 1878.

After service with the Norfolk Regiment in South Africa, he became a brevet colonel on 10 February 1904 and commander of the 2nd Lothian Volunteer Infantry Brigade in March 1907 and commander of the Durham Light Infantry Brigade in 1908.

He went on to be General Officer Commanding 63rd (2nd Northumbrian) Division in 1914 during the First World War and commander of the Southern Command Depot in Sutton Coldfield in 1916.

== Family ==
In 1883 he married Frances Maude Johnson; they had one son and two daughters. Following the death of his first wife he married Elisabeth Dalyell Stewart in 1907; they had three sons.

Military offices
New title	GOC 63rd (2nd Northumbrian) Division; 1914−1916	Succeeded by George Forestier-Walker
