= 188th (2/1st Northumberland) Brigade =

- Active: 5 January 1915 – 14 November 1916
- Country: United Kingdom
- Allegiance: British Crown
- Branch: British Army
- Type: Infantry
- Role: Training and Home Defence
- Size: Brigade
- Part of: 63rd (2nd Northumbrian) Division

The 188th (2/1st Northumberland) Brigade was formed in 1915 as a 2nd Line infantry brigade of the British Army's Territorial Force. It commanded four battalions of the Northumberland Fusiliers in the Home Defence role. It was broken up in November 1916 as its battalions were posted away.

== History ==
=== Origin ===
In accordance with the Territorial and Reserve Forces Act 1907 (7 Edw. 7, c.9) which brought the Territorial Force into being, the TF was intended to be a home defence force for service during wartime and members could not be compelled to serve outside the country. However, on the outbreak of war on 4 August 1914, many members volunteered for Imperial Service. Therefore, TF units were split into 1st Line (liable for overseas service) and 2nd Line (home service for those unable or unwilling to serve overseas) units. 2nd Line units performed the home defence role, although in fact most of these were also posted abroad in due course. Later, a 3rd Line was formed to act as a reserve, providing trained replacements for the 1st and 2nd Line units. Similarly, by 1915 most 2nd Line infantry battalions were formed into 2nd Line brigades and divisions with the same title and composition as the pre-war 1st Line formations.

188th (2/1st Northumberland) Brigade was organised in January 1915 from 2nd Line Territorial Force (TF) units of the Northumberland Fusiliers, and formed part of 63rd (2nd Northumbrian) Division. It was a duplicate of the pre-war Northumberland Brigade, Northumbrian Division of the TF (which were numbered 149th (Northumberland) Brigade and 50th (Northumbrian) Division respectively in April 1915).

=== Composition ===
The following units served in 188th Brigade:

- 2/4th Battalion, Northumberland Fusiliers
- 2/5th Battalion, Northumberland Fusiliers
- 2/6th Battalion, Northumberland Fusiliers
- 2/7th Battalion, Northumberland Fusiliers

=== Disbandment ===
The 63rd (2nd Northumbrian) Division was disbanded on 21 July 1916, and 188th Brigade followed on 14 November. The 2/4th, 2/5th and 2/6th battalions transferred to 217th Brigade in a new 72nd Division. The 2/7th Battalion sailed for Egypt on 20 January 1917 for service as a Garrison battalion.

The divisional number 63 was transferred to the Royal Naval Division, and its 3rd (Royal Marine) Brigade became a new 188th Brigade.

== See also ==
- 149th (Northumberland) Brigade for the 1st Line formation
- British infantry brigades of the First World War

== Bibliography ==
- Becke, Archibald F. (1936). Order of Battle of Divisions Part 2A. The Territorial Force Mounted Divisions and the 1st-Line Territorial Force Divisions (42–56). London: HMSO. OCLC 4405016.
- Becke, Archibald F. (1937). Order of Battle of Divisions Part 2B. The 2nd-Line Territorial Force Divisions (57th–69th) with The Home-Service Divisions (71st–73rd) and 74th and 75th Divisions. London: HMSO. OCLC 4405016.
- James, Brigadier E.A. (1978). British Regiments 1914–18. London: Samson Books Limited. ISBN 0-906304-03-2.
