= 63rd (2nd Northumbrian) Division =

- Active: 1914–1916
- Country: United Kingdom
- Branch: British Army
- Type: Infantry
- Service: World War I

Commanders
- Notable commanders: Andrew Cracroft Becher (1914–1916); George Forestier-Walker (1916)

The 63rd (2nd Northumbrian) Division of the British Army was a second-line Territorial Force division, formed in 1914, which served on home defence duties during the First World War. The division was formed as a duplicate of the 50th (Northumbrian) Division in 1914, composed primarily of soldiers recruited in north-eastern England. It remained on home defence and training duties in the north-east and east of England until 1916, when it was disbanded. Several of its constituent units would later serve overseas, deployed for support and garrison duties in almost every theatre of the war.

== History ==
The division was created as the "2nd Northumbrian Division", a second-line formation of the Northumbrian Division at the end of August 1914. At this time, Territorial Force soldiers could not be deployed overseas without their consent and the Territorial units were split into a "first line", with men who had volunteered for overseas service and a "second line", which was intended for home service only. The second line units also served to absorb the large number of new recruits who had joined the Territorial Force following the outbreak of war. The division's units formed through late 1914 and assembled in the Sunderland–Newcastle area, where it was responsible for coastal defence.

As with the original Northumbrian Division, the 2nd Northumbrian was organised into three infantry brigades. These were later numbered as the 188th (2/1st Northumberland) Brigade, composed of the 2/4th, 2/5th, 2/6th, and 2/7th Northumberland Fusiliers, the 189th (2nd York and Durham) Brigade, composed of the 2/4th East Yorkshire Regiment, the 2/4th and 2/5th Yorkshire Regiment (Green Howards) and the 2/5th Durham Light Infantry and the 190th (2nd Durham Light Infantry) Brigade, composed of the 2/6th, 2/7th, 2/8th and 2/9th Durham Light Infantry.

The 188th Brigade recruited from Newcastle and Northumberland, the 189th from the North and East Ridings of Yorkshire and the 190th entirely from County Durham. The division also raised second-line Territorial artillery, medical signal and engineer units from the same areas. While it did not contain any organic mounted units, it had two cavalry brigades attached at formation, the first-line Scottish Horse Mounted Brigade and the second-line 2/1st Welsh Border Mounted Brigade, as well as the first-line 1/1st East Riding of Yorkshire Yeomanry. The Officer Commanding was Andrew Becher, who had commanded a brigade of the original Northumbrian Division before the war.

Through the next two years, the 2nd Northumbrian, numbered as the 63rd Division in 1915, provided drafts of trained men for the 50th Division as well as carrying out home defence duties. On 20 May 1915, it was paraded at Newcastle to be inspected by King George V and Queen Mary. The following day, the East Yorkshire Yeomanry was moved south to join 1st Mounted Division. In July, the strength of its infantry battalions was set at a maximum of 600 men, with any more than this being transferred overseas, in August the Scottish Horse Brigade was shipped to Gallipoli, where it served as dismounted infantry. The division moved south to Nottinghamshire in November, where Major-General George Forestier-Walker, who had returned home after commanding a division on the Western Front, took command in February 1916. The 63rd began to disband in May 1916, and ceased to exist in July, with some units remaining independent for several months before being broken up or transferred to new divisions. Forestier-Walker formally remained in command until 8 September.

Four battalions were posted to overseas garrison duties, the 2/7th Northumberland Fusiliers to Egypt, the 2/4th East Yorkshires to Bermuda and the 2/5th and 2/9th Durham Light Infantry to Salonika. The remaining infantry units were transferred to the new 71st Division, 72nd Division and 73rd Divisions, all home-service units. The 2/7th Durham Light Infantry later served with the Allied force in the North Russia Intervention. The artillery was transferred to the Royal Naval Division in France, the engineers to the 15th Indian Division in Mesopotamia and the medical units to Salonika.

The divisional number was almost immediately reused for the 63rd (Royal Naval) Division, which was formed from the un-numbered Royal Naval Division on 19 July 1916 and its brigades were renumbered as the 188th, 189th and 190th Brigades. Prior to the Second World War, on the doubling of the Territorial Army, the second line duplicate of the 50th (Northumbrian) Infantry Division was numbered as the 23rd Division, after the Kitchener's army predecessor (as were the attached brigade, the 69th and 70th), not the 63rd, that division number and subsidiary brigades were not reused in the War.

== Order of battle ==
The order of battle was as follows (organisation details are taken from The British Army in the Great War unless otherwise noted):

=== Organisation, early 1915 ===
Organisation in mid-1915, at the time of the King's inspection.

188th (2/1st Northumberland) Brigade
- 2/4th Battalion, Northumberland Fusiliers
- 2/5th Battalion, Northumberland Fusiliers
- 2/6th Battalion, Northumberland Fusiliers
- 2/7th Battalion, Northumberland Fusiliers
189th (2nd York and Durham) Brigade
- 2/4th Battalion, East Yorkshire Regiment
- 2/4th Battalion, Yorkshire Regiment
- 2/5th Battalion, Yorkshire Regiment
- 2/5th Battalion, Durham Light Infantry
190th (2nd Durham Light Infantry) Brigade
- 2/6th Battalion, Durham Light Infantry
- 2/7th Battalion, Durham Light Infantry
- 2/8th Battalion, Durham Light Infantry
- 2/9th Battalion, Durham Light Infantry

Scottish Horse Mounted Brigade
- 1/1st Scottish Horse
- 1/2nd Scottish Horse
- 1/3rd Scottish Horse
2/1st Welsh Border Mounted Brigade
- 2/1st Cheshire Yeomanry
- 2/1st Shropshire Yeomanry
- 2/1st Denbighshire Hussars

Royal Engineers
- 2/1st Northumbrian Field Company – left for 1st Northumbrian Division January 1915
- 3/1st Northumbrian Field Company – joined after January 1915
- 2/2nd Northumbrian Field Company
- 1/3rd Northumbrian Field Company – joined January 1916
- 2nd Northumbrian Divisional Signal Company

Royal Army Medical Corps

- 2/1st Northumbrian Field Ambulance
- 3/2nd Northumbrian Field Ambulance
- 2/3rd Northumbrian Field Ambulance
- 2/1st Northumbrian Sanitary Section
Royal Artillery
- CCCXV (2/I Northumbrian) Brigade, RFA
- CCCXVI (2/II Northumbrian) Brigade, RFA
- CCCXVII (2/III Northumbrian) Brigade, RFA
- CCCXVIII (2/IV Northumbrian) (Howitzer) Brigade, RFA
- 2/1st Northumbrian (North Riding) Heavy Battery, RGA
Divisional troops
- 2nd Northumbrian Divisional Cyclist Company
- 1/1st East Riding of Yorkshire Yeomanry
- 63rd Divisional Train, Army Service Corps
  (529th, 530th, 531st and 532nd Companies, ASC)
- 2/1st Northumbrian Mobile Veterinary Section, AVC
- 63rd Divisional Ambulance Workshop

=== General officer commanding ===
- Major General Andrew Becher August 1914 – February 1916
- Major General George Forestier-Walker February 1916 – September 1916

== See also ==
- List of British divisions in World War I
