= 70th Infantry Brigade (United Kingdom) =

Infantry brigade of the British Army

70th Brigade 70th Infantry Brigade 70th Independent Infantry Brigade
- Active: 1914–1919; 1939–1944; 1950–?
- Country: United Kingdom
- Branch: British Army
- Type: Infantry
- Size: Brigade
- Nickname: "The Polar Bears" (divisional nickname)
- Engagements: First World War; Second World War

The 70th Infantry Brigade was an infantry brigade of the British Army that saw service during both the First and Second World War and postwar.

== First World War ==
The 70th Brigade was first raised in September 1914, shortly after the beginning of the First World War, as part of the 23rd Division. Consisting of men volunteering for Kitchener's Army, the brigade, after initially experiencing severe difficulties in training the men, due to a shortage of weapons and equipment, was sent to reinforce the British Expeditionary Force (BEF) on the Western Front in August 1915, later fighting, most notably, in the battles of the Somme, Messines and Passchendaele. The brigade remained there until late 1917 when it was sent to the Italian Front, remaining there until the end of the war. In June 1918 the brigade was awarded its only Victoria Cross (VC), belonging to Lieutenant-Colonel Charles Hudson of the Sherwood Foresters.

=== Order of battle ===
The 70th Brigade was constituted as follows during the war:

- 11th (Service) Battalion, Sherwood Foresters (until September 1918)
- 8th (Service) Battalion, King's Own Yorkshire Light Infantry
- 8th (Service) Battalion, York and Lancaster Regiment
- 9th (Service) Battalion, York and Lancaster Regiment
- 1/8th Battalion, Middlesex Regiment (from October 1915 until February 1916)
- 70th Machine Gun Company, Machine Gun Corps (formed July 1916, moved to 23rd Battalion, Machine Gun Corps 1 April 1918)
- 70th Trench Mortar Battery (formed 18 June 1916)

== Second World War ==
The brigade, disbanded in March 1919, was reformed in 1939 in the Territorial Army (or TA, the British Army's part-time reserve component) as the 70th Infantry Brigade just before the end of the interwar period, originally as part of the 50th (Northumbrian) Infantry Division, when the TA was ordered to be doubled in size, due to the increasing likelihood of another war in Europe, most likely with Germany. The brigade was formed as a second-line duplicate of the 151st Infantry Brigade and was composed of the 10th, 11th and 12th Battalions of the Durham Light Infantry (DLI), containing many former members of those battalions. The brigade, commanded by Brigadier P. Kirkup, who had commanded the 8th Battalion, DLI during the Great War, was transferred to the 23rd (Northumbrian) Division, the second-line duplicate of the 50th Division, on 2 October 1939, just under a month after the start of the Second World War. The 23rd Division was commanded by Major-General William Herbert and the 70th Brigade, together with the 69th Infantry Brigade, constituted the division.

The brigade, serving with the 23rd Division in Northern Command, was, despite being very poorly trained and equipped, ordered to join the British Expeditionary Force (BEF), then serving on the border between France and Belgium, as lines of communication (LoC) troops under GHQ BEF. The brigade (now with the 1st Battalion, Tyneside Scottish in place of the 12th DLI, which was redesignated on 1 January 1940) arrived in France on 25 April 1940. Together with the rest of the BEF, the brigade was, under a month after its arrival in France, involved in the Battle of France in May 1940 and the retreat to Dunkirk from where it took part in the Dunkirk evacuation.

After escaping from Dunkirk, the brigade, which had sustained some of the highest losses in the BEF (with each battalion totalling roughly 200 men), was serving in South East England under Southern Command, when the 23rd Division was disbanded in late June 1940 due to the heavy casualties it had suffered, with the 70th Brigade becoming an independent formation, with the title of 70th Independent Infantry Brigade, on 27 June 1940 and the 187th Field Ambulance, Royal Army Medical Corps (RAMC) under command. The brigade, reformed as a standard infantry brigade on 16 September, was sent to Iceland in October 1940 on garrison duties. The brigade remained there before being sent, in December 1941, to Scotland shortly after the United States entered the war. After serving in South Wales District and Western Command, the 70th Brigade was, on 18 May 1942, assigned to the 49th (West Riding) Infantry Division. The 49th Division, another TA formation, and composed of the 146th and 147th Infantry Brigades and supporting divisional troops, had also been serving in Iceland, where they gained the nickname of "The Polar Bears". The division's General Officer Commanding (GOC) was Major-General Henry Curtis, but on 30 April 1943 he was replaced by Major-General Evelyn Barker, a distinguished veteran of the Great War.

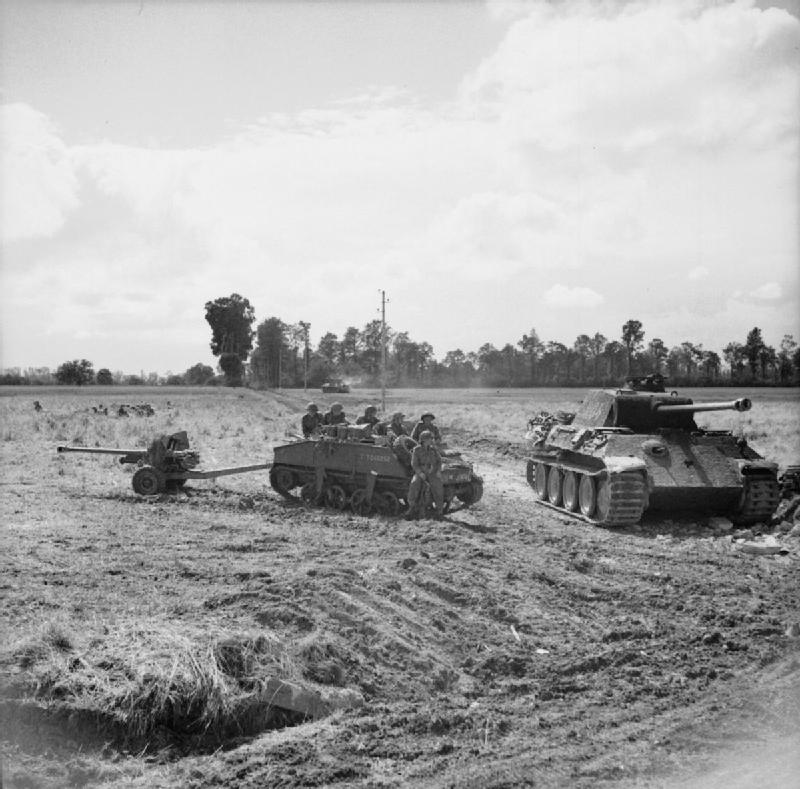
A Loyd carrier and 6-pounder anti-tank gun of the 11th Battalion, DLI parked alongside a knocked-out German Panther tank during Operation 'Epsom', 27 June 1944.

The brigade, now commanded by Brigadier Percy Paulet King, together with the rest of the 49th Division, spent the remaining two years in the United Kingdom, training for offensive action. In January 1944 Brigadier E. C. Cooke-Collis, who had commanded the 69th Brigade (which, along with the 70th, had constituted the old 23rd Division and upon the 23rd's disbandment was sent to the 50th Division) previously, took command. The brigade landed in Normandy on 14 June, eight days after D-Day on 6 June, as part of Battle of Normandy (codenamed Operation Overlord) six days later.

During Operation Martlet, the preparatory attack for Operation Epsom that took place on 25 June 1944, the brigade was heavily engaged around the village of Rauray with elements from the 12th SS Panzer and 26th SS Panzer Grenadier Regiments of the 12th SS Panzer Division. The 70th Brigade then fought a bloody battle around Rauray as Kampfgruppe Weidinger of 2nd SS Panzer Division counterattacked between 29 June and 1 July. For this it was given the battle honour of 'The Odon'

Thereafter it fought south of Tilly-sur-Seulles, before following the 49th Division's initial drive during I Corps' drive to the River Seine in late August. On 19 August, however, the brigade was withdrawn from the front line and the following day all officers and warrant officers in the brigade was informed personally by Major-General "Bubbles" Barker, the division's GOC, that the 70th Brigade was to be disbanded to fill the increasing gap in available infantry replacements. General Sir Bernard Montgomery, commanding the 21st Army Group, arrived the day after, saying much the same. At this stage of the war, the British Army was suffering from a severe lack of available manpower, having used up nearly all of its manpower reserves. Most of the men were posted to battalions of the 50th (Northumbrian) and the 51st (Highland) Infantry Divisions. By 19 October 1944, the brigade officially ceased to exist. Its place in the 49th Division was taken by the 56th Infantry Brigade, previously an independent formation.

=== Order of battle ===
The 70th Infantry Brigade was constituted as follows during the war:

- 10th Battalion, Durham Light Infantry
- 11th Battalion, Durham Light Infantry
- 12th Battalion, Durham Light Infantry (until 31 December 1939)
- 1st Battalion, Tyneside Scottish, Black Watch (Royal Highland Regiment)) (from 1 January 1940)

During the period 27 June to 17 October 1940 the following additional unit was under command:

- 187th Field Ambulance, Royal Army Medical Corps

=== Commanders ===
The following officers commanded the 70th Brigade during the war:

- Brigadier P. Kirkup (until 26 September 1941, again 22 October 1941 until 24 July 1942)
- Lieutenant-Colonel C.D. Marley (Acting, from 26 September until 22 October 1941)
- Brigadier P.P. King (from 24 July 1942 until 20 January 1944)
- Brigadier E.C. Cooke-Collis (from 20 January 1944)

== Post-War ==
During the Mau Mau uprising, East Africa Command controlled 39th Infantry Brigade, 49th Infantry Brigade, and 70th (East African) Infantry Brigade, 70 Brigade controlling the King's African Rifles battalions. Brigade headquarters was at Nyeri where the Brigade Signals Troop was also located. May have operated from 1953 onwards.

On independence over the December 1963-January 1964 period the brigade was disestablished by becoming the basis of 1 Brigade, Kenya Army.

== Bibliography ==
- Baverstock, Kevin. Breaking the Panzers: The Bloody Battle for Rauray. Sutton Publishing, 2002. ISBN 0-7509-2895-6
- Delaforce, Patrick. The Polar Bears - Monty's Left Flank: From Normandy to the Relief of Holland with the 49th Division. Sutton Publishing, 2003. ISBN 0-7509-3194-9
- Casualties for 49th Division
- Public Record Office, WO 171/653, Headquarters War Diary of 70th Infantry Brigade from January - July 1944
- Joslen, H. F. (2003) [1960]. Orders of Battle: Second World War, 1939–1945. Uckfield, East Sussex: Naval and Military Press. ISBN 978-1-84342-474-1.
