= George Forestier-Walker =

British Army officer (1866–1939)

Major-General Sir George Forestier-Walker KCB
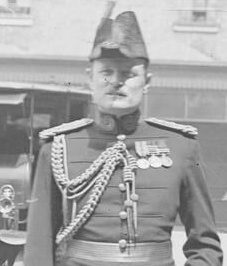
- Born: George Townshend Forestier Walker; 2 August 1866; Camberley, Surrey, England
- Died: 23 January 1939 (aged 72); Child Okeford, Dorsetshire, England
- Military career
- Allegiance: United Kingdom
- Branch: British Army
- Service years: 1884–1920
- Rank: Major-General
- Unit: Royal Artillery
- Commands: 21st Division; 27th Division
- Conflicts: Second Boer War; World War I
- Awards: Knight Grand Cross of the Order of the Bath

Major-General Sir George Townshend Forestier-Walker KCB (2 August 1866 – 23 January 1939) was a senior British Army officer during World War I.

== Early life and education ==
Forestier-Walker was born in Camberley, the third son of Major-General George Edmund Lushington Walker and Camilla Georgina Calder, only daughter of Major-General J. Patrick Calder. The grandson of Sir George Townshend Walker, 1st Baronet, he was from an illustrious military family. He was educated at Rugby School and the Royal Military Academy, Woolwich.

== Early military career ==
Forestier-Walker was commissioned as a subaltern, with the rank of lieutenant, into the Royal Artillery in December 1884.

He was promoted to captain in February 1895 and attended the Staff College, Camberley, from 1896 to 1897, where Douglas Haig and Edmund Allenby, both future field marshals, Richard Haking, a full general, William Furse and George Macdonogh, both future lieutenant generals, were among his fellow students. He later succeeded Captain Count Gleichen as a staff captain at the War Office in London in May 1898 and in July 1899 he was appointed a deputy assistant adjutant general (DAAG) at the War Office, again taking over this post from Gleichen.

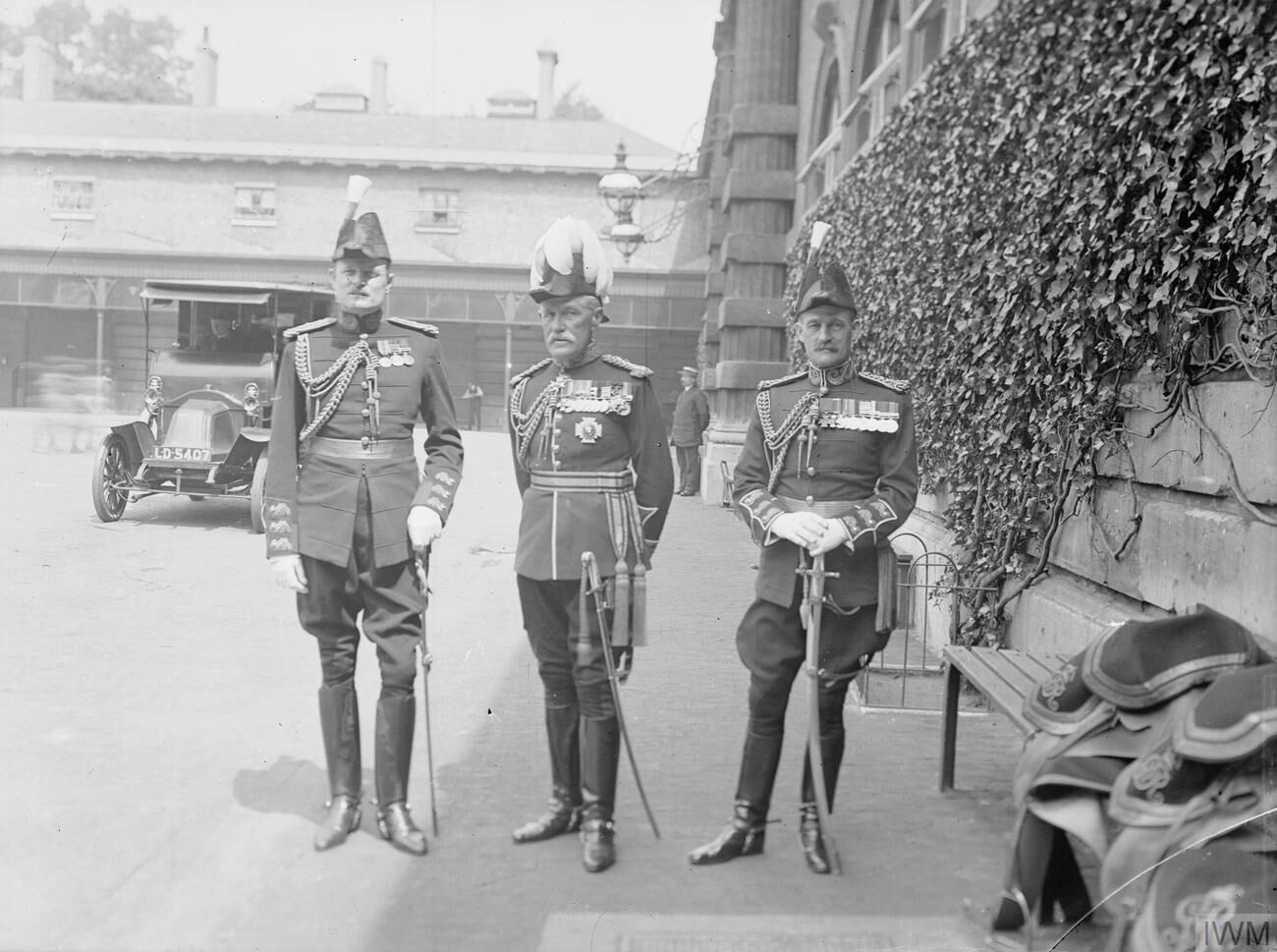
Forestier-Walker, pictured here when he was a colonel, together with Lieutenant-General Horace Smith-Dorrien and Colonel Paul Aloysius Kenna, sometime before the First World War.

He served as a DAAG during the Second Boer War, during which he was promoted to major in June 1900. He became chief staff officer of the Dervish War in 1902, assistant quartermaster general for intelligence for the Somaliland Field Force in December 1902 and saw action again during the East African campaign before becoming assistant quartermaster general at Southern Command in 1910. A brevet lieutenant colonel in September 1904, he was promoted to brevet colonel in February 1907, (made a full colonel in October 1910) and was promoted to temporary brigadier general and succeeded Frederick McCracken as brigadier general, general staff (BGGS) of Irish Command in November 1912.

== First World War ==
Forestier-Walker served in World War I, initially as chief of staff of II Corps of the British Expeditionary Force (BEF), which, commanded by General Sir Horace Smith-Dorrien, went to France in August 1914.

After being made a Companion of the Order of the Bath in February 1915, he was promoted to the temporary rank of major general and became general officer commanding (GOC) of the 21st Division, a Kitchener's Army formation, in April that year. In June his major general's rank became permanent and was a reward "for distinguished service in the Field".

He left with his division for the Western Front and fought at the Battle of Loos in September. His performance, and that of his division, was not up to the standards expected by his superiors and, soon after the battle came to an end, he was removed by Lieutenant General Sir Charles Fergusson, Smith-Dorrien's successor as GOC of II Corps, "on the grounds of his unpopularity with the troops".

After relinquishing command of the division to Major General Claud Jacob, he went on to command the 63rd (2nd Northumbrian) Division, Territorial Force (TF), in the Home Forces from February 1916 and to command the 65th (2nd Lowland) Division from September 1916, which was also serving in the Home Forces.

In December 1916 he became GOC 27th Division, serving as part of the British Salonika Army on the Macedonian front and eventually, after the armistice of Mudros, at Tiflis in Georgia.

== Postwar and final years ==
He retired from the army in June 1920 and became colonel commandant of the Royal Artillery in March 1931.

== Personal life ==
In 1892, he married Lady Mary Maud Diana Liddell, daughter of Henry Liddell, 2nd Earl of Ravensworth. They had two sons, both of whom died young, and two daughters:

- Lilian Diana Forestier Walker (12 January 1894 – 5 August 1922)
- George Forestier Walker (born and died 31 May 1898)
- Helen Mary Cecilia Forestier-Walker (17 April 1895 – 28 July 1987)
- Cortlandt Simon Michael Forestier Walker (20 November 1902 – 29 August 1903)

He died at Child Okeford, Blandford, aged 72.

Military offices
Preceded by Andrew Becher	GOC 63rd (2nd Northumbrian) Division; February–September 1916	Succeeded by Post disbanded
Preceded by Theodore Stephenson	GOC 65th (2nd Lowland) Division; 1916−1917	Succeeded by Edward Montagu-Stuart-Wortley
