= William Herbert (British Army officer, born 1880) =

British Army general (1880–1949)

Major-General William Herbert CB CMG DSO* DL
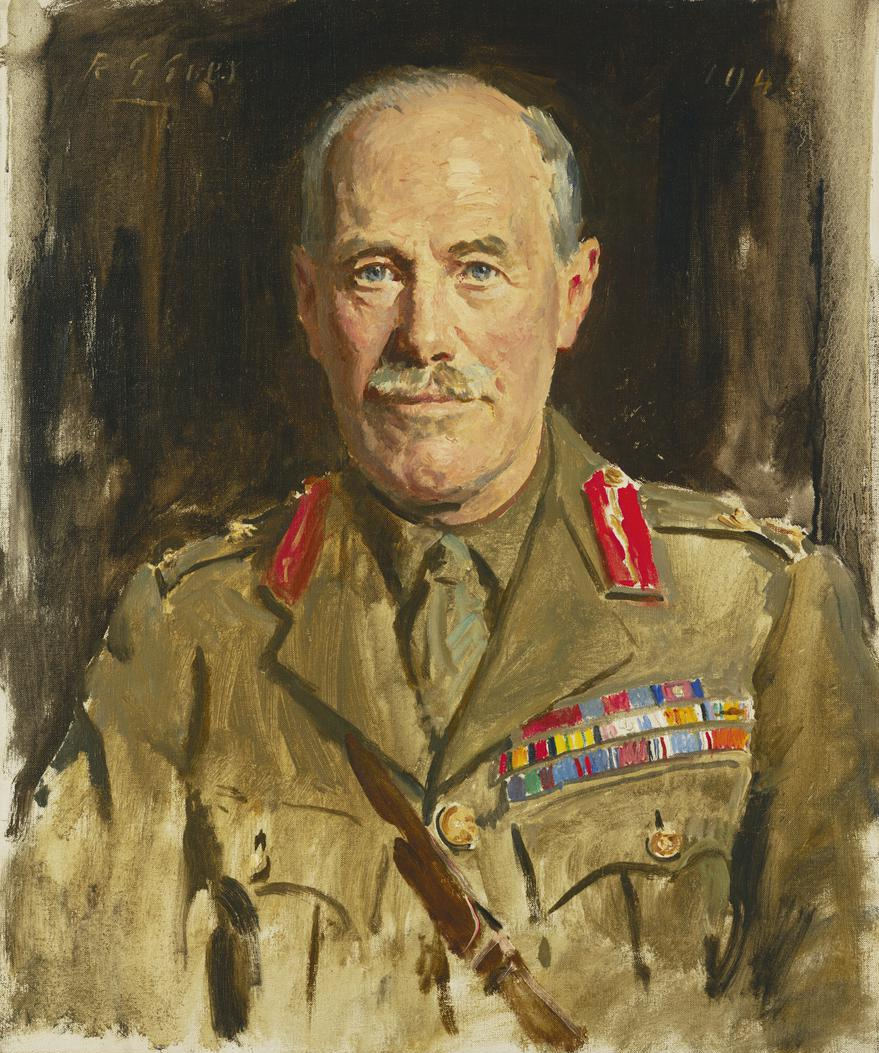
- Born: 26 August 1880; Fillongley, Warwickshire
- Died: 26 April 1949 (aged 68); Cheltenham, Gloucestershire
- Military career
- Allegiance: United Kingdom
- Branch: British Army
- Service years: 1900–1939; 1939–1940
- Rank: Major-General
- Service number: 22797
- Unit: Northumberland Fusiliers
- Commands: 23rd (Northumbrian) Division (1939–40); 50th (Northumbrian) Infantry Division (1935–39); 10th Brigade (1932–34); 1st Battalion, Northumberland Fusiliers (1925–29); 112th Brigade (1918–19); 1st Battalion, Northumberland Fusiliers (1916–18)
- Conflicts: Second Boer War; First World War; Second World War
- Awards: Companion of the Order of the Bath; Companion of the Order of St Michael and St George; Distinguished Service Order & Bar; Mentioned in Despatches

Major-General William Norman Herbert, CB, CMG, DSO & Bar, DL (26 August 1880 – 26 April 1949) was a senior British Army officer who served as colonel of the Northumberland Fusiliers and commanded the 23rd (Northumbrian) Division in the Battle of France during the Second World War.

== Military career ==
Herbert entered the Royal Military College, Sandhurst, where he was commissioned as a second lieutenant into the British Army's Northumberland Fusiliers on 11 August 1900. He saw active service in the Second Boer War from later that year, and was promoted to lieutenant on 12 December 1901.

Following the end of the war in May 1902, he returned to the United Kingdom on the SS Europan, which arrived at Southampton in early September.

Herbert served in the First World War, during which he was promoted in September 1915 to major and on 10 November was appointed a brigade major. He became a brevet lieutenant colonel in January 1918. He was commanding officer (CO) of the 1st Battalion, Northumberland Fusiliers, in which capacity he captured an enemy position together with fifty-nine prisoners for which he was awarded a Bar to his Distinguished Service Order (DSO) in January 1919, the citation for which reads:

He commanded his battalion with marked ability and skill, and when one of his advanced posts had been captured he organised and led a counter-attack, after a personal reconnaissance, whereby the position was recaptured, together with fifty-nine prisoners. Later, after an assaulting battalion had been held up by heavy machine-gun fire and his battalion was in reserve, he was ordered to clear the situation, which, after a close reconnaissance under heavy machine-gun fire, he did with complete success and slight casualties.

After attending the Staff College, Camberley, Herbert became a staff officer at Northern Command in 1930, commander of the 10th Brigade in March 1932 and General Officer Commanding (GOC) 50th (Northumbrian) Infantry Division in February 1935. He was appointed a Companion of the Order of the Bath on 1 January 1935, and colonel of the Northumberland Fusiliers on 5 July that year when he took over from Major General Percival Spearman Wilkinson.

Although he retired from the army in February 1939, Herbert was recalled during the Second World War as GOC 23rd (Northumbrian) Division to lead the deployment of that formation as part of the British Expeditionary Force in the Battle of France in April 1940. He retired for a second time when the division was disbanded on 30 June 1940. He settled in Worcestershire, and became deputy lieutenant for the county from 1946 until his death three years later in 1949.

== Bibliography ==
- Smart, Nick (2005). Biographical Dictionary of British Generals of the Second World War. Barnsley, South Yorkshire: Pen and Sword Books. ISBN 1844150496.

Honorary titles
Preceded by Sir Percival Wilkinson	Colonel of the Royal Northumberland Fusiliers; 1935–1947	Succeeded by Harold Morgan
Military offices
Preceded by Richard Pope-Hennessy	GOC 50th (Northumbrian) Infantry Division; 1935–1939	Succeeded by Giffard Martel
