= 23rd (Northumbrian) Division =

Infantry division of the British Army in WWII

- Potential example of the divisional shoulder patch: the White Rose of York.
- Active: 2 October 1939 – 30 June 1940
- Country: United Kingdom
- Branch: Territorial Army
- Type: Infantry
- Engagements: Battle of France

The 23rd (Northumbrian) Division was an infantry division of the British Army, which fought briefly in the Battle of France during the Second World War. In March 1939, after the re-emergence of Germany as a European power and its occupation of Czechoslovakia, the British Army increased the number of divisions within the Territorial Army by duplicating existing units. The 23rd (Northumbrian) Division was formed in October 1939, as a second-line duplicate of the 50th (Northumbrian) Motor Division. It was made up of two brigades, unlike regular infantry divisions that were composed of three, with battalions hailing from the north of England.

It was intended that the division would remain in the United Kingdom to complete training and preparation, before being deployed to France within twelve months of the war breaking out. The division spent little time training and its soldiers were dispersed and used to guard strategically important and vulnerable locations across North East England. Guard duty and little preparation for war were seen as a hindrance to good morale. In France, the British Expeditionary Force (BEF) was suffering from a manpower shortage among rear-line units. To boost morale, provide additional labour and guards for the rear echelon of the BEF, and score political points with the French Government and military, the division was sent to France in April 1940, leaving behind most of its administration and logistical units as well as heavy weapons and artillery. The men were assigned to aid in the construction and guarding of airfields. The Chief of the Imperial General Staff, Edmund Ironside, secured a promise from the BEF that the division would not be used in action owing to it being untrained and incomplete.

When Germany invaded Belgium and the Netherlands, the BEF and French armies moved to meet the attack, leaving behind the 23rd Division to continue guarding airfields. The main German attack came through the Ardennes and moved to cut off the British and French forces in northern France. With no other reserves available, the 23rd Division was ordered to the front line to defend the Canal du Nord—the only watercourse obstacle between the main German assault and the English Channel—and the only defensible position at which to stop the German attempt to encircle the BEF. By the time the division arrived at the canal, the Germans had already crossed south of their sector where French forces had yet to take up positions. Having destroyed the bridges in their area, the division was ordered to fall back to new positions to defend the town of Arras. Before the 70th Infantry Brigade could take up this new position, it was caught by advancing German armoured forces and overrun. The military situation further deteriorated, resulting in the decision to begin the Dunkirk evacuation. Elements of the division conducted delaying and rearguard actions around the perimeter before being evacuated on 31 May 1940, having suffered heavy losses. In Britain, the division was disbanded and its units were transferred to other formations to bring them up to strength.

== Background ==
Throughout the 1930s, tensions built between Germany and the United Kingdom and its allies. During late 1937 and 1938, German demands for the annexation of Sudetenland in Czechoslovakia led to an international crisis. To avoid war, the British Prime Minister, Neville Chamberlain, met with the German Chancellor Adolf Hitler in September and came to the Munich Agreement, which accepted that the Germans would annex the Sudetenland. Chamberlain had intended the agreement to lead to further peaceful resolution of differences, but relations between both countries soon deteriorated. On 15 March 1939, Germany breached the terms of the agreement by invading and occupying the remnants of the Czech state.

On 29 March, the British Secretary of State for War Leslie Hore-Belisha announced plans to increase the part-time Territorial Army (TA) from 130,000 men to 340,000, doubling the number of divisions. (Note: The TA was a reserve of the British regular army made up of part-time volunteers. By 1939, its intended role was to be the sole method of expanding the size of the British armed forces (comparable to the creation of Kitchener's Army during the First World War). First-line territorial formations would create a second-line division using a cadre of trained personnel and if needed, a third division would also be created. All TA recruits were required to take the general service obligation meaning that territorial soldiers could be sent overseas. (This avoided the complications experienced with the First World War Territorial Force, whose members had to volunteer for overseas service.)) The plan was for existing TA divisions, referred to as the first-line, to recruit over their establishments, aided by an increase in pay for Territorials, the removal of restrictions on promotion which had hindered recruiting, the construction of better-quality barracks, and an increase in supper rations. The units would then form a new division, referred to as the second-line, from cadres. This process was dubbed "duplicating". The 23rd (Northumbrian) Division was to be created as a second-line formation, a duplicate of the first-line 50th (Northumbrian) Motor Division. (Note: British military doctrine development during the inter-war period resulted in the three kinds of division by the end of the 1930s: the infantry division, the mobile division (later called the armoured division), and the motor division. The historian David French wrote, "The main role of the infantry ... was to break into the enemy's defensive position". This would then be exploited by the Mobile division, followed by the motor divisions that would "carry out the rapid consolidation of the ground captured by the Mobile divisions" therefore "transform[ing] the 'break-in' into a 'break-through". In 1938, the army decided to create six Motor Divisions from TA units. Only the 55th (West Lancashire), the 1st London and the 50th (Northumbrian) divisions were converted before the war. French wrote that the motor division "matched that of the German army's motorized and light divisions. But there the similarities ended". German motorised divisions contained three brigades and were as fully equipped as a regular infantry division, while the smaller light divisions contained a tank battalion. Whereas the motor division, fully motorised and capable of transporting all their infantry, contained no tanks and was "otherwise much weaker than normal infantry divisions" or their German counterparts.) Despite the intention for the army to grow, the programme was complicated by a lack of central guidance on the expansion and duplication process and issues regarding the lack of facilities, equipment and instructors. It had been envisioned by the War Office that the duplicating process and recruiting the required numbers of men would take no more than six months. The 50th (Northumbrian) Motor Division started this process in March. For example, the Durham Light Infantry (DLI) created three new battalions, each based around an initial cadre of just 25 officers and men. In April, limited conscription was introduced. At that time 34,500 men, all aged 20, were conscripted into the regular army, initially to be trained for six months before being deployed to the forming second-line units. The process varied widely between the TA divisions. Some were ready in weeks while others had made little progress by the time the Second World War began.

== History ==
=== Formation ===
The 50th Division created the 69th Infantry Brigade as a second-line duplicate of the 150th Infantry Brigade, and the 70th Infantry Brigade as a second-line duplicate of the 151st Infantry Brigade. These brigades had been created by the outbreak of the war and were administered by the 50th Division until the 23rd (Northumbrian) divisional headquarters was formed on 2 October 1939. At this point, they were transferred to the new division, which in turn was assigned to Northern Command. Command of the division was given to Major-General William Norman Herbert, who was called out of retirement and had previously commanded the 50th Division. The 69th Brigade comprised the 5th Battalion, East Yorkshire Regiment, the 6th and 7th Battalions, Green Howards; and the 70th Infantry Brigade comprised the 10th, 11th and 12th Battalions, DLI.

The 23rd (Northumbrian) Division lacked any official descriptive, being labelled neither a "Motor" division like its first-line parent formation, nor an "Infantry" division akin to the majority of other British divisions. The shoulder patch is debated in the sources. It has been described as the white rose of Yorkshire but also as a Tudor rose (an amalgamation of the White Rose of York and the Red Rose of Lancaster). Sources differ on whether the background was blue or green. Michael Chappell stated the white rose motif represented the Yorkshire regiments within the division, and that a green background represented the light infantry lineage of these regiments. "Examples of this sign made up for wear on uniform (with the rose stencilled on a felt patch) are in collections and indicate that the 23rd were probably one of [the few] formations wearing 'illegal' battle insignia in 1940".

=== Initial service and transfer to France ===
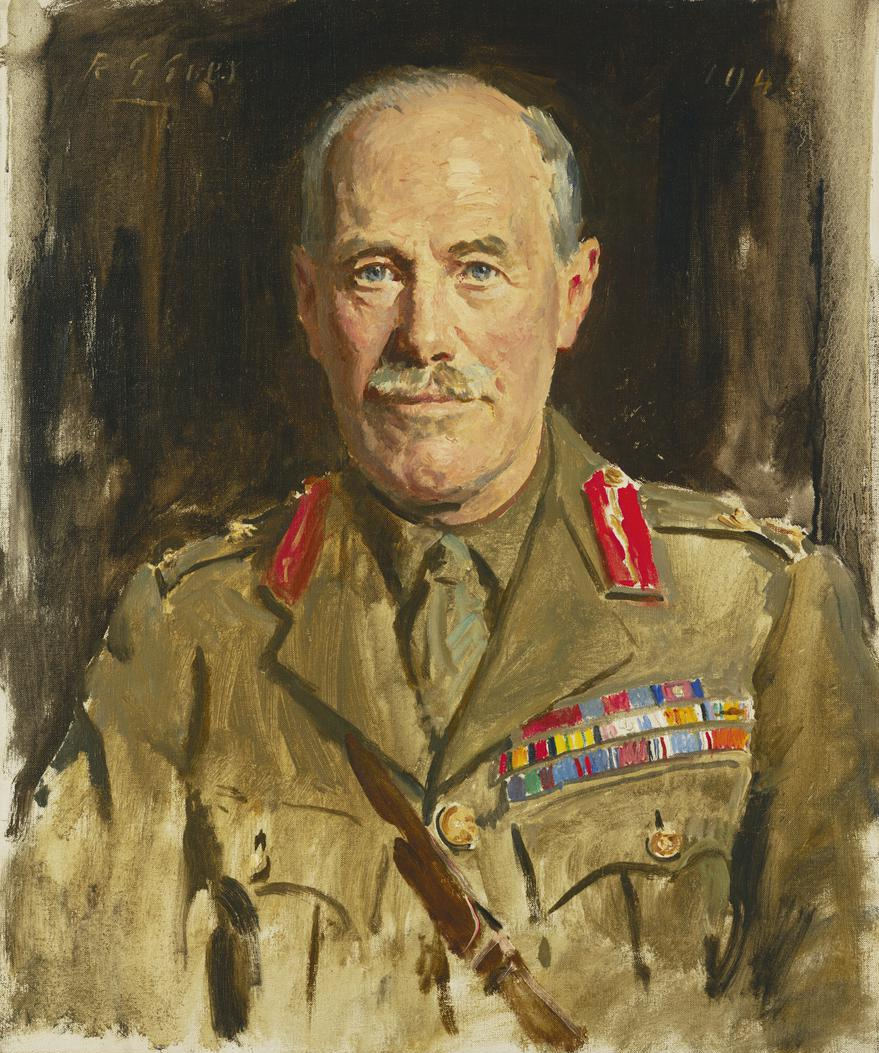
Major-General Herbert, commander of the division, a 1940 portrait by Reginald Eves.

Following the outbreak of hostilities, the National Service (Armed Forces) Act 1939 was passed. This established nineteen as the minimum age for front line service, and soldiers under that age were transferred from combat units. Due to this policy, 40,000 TA men were moved between units. For the 23rd (Northumbrian) Division, this resulted in the loss of upwards of 10 per cent of its strength. It was envisioned that the TA divisions each be deployed intact to reinforce the regular army formations in France as equipment became available, all 26 TA divisions being deployed by the end of the first year of the war. Instead, the division was assigned to guarding vulnerable points and other locations across North East England; a common assignment for second-line formations, to free up first-line formations for training. This left little time for actual training other than parade-ground drill, a situation that adversely impacted morale. On 1 February, the 12th DLI became the Tyneside Scottish and a part of the Black Watch.

As 1939 turned into 1940, the division became caught up in an effort to address manpower shortages among the British Expeditionary Force's (BEF) rear-echelon units. (Note: By the end of April, Lionel Ellis stated that there were "78,864 [men employed on] lines-of-communication duties; 23,545 were in headquarters of various services and missions, hospitals and miscellaneous employment; 9,051 were in drafts en route; 2,515 were not yet allocated, and 6,859 were with the Advanced Air Striking Force". Included in these figures, was "upwards of 10,000 men, and other large units [who] were engaged on railway and building construction, at bases and on the long lines of communication".) More men were needed to work along the line of communication, and the army had estimated that by mid-1940 it would need at least 60,000 pioneers. The lack of such men had taxed the Royal Engineers (RE) and Auxiliary Military Pioneer Corps (AMPC) as well as impacting frontline units, which had to be diverted from training to help construct defensive positions along the Franco-Belgian border. To address this issue, it was decided to deploy untrained territorial units as an unskilled workforce; thereby alleviating the strain on the existing pioneer units and freeing up regular units to complete training. As a result, the decision was made to deploy the 12th (Eastern), 23rd (Northumbrian), and the 46th Infantry Divisions to France. Each division would leave their heavy equipment and most of their logistical, administrative, and support units behind. In total, the elements of the three divisions that were transported to France amounted to 18,347 men. (Note: For comparison, the 1939 war-establishment (the on-paper strength) of a three-brigade infantry division was 13,863 men, and a two-brigade motor division's war-establishment was 10,136 men.) The divisions were to aid in the construction of airfields and pill-boxes. The intent was that by August their job would be completed and they could return to the United Kingdom to resume training before being redeployed to France as front-line soldiers. The Army believed that this diversion from guard duty would also raise morale. Lionel Ellis, the author of the British official history of the BEF in France, wrote that while the divisions "were neither fully trained nor equipped for fighting ... a balanced programme of training was carried out so far as time permitted". Historian Tim Lynch commented that the deployment also had a political dimension, allowing "British politicians to tell their French counterparts that Britain had supplied three more infantry divisions towards the promised nineteen by the end of the year".

General Edmund Ironside, Chief of the Imperial General Staff, was opposed to such a use of these divisions. He reluctantly caved to the political pressure to release the divisions, having been assured by General Sir John Gort (commander of the BEF) that the troops would not be used as frontline combat formations. The 23rd left the United Kingdom on 21 April 1940, arrived in France the following day, and was placed under the direct command of the BEF. As a labour force, the division was deployed to the region around St Pol to build airstrips. It transferred without heavy equipment or Universal Carriers and impressed a limited amount of civilian transport for mobility. The men took their rifles, although some had still not been trained in their use. Each battalion brought 14 Bren light machine guns (although few had been trained in how to use them), at most 10 Boys anti-tank rifles, and a few 2 in (51 mm) mortars.

=== German invasion of France ===
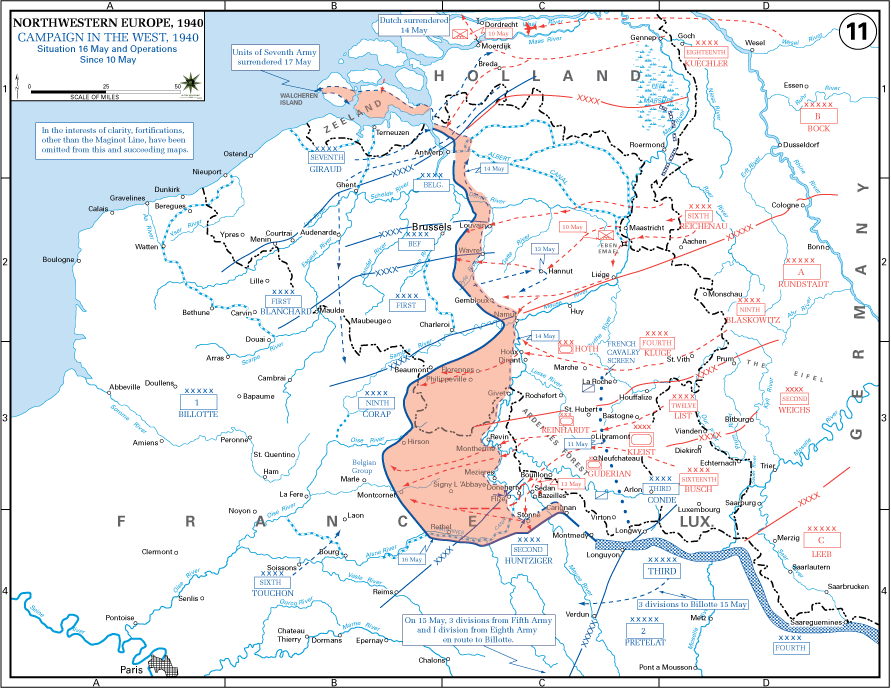
The operating area of the various Belgian, British, and French field armies and Army groups are shown in blue. The German field armies and Corps are shown in red. The red area denotes the territory captured by Germany between 10 and 16 May 1940.

On 10 May 1940, the Phoney War—the period of inactivity on the Western Front since the start of the conflict—came to an end as the German military invaded Belgium and the Netherlands. As a result, the majority of the BEF along with the best French armies and their strategic reserve moved forward to assist the Belgian and Dutch armies. While these forces attempted to stem the tide of the German advance, the main German assault pushed through the Ardennes Forest and crossed the River Meuse. This initiated the Battle of Sedan and threatened to split the Allied armies in two, separating those in Belgium from the rest of the French military along the Franco-German border.

The 23rd (Northumbrian) Division, which had not advanced with the rest of the BEF, was still employed in rear-echelon duties. It was spread across the French departments of Pas-de-Calais and Somme, and had now been assigned to guard airfields. Demonstrating the division's lack of mobility, when the 10th Battalion, DLI was assigned to guard airfields near Abbeville (south of the River Somme) it required all of the divisional transport and immobilised all other units to accomplish this move.

Once the Allied commanders had realised that the German crossing of the Meuse had turned into a major breakthrough, the BEF and French armies began a fighting withdrawal from Belgium back to France. On 17 May, the lack of French reserves prompted Général Alphonse Joseph Georges, commander of all Allied forces in North-East France, to order the 23rd Division to be deployed to the new frontline along the Canal du Nord to face the German breakthrough. The following day, the division was placed under the command of Petreforce, the grouping of the 12th (Eastern), the 23rd Division, and other nearby units under the 12th Division's commander Major-General Roderic Petre. Petre informed his subordinates of the over-optimistic report that had been given to him, that the French were resilient on either side of the German breakthrough and that only small German units had penetrated deep into French territory; forces Petreforce could handle.

=== Fighting near Arras ===
The 23rd was ordered to occupy a 16-mile (26-kilometre) front along the Canal du Nord, around 6 miles (10 km) west of Cambrai and 10 miles (16 km) east of Arras. The canal represented the last major water obstacle between the advancing German force and the English Channel. The 23rd Division was the only British formation standing in the way of the main German assault and the BEF's supply lines. The British official history acknowledges that the division "could do little to stop" the advancing Germans. The troops, having to make their way through refugee-packed roads, arrived along the canal but were unable to dig-in due to a lack of tools. Brigadier Richard Dawnay's 69th Brigade held the northern portion of the division's sector, taking up positions at Arleux and was in contact with the French First Army on their northern flank. Brigadier Philip Kirkup's 70th Brigade held the southern flank, to a distance of about 10 miles (16 km) north of Péronne. Additional French troops were supposed to be covering the division's southern flank, but due to the swift nature of the German advance they never arrived along the canal.

The author Hugh Sebag-Montefiore described the state of the unfinished canal: "there was no water in it, and the deep ditch that was supposed to hold up the German armour would not have challenged a car in some places, let alone a tank". At this point, a composite battery of eleven field guns and two 4.5-inch (110 mm) howitzers were assigned to the division, coming from a Royal Artillery (RA) training camp near Arras. Most of the guns lacked the required equipment for indirect fire and could only be fired over open sights; some had no sights at all. The division soon encountered the vanguard of the German force, who did not attempt to force the canal in the division's area. With Germans nearby, the order was given to blow the bridges across the canal that included one bridge being destroyed while refugees were still crossing. During the day, an alleged spy was brought to the headquarters of the 1st Battalion, Tyneside Scottish. The individual was briefly interrogated by Lieutenant-Colonel Hugh Swinburne and the battalion's French liaison officer before a summary execution was carried out by Sergeant Dick Chambers. The division soon suffered its first casualties from air attacks. Unbeknown to the troops, the German advance troops had already formed a bridgehead over the canal to the south of the division.

Having been in position for less than 24 hours, the division was ordered to withdraw towards Arras as a result of the German crossings of the canal. The 69th Brigade moved and took up position along the River Scarpe, northeast of Arras while the 8th Royal Northumberland Fusiliers (the division's motorcycle reconnaissance battalion) entered the town itself to reinforce the garrison. The 70th Brigade was to take up position southwest of the town along the Arras–Doullens road as far as Saulty. By daybreak on 20 May, only the 70th Brigade headquarters and parts of the 10th and 11th DLI were in position. The rest of the brigade was spread out to the south east. Some were waiting on the few trucks in use to ferry them to their intended positions. Others were marching west along the roads in open formation with wide intervals under a constant threat from the Luftwaffe. During this, the brigade was joined by men of the Ordnance Corps and AMPC, who were largely unarmed.

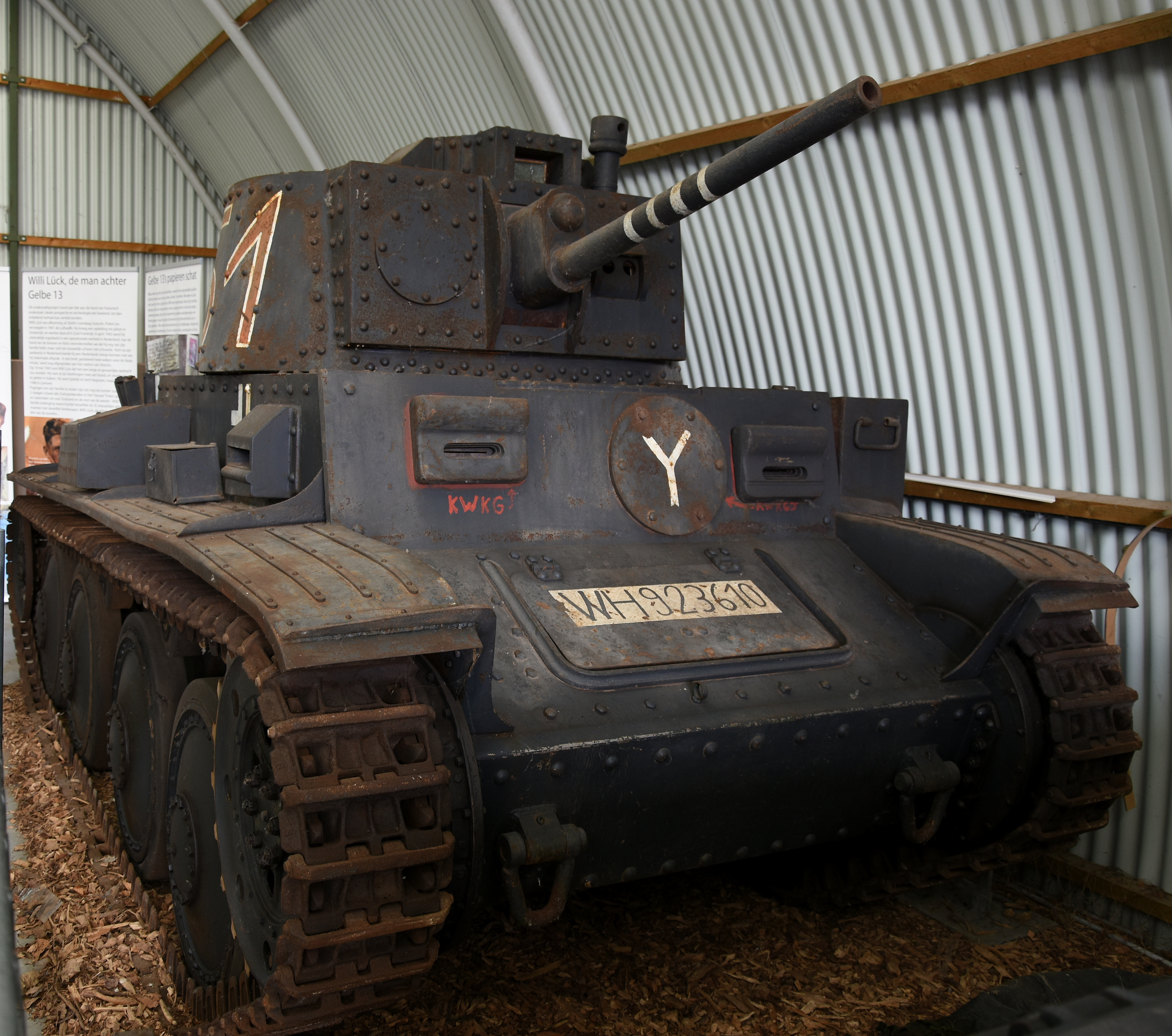
The Panzer 38(t), the primary tank of the 8th Panzer Division during the Battle of France.

What followed was a series of confused company actions fought by the 70th Brigade in and around the villages of Wancourt, Neuville-Vitasse, Mercatel and Ficheux. At 08:30 on 20 May, elements of the German 8th Panzer Division entered Wancourt and overran parts of the 11th DLI who were awaiting transport. Ill-equipped to engage tanks, these men were either killed or captured following the engagement that saw hand-to-hand fighting with the German panzergrenadiers. Between Neuville-Vitasse and Ficheux, the Tyneside Scottish were ambushed by the Germans. The battalion deployed on either side of the road. Company Sergeant-Major Baggs described "the boys fighting like hell with tanks all around them simply going over the men". Sustaining casualties from heavy flanking machine-gun fire, the battalion was unable to stop two German tanks, which moved up within 20 yards (18 m) of their positions and engaged the British troops with gun fire. Surrounded, the battalion surrendered. Baggs further described the scene: " ... our dead comrades [lay] all over the field on each side of the road. What a sacrifice!" Around 80 of the original 450 men managed to escape. On the western outskirts of Ficheux, B and C Companies of the 10th DLI were caught in the open along the road by German tanks and infantry. Both companies went to ground near the road and were engaged by three waves of German attacks, which included 22 tanks. While two tanks were put out of action, the two companies were eventually overwhelmed. The men of C Company were killed or captured in its entirety, while B Company was reduced to a platoon in strength. Later in the day, one company of the 11th DLI engaged German tanks and infantry at their old camp at Nuncq, before extracting themselves from the fight and retreating towards Abbeville. Unknown to these troops, the Germans had already captured the town and the retreating British troops were soon taken prisoner. What remained of the brigade retreated west to Houdain. That night it was only able to muster 233 officers and men including engineers picked up earlier in the day. Stragglers were rounded up by the 70th Brigade, which organised roughly 800 men of the 23rd Division into four rifle companies and turned them over to the 46th Division.

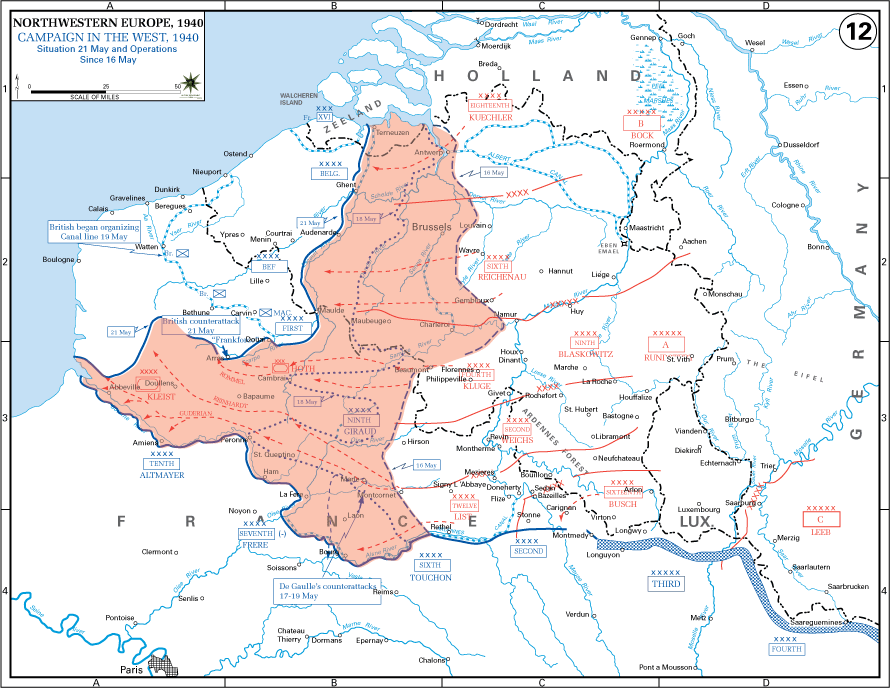
The German advance up to 21 May 1940

Ellis wrote that the "12th and 23rd Divisions ... had practically ceased to exist" as a result of the fighting that saw the "whole tract of country between the Scarpe and the Somme" fall into German hands, and "the British lines of communication ... finally cut; and the way to the Channel ports ... open". He continued: "It is a modest estimate of what these two Territorial divisions did to damage and delay the enemy's forces. But it may be perhaps accepted, with this important rider – at this time every single hour's delay was of incalculable service to the rest of the British Forces in France". David Fraser likewise wrote " ... these battalions, ill prepared, under-equipped and unsupported nevertheless on occasion held up the enemy for several hours".

Under mortar fire and with German troops on the opposite bank of the Scarpe, the 69th Brigade withdrew towards Farbus and Vimy Ridge, north of Arras. There, the brigade was issued with more machine guns, anti-tank rifles, and mortars although the level of training in their use was still inadequate. During the withdrawal, the brigade was attacked from the air and witnessed the Luftwaffe strafing refugee columns. Their stay at Vimy Ridge was short-lived due to the ongoing artillery fire, and the brigade moved closer to Arras taking up position at Roclincourt. The brigade could move no closer due to the heavy fighting ongoing around the town. Arras was now reinforced by the fully equipped 5th and 50th (Northumbrian) Divisions which subsequently launched a minor counter-attack. The remains of the 70th Brigade retreated to Lattre. Colonel David Marley, of the 10th DLI, began to collect and direct the remnants of the brigade. In the coming days this force became known as "Marley Force" and essentially replaced the destroyed 70th Brigade, Marley being treated as a brigadier by the division. This force withdrew to Hermaville, then onto Cambligneul by the 21st. Marley, out of contact with the division, drove to Arras to report to Petreforce HQ and was informed the 23rd Division was concentrating on the outskirts of Lille at Seclin. Transport was provided, and Marley Force made their move.

=== Retreat to Dunkirk ===
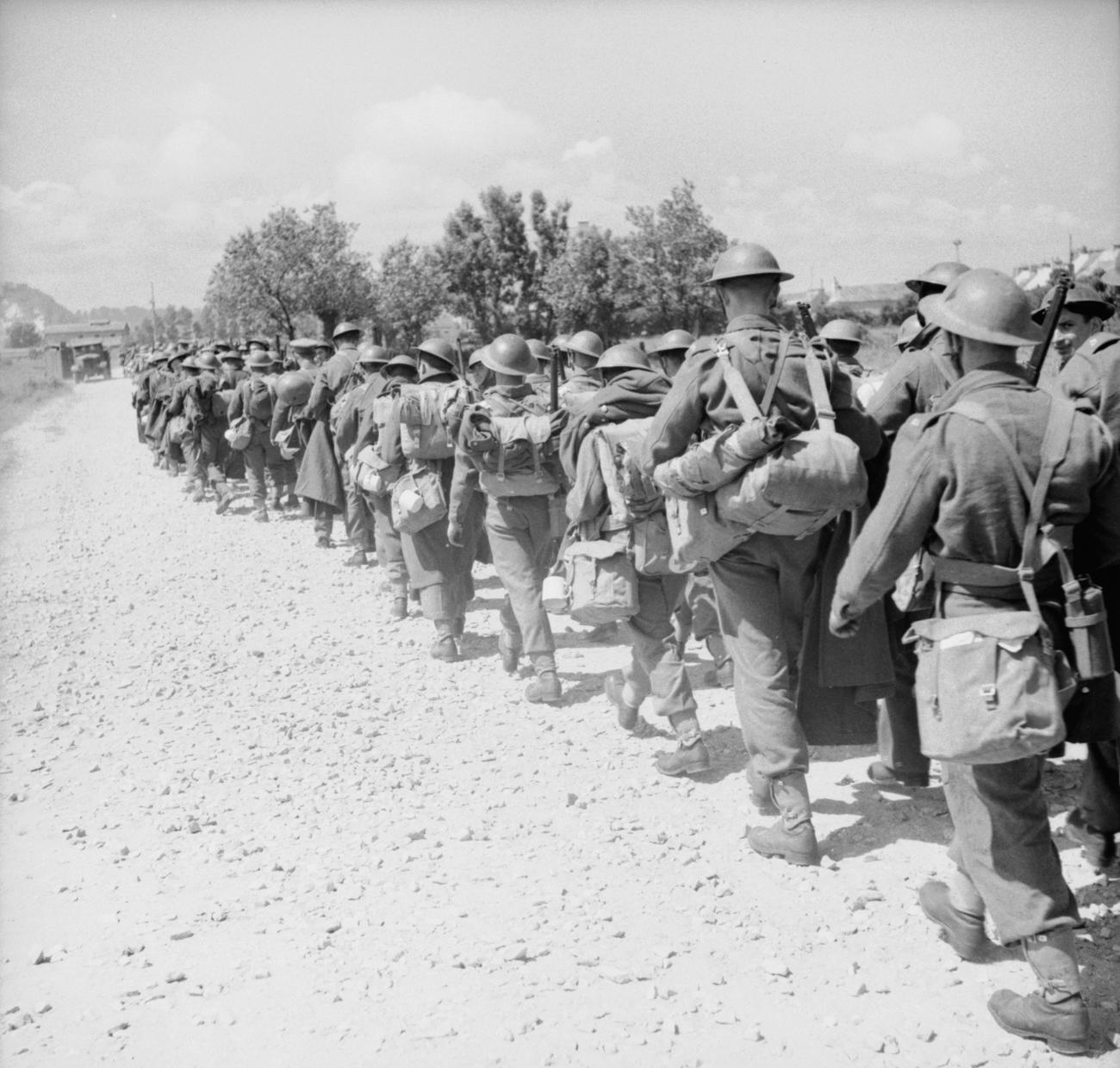
British troops retreating towards Dunkirk in June 1940.

During the 22nd and 23rd, appreciating the danger that the BEF was now in, Gort issued orders for several units to deploy to form a cordon around the BEF's line of retreat and to cover its rear from a potential strong German attack. The La Bassée Canal and the river Aa were the only defensible positions covering the BEF's southern and western flanks. Two fully equipped divisions were to take up position along this line, with whatever reinforcements Gort could muster. As part of the latter, Marley Force and the 69th Brigade were to take up positions along the canal with the intent to defend Watten, near St. Omer, and Gravelines on the coast. Marley Force departed their camp, escorted by armoured cars and light tanks, but were soon turned around on the orders of Herbert, with no reason provided. The 69th Brigade embarked on three-ton trucks and began a 70-mile (110 km) trek towards their position. Due to ongoing aerial bombardments that blocked the roads and inflicted casualties, only the 6th Green Howards managed to arrive at the brigade's destination. They were cut off from the rest of the brigade for the remainder of the campaign. At Gravelines, around 10 miles (16 km) east of besieged Calais, the battalion was supported by French troops. In this position, the Green Howards fended off several German attacks and knocked out two tanks. At Calais, the garrison was ordered to deliver rations to Dunkirk. To do so, four tanks were sent out to reconnoitre the road to Gravelines to see if it was open and could allow the rest of the garrison to follow. These tanks were fired on by the Green Howards, before they were recognised as British tanks, without inflicting damage or casualties. They represented the final elements of the British force in Calais to escape, before the German cordon was complete and the garrison surrendered. The tanks joined the defence, and the battalion continued to hold the area despite mounting casualties from German artillery and air attacks.

The collapsing Allied frontline, various lines show the retreat towards Dunkirk.

Over the following days, the Germans established bridgeheads over the river and canal and continued to press the BEF from all sides. On 26 May, with the BEF completely surrounded, and the military situation in Flanders further deteriorating, the decision was made to evacuate the BEF from Dunkirk, the only remaining port in British hands. With the evacuation order given, the remnants of the 23rd Division began withdrawing towards Dunkirk with the men always under the threat of or actual attack from the air. During this stage of the campaign, the division was assigned to III Corps for a 48-hour period, before being placed under II Corps for the remainder of the campaign. A detachment of 100 men formed a rearguard to defend bridges over the La Bassée Canal, resulting in their eventual death or capture. On the 28th, the division reached Killem Lynde, Marley Force having conducted further rearguard duties before being relieved by other British forces. Here, all remaining transport and unnecessary baggage was destroyed. On 30 May, the division entered the final Dunkirk perimeter and moved into a defensive position behind the 50th (Northumberland) Motor Division. Marley Force surrendered all their Bren guns to the 50th Division, and around 100 men from the 11th DLI went into the frontline to reinforce their sister battalion, the 8th DLI.

Meanwhile, the 6th Green Howards had continued to fend off German attacks at Gravelines until ordered to withdraw to Bergues. From Bergues, the battalion was sent to Haeghe-Muelen, 8 miles (13 km) south east of Dunkirk, to bolster the garrison composed of Irish and Welsh Guards protecting the right flank of the main withdrawal corridor to the port. Scavenging abandoned small arms, anti-tank rifles, and ammunition, the battalion held their position for a further 48 hours, suffering casualties and fending off German attacks. On 29 May, the battalion was ordered to hand over their Bren guns and ammunition to the Welsh Guards and retire to Dunkirk.

What was left of the division assembled on the beaches during the morning of 31 May. While some troops were picked up on the beaches of Dunkirk, the majority of the men were evacuated via the harbour's mole during the day. During the course of the campaign, the division suffered around 1,900 casualties.

=== Disbandment ===
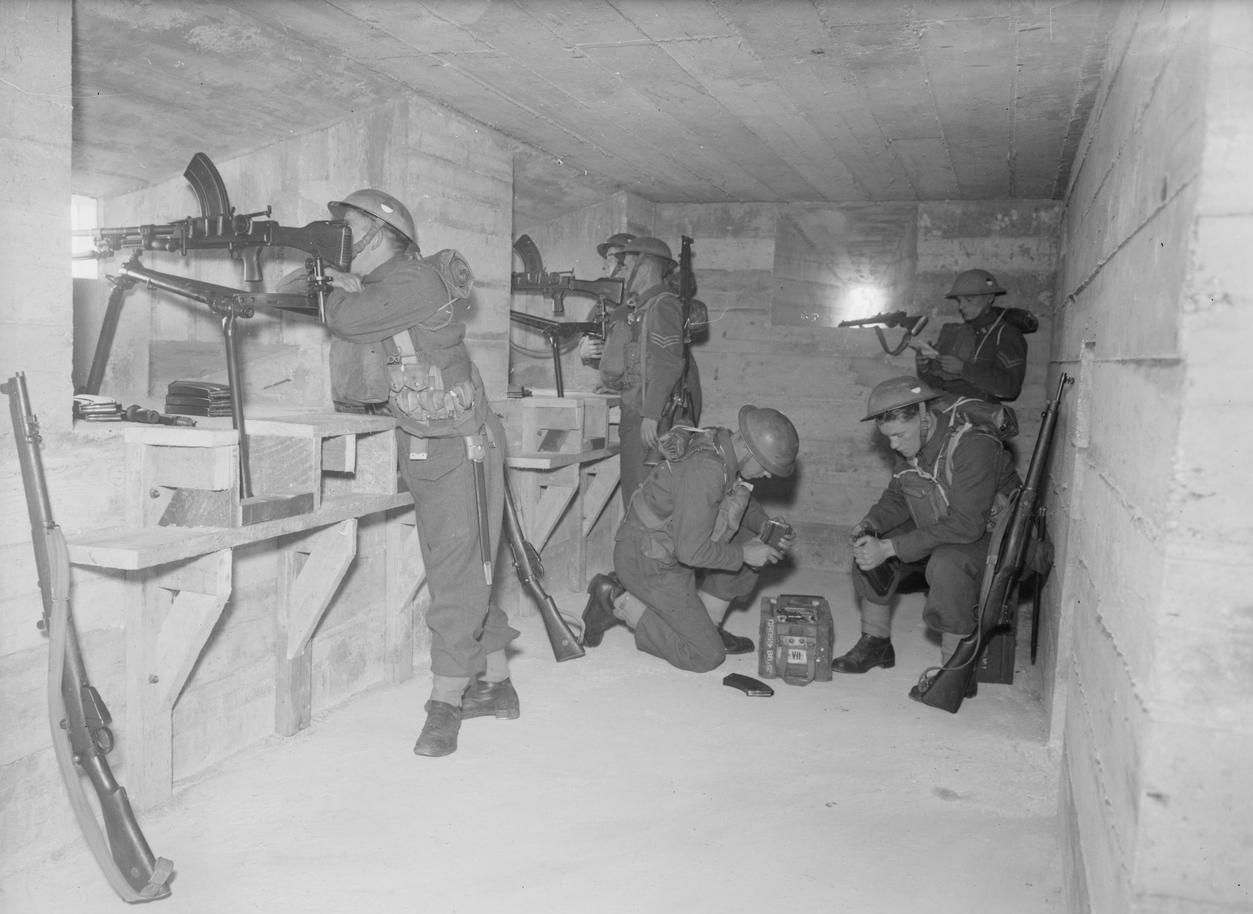
Men of the 7th Green Howards, 69th Brigade, on coastal defence duties following their transfer to the 50th Division

As soon as the troops returned from France, the British Army began implementing lessons learnt from the campaign. This involved the decision for the basic division to be based around three brigades. This process involved the break up of four second-line territorial divisions to reinforce depleted formations and aid in transforming the Army's five motor divisions (made up of two brigades) into infantry divisions (made up of three brigades). This included the disbanding of the 23rd Division, which occurred on 30 June, its units being dispersed. (Note: The 12th (Eastern) was disbanded on 11 July 1940, its brigades being dispersed to the following motor divisions as part of their transition to infantry formations: 1st London and 2nd London divisions. Its 37th Infantry Brigade became an independent brigade under II Corps. The 66th Infantry Division was disbanded on 23 June, its brigades being dispersed to the following motor divisions as part of their transition to infantry formations: 1st London, 55th (West Lancashire), and the 59th (Staffordshire) Motor Divisions. On 7 August, the 51st (Highland) Infantry Division was re-created by the re-designation of its second-line duplicate, the 9th (Highland) Infantry Division.)

Specifically, the 69th Infantry Brigade (along with the 233rd Field Company, RE, and the 124th Field Regiment, RA) was transferred to the division's first-line counterpart, the 50th (Northumberland) Motor Division to finalise its re-organisation into an infantry division. These units, as part of the 50th (Northumberland) Infantry Division, would go on to fight in the North African Campaign, the Allied invasion of Sicily, and the North West Europe Campaign including Operation Overlord. The 70th Brigade was used to reinforce "Alabaster Force", the British force sent to occupy Iceland. This force was based around the 49th (West Riding) Infantry Division, which had been reduced to two brigades prior to its deployment. On 18 May 1942, the 70th Brigade officially became part of that division and subsequently fought in Normandy. The 8th Royal Northumberland Fusiliers became the 3rd Reconnaissance Regiment, Reconnaissance Corps and served in the 3rd Infantry Division until the end of the war, fighting in North West Europe. The 507th Field Company, RE were assigned to the 148th Independent Brigade Group. (Note: The brigade group was an element of the post-Dunkirk reforms that saw the Army move away from the "division" as the basic tactical unit, and restructured divisions around three flexible "brigade groups". Each brigade would have all required supporting arms including machine guns, artillery, and an entire engineer field company.)

== Order of battle ==
23rd (Northumbrian) Division (1939–40)

69th Infantry Brigade

- 5th Battalion, East Yorkshire Regiment
- 6th Battalion, Green Howards
- 7th Battalion, Green Howards

70th Infantry Brigade

- 10th Battalion, Durham Light Infantry
- 11th Battalion, Durham Light Infantry
- 12th (Tyneside Scottish) Battalion, Durham Light Infantry (Became the 1st Battalion, Tyneside Scottish, Black Watch (Royal Highland Regiment) on 1 February 1940)

Divisional Troops

- 23rd (Northumbrian) Divisional artillery, Royal Artillery
  - 124th Field Regiment
  - 125th Field Regiment
  - 'A' (An ad hoc formation established on 17 May from details allocated by BEF)
- 23rd (Northumbrian) Divisional Engineers, Royal Engineers
  - 233rd (Northumbrian) Field Company
  - 507th Field Company
  - 508th Field Park Company
- 23rd (Northumbrian) Divisional Signals, Royal Corps of Signals
- 8th Battalion, Royal Northumberland Fusiliers (Motorcycle battalion)
- 9th Battalion, Royal Northumberland Fusiliers (A Machine Gun battalion placed under the command for training and labor duties, but not a divisional asset)

== See also ==
- List of British divisions in World War II
- British Army Order of Battle (September 1939)
