= 151st (Durham Light Infantry) Brigade =

Durham Light Infantry Brigade 151st (Durham Light Infantry) Brigade
- Active: 1902–1919
- Country: United Kingdom
- Branch: Territorial Army
- Type: Infantry
- Size: Brigade
- Part of: 50th (Northumbrian) Division
- Engagements: Second Battle of Ypres; Battle of the Somme; Battle of Arras; German spring offensive Battle of the Lys; Third Battle of the Aisne; Hundred Days Offensive

The Durham Light Infantry Brigade was formed in 1902 to command the part-time Volunteer battalions of the Durham Light Infantry (DLI). Previously these had been in a combined Tyne and Tees Brigade with battalions of the Northumberland Fusiliers. It consisted of the 1st–4th Volunteer Battalions of the DLI (the 5th VB had remained in the Tyne Brigade), which were renumbered as the 5th–8th Battalions when the Volunteers were subsumed into the Territorial Force (TF) under the Haldane Reforms of 1908. Consisting of 6th–9th Battalions (the 5th Bn joined the York and Durham Brigade), it became part of the TF's Northumbrian Division. During World War I it was numbered as the 151st (Durham Light Infantry) Brigade on 14 May 1915, when the division became the 50th (Northumbrian) Division. The TF also raised 2nd Line units and formations, and the 190th (2nd Durham Light Infantry) Brigade was formed in 63rd (2nd Northumbrian) Division. The 1st Line battalions adopted the prefix '1/'

== Order of Battle ==
The brigade's composition during World War I was as follows:

- 1/6th Battalion, Durham Light Infantry – reduced to training cadre 15 July 1918
- 1/7th Battalion, Durham Light Infantry – left on 16 November 1915 to become the divisional pioneer battalion
- 1/8th Battalion, Durham Light Infantry – reduced to training cadre 15 July 1918
- 1/9th Battalion, Durham Light Infantry – left 13 February 1918
- 1/5th Battalion, Loyal North Lancashire Regiment – joined 11 June 1915, left 21 December 1915
- 1/5th Battalion, Border Regiment – joined from 149th (Northumberland) Brigade 20 December 1915; left 13 February 1918
- 1/5th Battalion, Durham Light Infantry – joined from 150th (York and Durham) Brigade12 February 1918; reduced to training cadre 15 July 1918
- 151st Machine Gun Company – formed 6 February 1916; transferred to divisional Machine Gun Battalion 1 March 1918
- 151st Trench Mortar Battery – formed June 1916

After the Third Battle of the Aisne, the 50th Division was reduced to training cadres. The 151st Brigade was then reconstituted with battalions withdrawn from Salonika, giving it the following composition:

- 6th Battalion, Royal Inniskilling Fusiliers
- 1st Battalion, King's Own Yorkshire Light Infantry
- 4th Battalion, King's Royal Rifle Corps
- 151st Trench Mortar Battery

After the Armistice with Germany, 50th Division was disbanded in France on 19 March 1919. The old Northumbrian Division was reconstituted in April 1920.

== Actions ==
The brigade fought in the following actions during World War I:

- Second Battle of Ypres
  - Battle of St Julien (24 April – 3 May 1915)
  - Battle of Frezenberg Ridge (11–13 May 1915)
  - Battle of Bellewaarde Ridge (24–25 May 1915)
- Battle of the Somme
  - Battle of Flers-Courcelette (15–22 September 1916)
  - Battle of Morval (25–28 September 1916)
  - Battle of the Transloy Ridges (1–3 October 1916)
- Battle of Arras
  - First Battle of the Scarpe (11–14 April 1917)
  - Capture of Wancourt Ridge (13–15 April 1917)
  - Second Battle of the Scarpe (23–24 April 1917)
- Third Battle of Ypres
  - Second Battle of Passchendaele (26 October – 9 November 1917)
- Battles of the Somme
  - Battle of St Quentin (21–23 March 1918)
  - Actions at the Somme Crossings (23 March 1918)
  - Battle of Rosieres (26–27 March 1918)
- Battle of the Lys
  - Battle of Estaires (9–11 April 1918)
  - Battle of Hazebrouck (12 April 1918)
- Third Battle of the Aisne (27 May – 6 June 1918)
- Battles of the Hindenburg Line
  - Battle of the St Quentin Canal (1 October 1918)
  - Battle of the Beaurevoir Line(3–5 October 1918)
  - Battle of Cambrai (8 October 1918)
  - Pursuit to the Selle (11–12 October 1918)
- Final Advance in Picardy
  - Battle of the Selle (17–18 October 1918)
  - Battle of the Sambre (4 November 1918)

== Commanders ==
The following officers commanded the brigade during World War I:

- Col (Brig-Gen from 5 August 1914) J.W. Sears, appointed 30 March 1913, till 16 December 1914
- Brig-Gen H. Martin, till 4 July 1915
- Brig-Gen J.S.M. Shea, till 17 May 1916
- Brig-Gen P.T. Westmorland, till 6 September 1916
- Brig-Gen N.J.G. Cameron, till 20 October 1917
- Brig-Gen C.T. Martin, killed 27 May 1918
- Lt-Col F. Walton, acting
- Brig-Gen R.E. Sugden, from 7 June 1918

== External sources ==
- The Long, Long Trail
- The Regimental Warpath 1914–1918 (archive site)
