= 189th (2nd York and Durham) Brigade =

Military unit

The 189th (2nd York and Durham) Brigade was a formation of the British Army during the First World War. It was raised as a second line brigade, part of the 63rd (2nd Northumbrian) Division, from those men in the Territorial Force who had not agreed to serve overseas. The second line infantry battalions had a minimum strength of 600 men. The brigade was disbanded in November 1916.

== Order of Battle ==
- 2/4th Battalion, East Yorkshire Regiment
- 2/4th Battalion, Yorkshire Regiment
- 2/5th Battalion, Yorkshire Regiment
- 2/5th Battalion, Durham Light Infantry
