= British infantry brigades of the First World War =

During the First World War, 259 infantry brigades were raised by the British Army, two by the Royal Navy, and one from the Royal Marines. Of these brigades, fifty-three were held in reserve or only used for training, while another nine only served in British India.

The pre war regular army only had eighteen infantry brigades, with another forty-five serving with the reserve Territorial Force (TF). Once war was declared, the regular army was expanded first by volunteers and then conscripts for what became known as Kitchener's Army. At the same time, volunteers for the TF formed second line formations.

Three infantry brigades served with a division, mostly the same one throughout the war, but some did serve for short periods with another division. At the start of the war, four infantry battalions along with a small headquarters formed a brigade; but, by 1918, with the number of casualties mounting, the brigade was reduced to three battalions. During the same time, the firepower of a brigade was increased by the assignment of more machine guns. Eventually, as the war progressed, a brigade had its own machine gun company and a trench mortar battery assigned.

== Background ==
At the outbreak of the war in August 1914, the British regular army was a small professional force. It consisted of 247,432 regular troops organised into four Guards, 69 line infantry and 31 cavalry regiments, along with artillery and other support arms. The regular Army was supported by the Territorial Force, and by reservists. In August 1914, there were three forms of reserves. The Army Reserve of retired soldiers was 145,350 strong. The Special Reserve had another 64,000 men and was a form of part-time soldiering, similar to the Territorial Force. The National Reserve had some 215,000 men, who were on a register which was maintained by Territorial Force County Associations; these men had military experience, but no other reserve obligation. The regulars and reserves—at least on paper—totalled a mobilised force of almost 700,000 men, although only 150,000 men were immediately available to be formed into the British Expeditionary Force.

=== Pre war regular army ===
After 1907, the regular British Army, serving at home, was grouped into six divisions, each of three brigades numbered 1st–18th. Following the declaration of war, four infantry battalions, which had been intended to defend the lines of communication, were brigaded together as the 19th Brigade. Near the end of 1914, when regular army battalions returned to Europe from serving around the British Empire, they formed the 7th and 8th Division, with the 20th–25th brigades. As the war progressed, three more regular army divisions were formed the 27th, 28th and 29th, with their brigades being numbered from 80th–88th.

=== Territorial Force ===
The reserve formations of the Territorial Force comprised fourteen divisions, each of three brigades, while another three brigades were independent formations intended for coastal defence. They were unnumbered until August 1915, and took the name of the region with which they were affiliated, or the name of the regiments that supplied their battalions. When the brigades were given numbers, they became the 125th–234th brigades. As a home defence organisation, their men could not be sent overseas against their wishes. After war was declared, almost to a man the Territorial Force volunteered to serve overseas, so a second line Territorial Force was recruited, virtually a mirror image of the first line divisions and brigades. For example, the Northumbrian Division, had the Northumberland, York and Durham and the Durham Light Infantry Brigades. The second line 2nd Northumbrian Division, had the 2nd Northumberland, 2nd York and Durham and the 2nd Durham Light Infantry Brigades. Volunteers for the second line Territorial Force had the same terms and conditions as the first line, and could not be sent overseas unless they agreed to do so. (Note: Until the passing of the Military Service Act 1916.)

=== Kitchener's Army ===
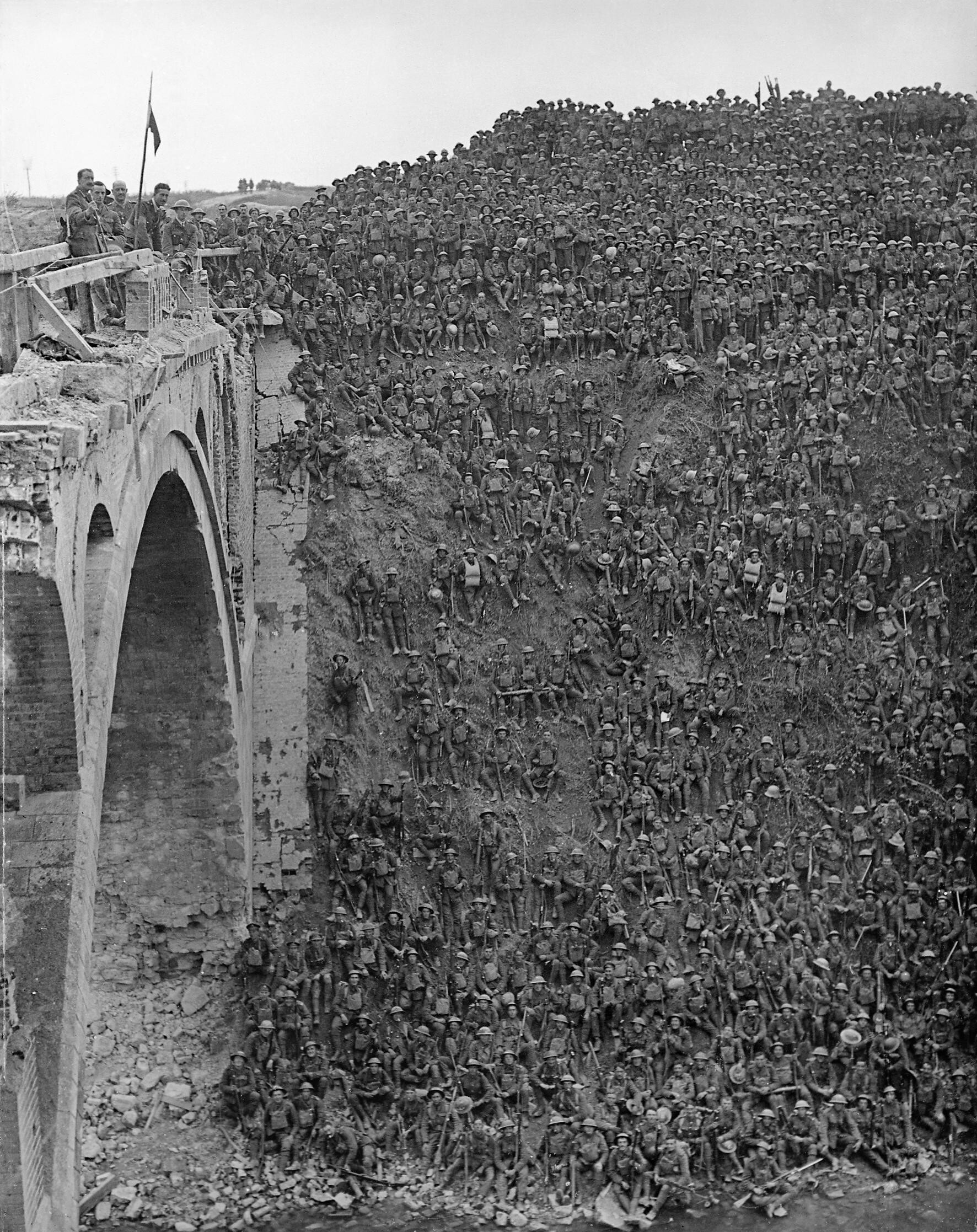
The British 137th Brigade muster on 29 September 1918 shortly after breaking through the German's Hindenburg Line. The image was taken at the Riqueval Bridge - across the Saint-Quentin Canal - south of Bellicourt in northern France.

The third part of the British Army was the New Army, also known as Kitchener's Army. Recruits for the New Armies were technically part of the regular army, serving for three years or until the end of the war. The first of the New Armies comprised the 9th–14th divisions, with the 26th–43rd brigades. The second New Army comprised the 15th–20th divisions, with the 44th–61st brigades. The third comprised the 21st–26th divisions, with the 62nd–79th brigades. The fourth and fifth were the Pals battalions of the 30th–35th divisions, with the 89th–106th brigades and the 37th–42nd divisions, with the 110th–136th brigades. The last New Army was the sixth, comprising the 36th–41st divisions, with the 107th–124th brigades.

=== Infantry brigade composition ===
At the start of the First World War French, Russian and German divisions consisted of two brigades each of which were made up of two regiments. Each regiment had three battalions, except the Russians which had four, which meant that in total there were around 6,000 men in the brigade. The British Army was different. Its divisions consisted of three brigades, with each brigade having slightly over 4,000 men in four battalions, plus support troops, under the command of a brigadier general.

The 1914 British infantry brigade comprised a small headquarters and four infantry battalions, with two heavy machine guns per battalion. Over the course of the war, the composition of the infantry brigades gradually changed, and there was an increased emphasis upon providing them with their own organic fire support. By 1916, each brigade had a Vickers machine gun company and a mortar battery with eight Stokes Mortars. The machine gun companies were later withdrawn and combined into a divisional machine gun battalion. By 1918, the brigade formation had been reduced to three battalions. However, each battalion now had thirty-six Lewis machine guns, making a total of 108 in the brigade.

Several brigades that served away from the Western Front and other main theatres of operations, had a different composition. The 228th Brigade, which served with the command of the Greek Crete Division, had a Royal Engineers signal section and a Royal Army Medical Corps field ambulance attached. Other brigades that served in the British Salonika Army, had a Section Ammunition Column attached. Brigades that served in the Mesopotamia Campaign had their own supply and transport columns of the Army Service Corps. One brigade, the 226th Mixed, was unique in the respect that it was the only infantry brigade with its own artillery, having two batteries from the Royal Garrison Artillery assigned.

In the trench warfare on the Western Front, an infantry brigade's defensive responsibilities depended upon where they were at the time. On 21 March 1918, the first day of the German spring offensive, the 173rd Brigade was responsible for 5,000 yards (4,600 m) of the front line. In 1918, the British Army was responsible for 126 miles (203 km) of the Western Front. The forty-two brigades, fourteen divisions, of the First Army had to defend 33 miles (53 km). The thirty-six brigades, twelve divisions, of the Second Army 23 miles (37 km). The forty-two brigades, fourteen divisions, of the Third Army 28 miles (45 km). The thirty-six brigades, twelve divisions, of the Fifth Army possibly had the hardest task with 42 miles (68 km) of front to defend.

Within the brigade a typical deployment was one battalion in the front line, with the other two in reserve, about 2 to 3 miles (3.2 to 4.8 km) back. The forward battalion had several sections manning outposts in the front trench with two companies manning strong points behind them. The third company was in reserve to act as a counter-attacking force and the fourth company was resting. Two brigades of a division would be deployed forward with the third brigade in reserve.

== List of brigades ==
Brigade	Superior HQ	First arrived at the front	Location	Notes
1st Guards Brigade	Guards Division	August 1915	Western Front	Formed by redesignation of 4th (Guards) Brigade after transferring complete from the 1st Division to the Guards Division.
1st (Guards) Brigade	1st Division	August 1914	Western Front	Prewar Regular Army formation. Redesignated 1st Brigade after the Guards battalions left for the Guards Division.
1st Brigade	1st Division	August 1915	Western Front	Formed by redesignation of 1st (Guards) Brigade after the Guards battalions left for the Guards Division.
1st (Royal Naval) Brigade	63rd (Royal Naval) Division	October 1914	Western Front	Formed from Royal Navy reservists. Re-designated 1st Brigade in August 1915, then disbanded July 1916.
1st Provisional Brigade	Southern Army		Home service	Formed from Home Service men of Territorials, attached to 67th (2nd Home Counties) Division. Became 221st Mixed Brigade.
1st Reserve Brigade	Northern Command		Home service	Converted from original 89th Brigade
2/1st London Brigade	58th (2/1st London) Division	December 1914	Malta	Left the Division for Malta.
2nd Guards Brigade	Guards Division	August 1915	Western Front	Formed from the Regular Army.
2nd Brigade	1st Division	August 1914	Western Front	Prewar Regular Army formation.
2nd (Royal Naval) Brigade	63rd (Royal Naval) Division	October 1914	Western Front	Formed from Royal Navy reservists. Broken up July 1915, and reformed August 1915 as 2nd Brigade. Renamed the 2nd (Royal Naval) Brigade and then 189th Brigade July 1916.
2nd Provisional Brigade	Southern Army; Eastern Command		Home service	Formed from Home Service men of Territorials. Became 222nd Mixed Brigade.
2nd Reserve Brigade	Northern Command		Home service	Converted from original 90th Brigade
3rd Guards Brigade	Guards Division	August 1915	Western Front	Formed from the Regular Army.
3rd Brigade	1st Division	August 1914	Western Front	Prewar Regular Army formation.
3rd (Royal Marine) Brigade	63rd (Royal Naval) Division	August 1914	Western Front	Formed from surplus Royal Marine reserves, with no berths on ships available. Disbanded August 1915, until May 1916. Re-designated 1st (Royal Naval) Brigade and 188th Brigade in July 1916.
3rd Provisional Brigade	Northern Army		Home service	Formed from Home Service men of Territorials, attached to 69th (2nd East Anglian) Division. Became 223rd Mixed Brigade.
3rd Reserve Brigade	Northern Command		Home service	Converted from original 91st Brigade
4th (Guards) Brigade	2nd Division	August 1914	Western Front	Prewar Regular Army formation. Renumbered 1st Guards Brigade August 1915.
4th Guards Brigade	31st Division	February 1918	Western Front	Formed from three battalions of the Guards Division when divisions on the Western Front were reduced from twelve to nine battalions.
4th Provisional Brigade	Northern Army		Home service	Formed from Home Service men of Territorials, attached to 64th (2nd Highland) Division. Became 224th Mixed Brigade.
4th Reserve Brigade	Eastern Command		Home service	Converted from original 92nd Brigade
5th Brigade	2nd Division	August 1914	Western Front	Prewar Regular Army formation.
5th Provisional Brigade	Northern Army		Home service	Formed from Home Service men of Territorials. Became 225th Mixed Brigade.
5th Reserve Brigade	Eastern Command		Home service	Converted from original 93rd Brigade
6th Brigade	2nd Division	August 1914	Western Front	Prewar Regular Army formation.
6th Provisional Brigade	Northern Army		Home service	Formed from Home Service men of Territorials. Became 71st Division.
6th Reserve Brigade	Eastern Command		Home service	Converted from original 94th Brigade
7th Brigade	3rd Division; 25th Division	August 1914	Western Front	Prewar Regular Army formation. Joined 25th Division October 1915.
7th Provisional Brigade	Southern Army		Home service	Formed from Home Service men of Territorials. Became 226th Mixed Brigade.
7th Reserve Brigade	Eastern Command		Home service	Converted from original 95th Brigade
8th Brigade	3rd Division	August 1914	Western Front	Prewar Regular Army formation.
8th Provisional Brigade	Northern Army		Home service	Formed from Home Service men of Territorials. Became 72nd Division.
8th Reserve Brigade	Southern Command		Home service	Converted from original 96th Brigade
9th Brigade	3rd Division; 28th Division	August 1914	Western Front	Prewar Regular Army formation. Attached to 28th Division between February and April 1915.
9th Provisional Brigade	Southern Army		Home service	Formed from Home Service men of Territorials. Became 73rd Division.
9th Reserve Brigade	Scottish Command		Home service	Converted from original 97th Brigade
10th Brigade	4th Division	August 1914	Western Front	Prewar Regular Army formation.
10th Provisional Brigade	Southern Army		Home service	Formed from Home Service men of Territorials. Became 227th Mixed Brigade.
10th Reserve Brigade	Eastern Command		Home service	Converted from original 98th Brigade
11th Brigade	4th Division	August 1914	Western Front	Prewar Regular Army formation.
11th Reserve Brigade	Western Command		Home service	Converted from original 99th Brigade
12th Brigade	4th Division; 36th (Ulster)	August 1914	Western Front	Prewar Regular Army formation. Attached to 36th (Ulster) Division between November 1915 and February 1916.
12th Reserve Brigade	Scottish Command		Home service	Converted from original 100th Brigade
13th Brigade	5th Division	August 1914	Western Front	Prewar Regular Army formation. Attached to 28th Division between February 1915 and April 1915. Also fought in the Italian Campaign.
13th Reserve Brigade	Western Command		Home service	Converted from original 101st Brigade
14th Brigade	5th Division; 32nd Division	August 1914	Western Front	Prewar Regular Army formation. Transferred to 32nd Division December 1915.
14th Reserve Brigade	Western Command		Home service	Converted from original 102nd Brigade
15th Brigade	5th Division	August 1914	Western Front	Prewar Regular Army formation. Attached to 28th Division between March and April 1915. Also fought in the Italian Campaign.
15th Reserve Brigade	Irish Command		Home service	Converted from original 103rd Brigade
16th Brigade	6th Division	August 1914	Western Front	Prewar Regular Army formation.
16th Reserve Brigade	Western Command		Home service	Converted from original 104th Brigade
17th Brigade	6th Division; 24th Division	August 1914	Western Front	Prewar Regular Army formation. Transferred to 24th Division October 1915.
17th Reserve Brigade	Western Command		Home service	Converted from original 105th Brigade
18th Brigade	6th Division	August 1914	Western Front	Prewar Regular Army formation.
18th Reserve Brigade	Scottish Command		Home service	Converted from original 106th Brigade
19th Brigade	6th Division; 27th Division; 2nd Division; 33rd Division	August 1914	Western Front	Formed from Army Troops of the BEF. GHQ Troops until October 1914, joined 27th Division May 1915. Transferred to 2nd Division August 1915, then 33rd Division November 1915.
19th Reserve Brigade	Northern Command		Home service	
20th Brigade	7th Division	October 1914	Western Front	Formed from the Regular Army. Also fought in the Italian Campaign.
20th Reserve Brigade	Northern Command		Home service	
21st Brigade	7th Division; 30th Division	October 1914	Western Front	Formed from the Regular Army. Transferred to 30th Division December 1915
21st Reserve Brigade	Northern Command		Home service	
22nd Brigade	7th Division	October 1914	Western Front	Formed from the Regular Army. Also fought in the Italian Campaign.
22nd Reserve Brigade	Southern Command		Home service	
23rd Brigade	8th Division	November 1914	Western Front	Formed from the Regular Army.
23rd Reserve Brigade	Eastern Command		Home service	
24th Brigade	8th Division; 23rd Division	November 1914	Western Front	Formed from the Regular Army. Transferred to 23rd Division October 1916 to July 1916.
24th Reserve Brigade	Eastern Command		Home service	
25th Brigade	8th Division	November 1914	Western Front	Formed from the Regular Army.
25th (Irish) Reserve Brigade	Irish Command		Home service	
26th Brigade	9th (Scottish) Division	May 1915	Western Front	Kitchener's Army brigade.
26th Reserve Brigade	London District		Home service	
27th Brigade	9th (Scottish) Division	May 1915	Western Front	Kitchener's Army brigade.
28th Brigade	9th (Scottish) Division	May 1915	Western Front	Kitchener's Army brigade. Disbanded May 1916 reformed September 1918.
28th Reserve Brigade			Home service	
29th Brigade	10th (Irish) Division	August 1915	Gallipoli campaign	Kitchener's Army brigade. Also fought on the Macedonian Front and in the Sinai and Palestine Campaign.
30th Brigade	10th (Irish) Division	August 1915	Gallipoli Campaign	Kitchener's Army brigade. Also fought on the Macedonian Front and in the Sinai and Palestine Campaign.
31st Brigade	10th (Irish) Division	August 1915	Gallipoli Campaign	Kitchener's Army brigade. Also fought on the Macedonian Front and in the Sinai and Palestine Campaign.
32nd Brigade	11th (Northern) Division	August 1915	Gallipoli Campaign	Kitchener's Army brigade. Also fought on the Western Front.
33rd Brigade	11th (Northern) Division; 2nd Division	August 1915	Gallipoli campaign	Kitchener's Army brigade. Transferred to 2nd Division November 1915. Also fought on the Western Front.
34th Brigade	11th (Northern) Division	August 1915	Gallipoli campaign	Kitchener's Army brigade. Also fought on the Western Front.
35th Brigade	12th (Eastern) Division	May 1915	Western Front	Kitchener's Army brigade.
36th Brigade	12th (Eastern) Division	May 1915	Western Front	Kitchener's Army brigade.
37th Brigade	12th (Eastern) Division	May 1915	Western Front	Kitchener's Army brigade.
38th Brigade	13th (Western) Division	June 1915	Gallipoli campaign	Kitchener's Army brigade. Also fought in the Mesopotamia Campaign.
39th Brigade	13th (Western) Division	June 1915	Gallipoli campaign	Kitchener's Army brigade. Also fought in the Mesopotamia Campaign. Attached Dunsterforce 1918.
40th Brigade	13th (Western) Division	June 1915	Gallipoli campaign	Kitchener's Army brigade. Also fought in the Mesopotamia Campaign.
41st Brigade	14th (Light) Division	May 1915	Western Front	Kitchener's Army brigade.
42nd Brigade	14th (Light) Division	May 1915	Western Front	Kitchener's Army brigade.
43rd Brigade	14th (Light) Division	May 1915	Western Front	Kitchener's Army brigade. Formed from Light Infantry battalions.
44th Brigade	15th (Scottish) Division	July 1915	Western Front	Kitchener's Army brigade.
45th Brigade	15th (Scottish) Division	July 1915	Western Front	Kitchener's Army brigade.
46th Brigade	15th (Scottish) Division	July 1915	Western Front	Kitchener's Army brigade.
47th Brigade	16th (Irish) Division	December 1915	Western Front	Kitchener's Army brigade.
48th Brigade	16th (Irish) Division	December 1915	Western Front	Kitchener's Army brigade.
49th Brigade	16th (Irish) Division	December 1915	Western Front	Kitchener's Army brigade.
50th Brigade	17th (Northern) Division	July 1915	Western Front	Kitchener's Army brigade.
51st Brigade	17th (Northern) Division	July 1915	Western Front	Kitchener's Army brigade.
52nd Brigade	17th (Northern) Division	July 1915	Western Front	Kitchener's Army brigade.
53rd Brigade	18th (Eastern) Division	July 1915	Western Front	Kitchener's Army brigade.
54th Brigade	18th (Eastern) Division	July 1915	Western Front	Kitchener's Army brigade.
55th Brigade	18th (Eastern) Division	July 1915	Western Front	Kitchener's Army brigade.
56th Brigade	19th (Western) Division	July 1915	Western Front	Kitchener's Army brigade.
57th Brigade	19th (Western) Division	July 1915	Western Front	Kitchener's Army brigade.
58th Brigade	19th (Western) Division	July 1915	Western Front	Kitchener's Army brigade.
59th Brigade	20th (Light) Division	July 1915	Western Front	Kitchener's Army brigade.
60th Brigade	20th (Light) Division	July 1915	Western Front	Kitchener's Army brigade.
61st Brigade	20th (Light) Division	July 1915	Western Front	Kitchener's Army brigade. Formed from Light Infantry battalions.
62nd Brigade	21st Division	September 1915	Western Front	Kitchener's Army brigade.
63rd Brigade	21st Division; 37th Division	September 1915	Western Front	Kitchener's Army brigade. Transferred to the 37th Division July 1916.
64th Brigade	21st Division	September 1915	Western Front	Kitchener's Army brigade.
65th Brigade	22nd Division	September 1915	Western Front	Kitchener's Army brigade. Also fought on the Macedonian Front.
66th Brigade	22nd Division	September 1915	Western Front	Kitchener's Army brigade. Also fought on the Macedonian Front.
67th Brigade	22nd Division	September 1915	Western Front	Kitchener's Army brigade. Also fought on the Macedonian Front.
68th Brigade	23rd Division	August 1915	Western Front	Kitchener's Army brigade. Also fought in the Italian Campaign.
69th Brigade	23rd Division	August 1915	Western Front	Kitchener's Army brigade. Also fought in the Italian Campaign.
70th Brigade	23rd Division; 8th Division	August 1915	Western Front	Kitchener's Army brigade. Also fought in the Italian Campaign. Transferred to 8th Division October 1915 to July 1916.
71st Brigade	24th Division; 6th Division	September 1915	Western Front	Kitchener's Army brigade. Transferred to 6th Division October 1915.
72nd Brigade	24th Division	September 1915	Western Front	Kitchener's Army brigade.
73rd Brigade	24th Division	September 1915	Western Front	Kitchener's Army brigade.
74th Brigade	25th Division	September 1915	Western Front	Kitchener's Army brigade.
75th Brigade	25th Division	September 1915	Western Front	Kitchener's Army brigade. Renumbered as 236th Brigade and new 75th Brigade formed September 1918.
76th Brigade	25th Division; 3rd Division	September 1915	Western Front	Kitchener's Army brigade. Joined 3rd Division October 1915
77th Brigade	26th Division	September 1915	Western Front	Kitchener's Army brigade. Also fought on the Macedonian Front.
78th Brigade	26th Division	September 1915	Western Front	Kitchener's Army brigade. Also fought on the Macedonian Front.
79th Brigade	26th Division	September 1915	Western Front	Kitchener's Army brigade. Also fought on the Macedonian Front.
80th Brigade	27th Division	December 1914	Western Front	Formed from the Regular Army. Also fought on the Macedonian Front.
81st Brigade	27th Division	December 1914	Western Front	Formed from the Regular Army. Also fought on the Macedonian Front.
82nd Brigade	27th Division	December 1914	Western Front	Formed from the Regular Army. Also fought on the Macedonian Front.
83rd Brigade	28th Division; 5th Division	January 1915	Western Front	Formed from the Regular Army. Transferred to 5th Division between March and April 1915. Also fought on the Macedonian Front.
84th Brigade	28th Division; 5th Division	January 1915	Western Front	Formed from the Regular Army. Transferred to 5th Division between February and April 1915. Also fought on the Macedonian Front.
85th Brigade	28th Division; 3rd Division	January 1915	Western Front	Formed from the Regular Army. Transferred to 3rd Division between February and April 1915. Also fought on the Macedonian Front.
86th Brigade	29th Division	April 1915	Gallipoli campaign	Formed from the Regular Army. Also fought in the Sinai and Palestine Campaign and on the Western Front.
87th Brigade	29th Division	April 1915	Gallipoli campaign	Formed from the Regular Army. Also fought in the Sinai and Palestine Campaign and on the Western Front.
88th Brigade	29th Division	April 1915	Gallipoli Campaign	Formed from the Regular Army. Also fought in the Sinai and Palestine Campaign and on the Western Front.
89th Brigade	30th Division	November 1915	Western Front	Kitchener's Army brigade. Formed from King's (Liverpool Regiment) battalions.
90th Brigade	30th Division	November 1915	Western Front	Kitchener's Army brigade. Formed from Manchester Regiment battalions.
91st Brigade	30th Division; 7th Division	November 1915	Western Front	Kitchener's Army brigade. Formed from Manchester Regiment battalions. Also fought in the Italian Campaign. Transferred to 7th Division December 1915
92nd Brigade	31st Division	December 1915	Egypt, Western Front	Kitchener's Army brigade, formed from East Yorkshire Regiment battalions. Following heavy casualties in April 1918 the 92nd and 93rd Brigades were amalgamated as the 92nd Composite Brigade. However they were reformed soon after.
93rd Brigade	31st Division	December 1915	Egypt, Western Front	Kitchener's Army brigade. Following heavy casualties in April 1918 the 92nd and 93rd Brigades were amalgamated as the 92nd Composite Brigade. However they were reformed soon after.
94th Brigade	31st Division	December 1915	Egypt, Western Front	Kitchener's Army brigade. Broken up February and reformed May and June 1918 by units of the 74th (Yeomanry) Division, and re-designated 94th (Yeomanry) Brigade.
95th Brigade	32nd Division; 5th Division	November 1915	Western Front	Kitchener's Army brigade. Also fought in the Italian Campaign. Transferred to 5th Division December 1915.
96th Brigade	32nd Division	November 1915	Western Front	Kitchener's Army brigade.
97th Brigade	32nd Division	November 1915	Western Front	Kitchener's Army brigade.
98th Brigade	33rd Division	November 1915	Western Front	Kitchener's Army brigade, formed from Public Schools Battalions of the Royal Fusiliers.
99th Brigade	33rd Division; 2nd Division	November 1915	Western Front	Kitchener's Army brigade, formed from Royal Fusiliers battalions. Left to join 2nd Division in November 1915
100th Brigade	33rd Division	November 1915	Western Front	Kitchener's Army brigade.
101st Brigade	34th Division	January 1916	Western Front	Kitchener's Army brigade.
102nd (Tyneside Scottish) Brigade	34th Division; 37th Division	January 1916	Western Front	Kitchener's Army brigade. Formed from Northumberland Fusiliers battalions. Attached to 37th Division July to August 1916, following heavy casualties incurred on the First day on the Somme.
103rd (Tyneside Irish) Brigade	34th Division; 37th Division	January 1916	Western Front	Kitchener's Army brigade. Formed from Northumberland Fusiliers battalions. Attached to 37th Division July to August 1916, following heavy casualties incurred on the First day on the Somme.
104th Brigade	35th Division	January 1916	Western Front	Kitchener's Army brigade.
105th Brigade	35th Division	January 1916	Western Front	Kitchener's Army brigade.
106th Brigade	35th Division	January 1916	Western Front	Kitchener's Army brigade.
107th Brigade	36th (Ulster) Division; 4th Division	October 1915	Western Front	Kitchener's Army brigade. Attached to 4th Division between November 1915 and February 1916. Formed from Royal Irish Rifles battalions.
108th Brigade	36th (Ulster) Division	October 1915	Western Front	Kitchener's Army brigade.
109th Brigade	36th (Ulster) Division	October 1915	Western Front	Kitchener's Army brigade.
110th Brigade	37th Division; 21st Division	August 1915	Western Front	Kitchener's Army brigade, formed from Leicestershire Regiment battalions. Transferred to 21st Division July 1916.
111th Brigade	37th Division; 34th Division	August 1915	Western Front	Kitchener's Army brigade. Attached from the 37th Division between July and August 1916.
112th Brigade	37th Division; 34th Division	August 1915	Western Front	Kitchener's Army brigade. Attached from the 37th Division between July and August 1916.
113th Brigade	38th (Welsh) Division	November 1915	Western Front	Kitchener's Army brigade, formed from Royal Welsh Fusiliers battalions.
114th Brigade	38th (Welsh) Division	November 1915	Western Front	Kitchener's Army brigade. Formed from Welsh Regiment battalions.
115th Brigade	38th (Welsh) Division	November 1915	Western Front	Kitchener's Army brigade.
116th Brigade	39th Division	March 1916	Western Front	Kitchener's Army brigade.
117th Brigade	39th Division	March 1916	Western Front	Kitchener's Army brigade.
118th Brigade	39th Division	March 1916	Western Front	Kitchener's Army brigade.
119th Brigade	40th Division	June 1916	Western Front	Kitchener's Army brigade. Also known as the Welsh Bantam Brigade.
120th Brigade	40th Division	June 1916	Western Front	Kitchener's Army brigade.
121st Brigade	40th Division	June 1916	Western Front	Kitchener's Army brigade.
122nd Brigade	41st Division	May 1916	Western Front	Kitchener's Army brigade. Also fought in the Italian Campaign.
123rd Brigade	41st Division	May 1916	Western Front	Kitchener's Army brigade. Also fought in the Italian Campaign.
124th Brigade	41st Division	May 1916	Western Front	Kitchener's Army brigade. Also fought in the Italian Campaign.
125th (Lancashire Fusiliers) Brigade	42nd (East Lancashire) Division	September 1916	Sinai and Palestine Campaign	First line Territorial brigade. Formed from Lancashire Fusiliers battalions. Also fought in the Gallipoli Campaign and on the Western Front.
126th (East Lancashire) Brigade	42nd (East Lancashire) Division	September 1916	Sinai and Palestine Campaign	First line Territorial brigade. Also fought in the Gallipoli Campaign and on the Western Front.
127th (Manchester) Brigade	42nd (East Lancashire) Division	September 1916	Sainai and Palestine Campaign	First line Territorial brigade. Formed from Manchester Regiment battalions. Also fought in the Gallipoli Campaign and on the Western Front.
128th (Hampshire) Brigade	43rd (Wessex) Division	October 1914	British India	First line Territorial brigade. Formed from Hampshire Regiment battalions.
129th (South Western) Brigade	43rd (Wessex) Division	October 1914	British India	First line Territorial brigade.
130th (Devon and Cornwall) Brigade	43rd (Wessex) Division	October 1914	British India	First line Territorial brigade.
131st (Surrey) Brigade	44th (Home Counties) Division	October 1914	British India	First line Territorial brigade.
132nd (Middlesex) Brigade	44th (Home Counties) Division	October 1914	British India	First line Territorial brigade.
133rd (Kent) Brigade	44th (Home Counties) Division	October 1914	British India	First line Territorial brigade.
134th (2/1st Hampshire) Brigade	45th (2nd Wessex) Division	December 1914	British India	Second line Territorial brigade, that was disbanded in September 1917.
135th (2/1st South Western) Brigade	45th (2nd Wessex) Division	December 1914	British India	Second line Territorial brigade.
136th (2/1st Devon and Cornwall) Brigade	45th (2nd Wessex) Division	December 1914	British India	Second line Territorial brigade.
137th (Staffordshire) Brigade	46th (North Midland) Division	February 1915	Western Front	First line Territorial brigade.
138th (Lincoln and Leicester) Brigade	46th (North Midland) Division	February 1915	Western Front	First line Territorial brigade.
139th (Sherwood Foresters) Brigade	46th (North Midland) Division	February 1915	Western Front	First line Territorial brigade. Formed from Sherwood Forester battalions.
140th (4th London) Brigade	47th (1/2nd London) Division	March 1915	Western Front	First line Territorial brigade. Formed from London Regiment battalions.
141st (5th London) Brigade	47th (1/2nd London) Division	March 1915	Western Front	First line Territorial brigade. Formed from London Regiment battalions.
142nd (6th London) Brigade	47th (1/2nd London) Division	March 1915	Western Front	First line Territorial brigade. Formed from London Regiment battalions.
143rd (Warwickshire) Brigade	48th (South Midland) Division	March 1915	Western Front	First line Territorial brigade. Formed from Royal Warwickshire Regiment battalions. Also fought in the Italian Campaign.
144th (Gloucester and Worcester) Brigade	48th (South Midland) Division	March 1915	Western Front	First line Territorial Army brigade. Also fought in the Italian Campaign.
145th (South Midland) Brigade	48th (South Midland) Division	March 1915	Western Front	First line Territorial brigade. Also fought in the Italian Campaign.
146th (West Riding) Brigade	49th (West Riding) Division	April 1915	Western Front	First line Territorial brigade. Formed from West Yorkshire Regiment battalions.
147th (2nd West Riding) Brigade	49th (West Riding) Division	April 1915	Western Front	First line Territorial brigade. Formed from Duke of Wellington's Regiment battalions.
148th (3rd West Riding) Brigade	49th (West Riding) Division	April 1915	Western Front	First line Territorial brigade.
149th (Northumberland) Brigade	50th (Northumbrian) Division	April 1915	Western Front	First line Territorial brigade. Formed from Northumberland Fusiliers battalions.
150th (York and Durham) Brigade	50th (Northumbrian) Division	April 1915	Western Front	First line Territorial brigade.
151st (Durham Light Infantry) Brigade	50th (Northumbrian) Division	April 1915	Western Front	First line Territorial brigade. Formed from Durham Light Infantry battalions.
152nd (1st Highland) Brigade	51st (Highland) Division	May 1915	Western Front	First line Territorial brigade. Known as the Seaforth and Cameron Brigade up to May 1915.
153rd (2nd Highland) Brigade	51st (Highland) Division	May 1915	Western Front	First line Territorial brigade. Known as the Gordon Brigade up to May 1915.
154th (3rd Highland) Brigade	51st (Highland) Division	May 1915	Western Front	First line Territorial brigade. Known as the Argyll and Sutherland Brigade up to May 1915.
155th (South Scottish) Brigade	52nd (Lowland) Division	May 1915	Gallipoli campaign	First line Territorial brigade. Also fought in the Sinai and Palestine Campaign and on the Western Front.
156th (Scottish Rifles) Brigade	52nd (Lowland) Division	May 1915	Gallipoli campaign	First line Territorial brigade. Formed from Cameronians (Scottish Rifles) battalions. Also fought in the Sinai and Palestine Campaign and on the Western Front.
157th (Highland Light Infantry) Brigade	52nd (Lowland) Division	May 1915	Gallipoli campaign	First line Territorial brigade. Formed from Highland Light Infantry battalions. Also fought in the Sinai and Palestine Campaign and on the Western Front.
158th (North Wales) Brigade	53rd (Welsh) Division	July 1915	Gallipoli campaign	First line Territorial brigade. Formed from Royal Welsh Fusiliers battalions. Also fought in the Sinai and Palestine Campaign.
159th (Cheshire) Brigade	53rd (Welsh) Division	July 1915	Gallipoli campaign	First line Territorial brigade. Formed from Cheshire Regiment battalions. Also fought in the Sinai and Palestine Campaign.
160th (South Wales) Brigade	53rd (Welsh) Division	July 1915	Gallipoli Campaign	First line Territorial brigade. Also fought in the Sinai and Palestine Campaign.
161st (Essex) Brigade	54th (East Anglian) Division	August 1915	Gallipoli campaign	First line Territorial brigade. Formed from Essex Regiment battalions. Also fought in the Sinai and Palestine Campaign.
162nd (East Midland) Brigade	54th (East Anglian) Division	August 1915	Gallipoli campaign	First line Territorial brigade. Also fought in the Sinai and Palestine Campaign.
163rd (Norfolk and Suffolk) Brigade	54th (East Anglian) Division	August 1915	Gallipoli campaign	First line Territorial brigade. Also fought in the Sinai and Palestine Campaign.
164th (North Lancashire) Brigade	55th (West Lancashire) Division	January 1916	Western Front	First line Territorial brigade.
165th (Liverpool) Brigade	55th (West Lancashire) Division	January 1916	Western Front	First line Territorial brigade. Formed from King's Regiment (Liverpool) battalions.
166th (South Lancashire) Brigade	55th (West Lancashire) Division	January 1916	Western Front	First line Territorial brigade.
167th (1st London) Brigade	56th (1st London) Division	January 1916	Western Front	First line Territorial brigade. Formed from London Regiment battalions. Left the division in September 1914 and rejoined in February 1916.
168th (2nd London) Brigade	56th (1st London) Division	January 1916	Western Front	First line Territorial brigade. Formed from London Regiment battalions. Broken up in November 1914 and reformed February 1916.
169th (3rd London) Brigade	56th (1st London) Division	January 1916	Western Front	First line Territorial brigade. Formed from London Regiment battalions. Broken up April 1915 and reformed February 1916.
170th (2/1st North Lancashire) Brigade	57th (2nd West Lancashire) Division	February 1917	Western Front	Second line Territorial brigade.
171st (2/1st Liverpool) Brigade	57th (2nd West Lancashire) Division	February 1917	Western Front	Second line Territorial brigade. Formed from King's Regiment (Liverpool) battalions.
172nd (2/1st South Lancashire) Brigade	57th (2nd West Lancashire) Division	February 1917	Western Front	Second line Territorial brigade.
173rd (3/1st London) Brigade	58th (2/1st London) Division	January 1917	Western Front	Second line Territorial brigade. Formed from London Regiment battalions.
174th (2/2nd London) Brigade	58th (2/1st London) Division	January 1917	Western Front	Second line Territorial brigade. Formed from London Regiment battalions.
175th (2/3rd London) Brigade	58th (2/1st London) Division	January 1917	Western Front	Second line Territorial brigade. Formed from London Regiment battalions. Replaced 2/1st London Brigade in August 1915.
176th (2/1st Staffordshire) Brigade	59th (2nd North Midland) Division	February 1917	Western Front	Second line Territorial brigade.
177th (2/1st Lincoln and Leicester) Brigade	59th (2nd North Midland) Division	February 1917	Western Front	Second line Territorial brigade.
178th (2/1st Nottinghamshire and Derbyshire) Brigade	59th (2nd North Midland) Division	February 1917	Western Front	Second line Territorial brigade. Formed from Sherwood Foresters battalions.
179th (2/4th London) Brigade	60th (2/2nd London) Division	June 1916	Western Front	Second line Territorial brigade. Formed from London Regiment battalions. Also fought on the Macedonian Front.
180th (2/5th London) Brigade	60th (2/2nd London) Division	June 1916	Western Front	Second line Territorial brigade. Formed from London Regiment battalions.
181st (2/6th London) Brigade	60th (2/2nd London) Division	June 1916	Western Front	Second line Territorial brigade. Formed from London Regiment battalions. Also fought on the Macedonian Front.
182nd (2nd Warwickshire) Brigade	61st (2nd South Midland) Division	May 1916	Western Front	Second line Territorial brigade. Formed from Royal Warwickshire Regiment battalions.
183rd (2nd Gloucester and Worcester) Brigade	61st (2nd South Midland) Division	May 1916	Western Front	Second line Territorial brigade.
184th (2nd South Midland) Brigade	61st (2nd South Midland) Division	May 1916	Western Front	Second line Territorial brigade.
185th (2/1st West Riding) Brigade	62nd (2nd West Riding) Division	January 1917	Western Front	Second line Territorial brigade. Formed from West Yorkshire Regiment battalions.
186th (2/2nd West Riding) Brigade	62nd (2nd West Riding) Division	January 1917	Western Front	Second line Territorial brigade. Formed from Duke of Wellington's Regiment battalions.
187th (2/3rd West Riding) Brigade	62nd (2nd West Riding) Division	January 1917	Western Front	Second line Territorial brigade.
188th (2/1st Northumberland) Brigade	63rd (2nd Northumbrian) Division		Home Service	Second line Territorial brigade, formed from Northumberland Fusiliers battalions. It was disbanded in November 1916 and its battalions were transferred 217th Brigade in 72nd Division
188th Brigade	63rd (Royal Naval) Division	July 1916	Western Front	
189th (2nd York and Durham) Brigade	63rd (2nd Northumbrian) Division		Home Service	Second line Territorial brigade. When the 63rd Division was disbanded in 1916 the brigade joined 73rd Division and was renumbered 220th Brigade.
189th Brigade	63rd (Royal Naval) Division	July 1916	Western Front	
190th (2nd Durham Light Infantry) Brigade	63rd (2nd Northumbrian) Division		Home Service	Second line Territorial brigade, formed from Durham Light Infantry battalions. When the 63rd Division was disbanded in 1916 the brigade joined 71st Division and was renumbered 214th Brigade.
190th Brigade	63rd (Royal Naval) Division	July 1916	Western Front	
191st (2nd Seaforth and Cameron Highlanders) Brigade	64th (2nd Highland) Division		Home Service	Second line Territorial brigade, formed from Seaforth Highlanders battalions.
192nd (2nd Gordon Highlanders) Brigade	64th (2nd Highland) Division		Home Service	Second line Territorial brigade. Formed from Gordon Highlanders battalions.
193rd (2nd Argyll and Sutherland Highlanders) Brigade	64th (2nd Highland) Division		Home Service	Second line Territorial brigade, formed from Argyll and Sutherland Highlanders battalions.
194th (2/1st South Scottish) Brigade	65th (2nd Lowland) Division		Home Service	Second line Territorial brigade.
195th (2/1st Scottish Rifles) Brigade	65th (2nd Lowland) Division		Home Service	Second line Territorial brigade, formed from four Cameronians (Scottish Rifles) battalions.
196th (2/1st Highland Light Infantry) Brigade	65th (2nd Lowland) Division		Home Service	Second line Territorial brigade, formed from Highland Light Infantry battalions.
197th (Lancashire Fusiliers) Brigade	66th (2nd East Lancashire) Division	March 1917	Western Front	Second line Territorial brigade, formed from Lancashire Fusiliers battalions.
198th (East Lancashire) Brigade	66th (2nd East Lancashire) Division	March 1917	Western Front	Second line Territorial brigade.
199th (Manchester) Brigade	66th (2nd East Lancashire) Division	March 1917	Western Front	Second line Territorial brigade, formed from Manchester Regiment battalions.
200th (2/1st Surrey) Brigade	67th (2nd Home Counties) Division		Home Service	Second line Territorial brigade. Demobilised February 1918.
201st (2/1st Middlesex) Brigade	67th (2nd Home Counties) Division		Home Service	Second line Territorial brigade, by Middlesex Regiment battalions.
202nd (2/1st Kent) Brigade	67th (2nd Home Counties) Division		Home Service	Second line Territorial brigade.
203rd (2nd North Wales) Brigade	68th (2nd Welsh) Division		Home Service	Second line Territorial brigade.
204th (2nd Cheshire) Brigade	68th (2nd Welsh) Division		Home Service	Second line Territorial brigade.
205th (2nd Welsh Border) Brigade	68th (2nd Welsh) Division		Home Service	Second line Territorial brigade.
206th (2nd Essex) Brigade	69th (2nd East Anglian) Division		Home Service	Second line Territorial brigade.
207th (2nd East Midland) Brigade	69th (2nd East Anglian) Division		Home Service	Second line Territorial brigade.
208th (2nd Norfolk and Suffolk) Brigade	69th (2nd East Anglian) Division		Home Service	Second line Territorial brigade.
209th Brigade	70th Division	Never formed		Number allocated but never formed
210th Brigade	70th Division	Never formed		Number allocated but never formed
211th Brigade	70th Division	Never formed		Number allocated but never formed
212th Brigade	71st Division		Home Service	Had a dual role of training and home defence. Broken up March 1918.
213th Brigade	71st Division		Home Service	Had a dual role of training and home defence. Broken up March 1918.
214th Brigade	71st Division; 67th (2nd Home Counties)		Home Service	Formed by renumbering 190th (2nd Durham Light Infantry) Brigade from disbanded 63rd (2nd Northumbrian) Division. Became a Special Brigade for service in Russia but remained in UK. Joined 67th Division, February 1918.
215th Brigade	72nd Division		Home Service	Had a dual role of training and home defence.
216th Brigade	72nd Division		Home Service	Had a dual role of training and home defence.
217th Brigade	72nd Division		Home Service	Had a dual role of training and home defence.
218th Brigade	73rd Division		Home Service	Had a dual role of training and home defence.
219th Brigade	73rd Division		Home Service	Had a dual role of training and home defence.
220th Brigade	73rd Division		Home Service	Formed by renumbering 189th (2nd York and Durham) Brigade from disbanded 63rd (2nd Northumbrian) Division
221st Mixed Brigade	Not allocated		Home Service	Formed from Provisional Battalions of Home Service Territorial personnel. Had a dual role of training and home defence.
222nd Mixed Brigade	Not allocated		Home Service	Formed from Provisional Battalions of Home Service Territorial personnel. Had a dual role training and home defence.
223rd Mixed Brigade	Not allocated		Home Service	Formed from Provisional Battalions of Home Service Territorial personnel. Had a dual role of training and home defence.
224th Mixed Brigade	Not allocated		Home Service	Formed from Provisional Battalions of Home Service Territorial personnel. Had a dual role of training and home defence.
225th Mixed Brigade	Not allocated		Home Service	Formed from Provisional Battalions of Home Service Territorial personnel. Had a dual role of training and home defence.
226th Mixed Brigade	71st Division; 67th (2nd Home Counties)		Home Service	Formed from Provisional Battalions of Home Service Territorial personnel. Had a dual role of training and home defence.
227th Mixed Brigade	Not allocated		Home Service	Formed from Provisional Battalions of Home Service Territorial personnel. Had a dual role training and home defence.
228th Brigade	28th Division	February 1917	Western Front	Formed in February 1917 as Army Troops. Also fought on the Macedonian Front, it was associated with the 28th Division, then came under command of the Greek Crete Division from September to October 1918, when it was broken up.
229th Brigade	74th (Yeomanry) Division	March 1917	Sinai and Palestine Campaign	First line Territorial brigade, previously the 2nd Dismounted Brigade. Also fought on the Western Front.
230th Brigade	74th (Yeomanry) Division	March 1917	Sinai and Palestine Campaign	First line Territorial brigade, previously the 3rd Dismounted Brigade. Also fought on the Western Front.
231st Brigade	74th (Yeomanry) Division	March 1917	Sinai and Palestine Campaign	First line Territorial brigade, previously the 4th Dismounted Brigade. Also fought on the Western Front.
232nd Brigade	75th Division	March 1917	Sinai and Palestine Campaign	First line Territorial brigade.
233rd Brigade	75th Division	March 1917	Sinai and Palestine Campaign	First line Territorial brigade.
234th Brigade	75th Division	March 1917	Sinai and Palestine Campaign	First line Territorial brigade.
236th Brigade	Syren Force	November 1918	North Russia	Formed from 75th Brigade
237th Brigade	Syren Force	June 1918	North Russia	
238th Brigade	Independent	November 1918	North Russia	
242nd Brigade	28th Division	March 1920	Turkey	British Army of Occupation in Turkey after Armistice
Black Watch Brigade	Scottish Command		Home service	First line Territorial brigade assigned to Coastal Defence duties, it was dissolved in early 1915 as its constituent battalions were posted to other formations.
2/1st Black Watch Brigade	Scottish Command		Home service	Second line Territorial brigade, duplicate of the Black Watch Brigade. It was dissolved in November 1915 as its constituent battalions were posted to other formations.
Lothian Brigade	Scottish Command		Home service	First line Territorial brigade assigned to Coastal Defence duties. Became 1st Provisional Brigade.
South Wales Brigade	Western Command		Home Service	First line Territorial brigade assigned as Army Troops and attached to the Welsh Division. It was dissolved in early 1915 as its constituent battalions were posted to other formations.
Highland Reserve Brigade			Home service	Territorial training brigade
Lowland Reserve Brigade			Home service	Territorial training brigade
West Lancashire Reserve Brigade			Home service	Territorial training brigade
East Lancashire Reserve Brigade			Home service	Territorial training brigade
Welsh Reserve Brigade			Home service	Territorial training brigade
Northumbrian Reserve Brigade			Home service	Territorial training brigade
West Riding Reserve Brigade			Home service	Territorial training brigade
North Midland Reserve Brigade			Home service	Territorial training brigade
South Midland Reserve Brigade			Home service	Territorial training brigade
East Anglian Reserve Brigade			Home service	Territorial training brigade
Wessex Reserve Brigade			Home service	Territorial training brigade
Home Counties Reserve Brigade			Home service	Territorial training brigade
1st London Reserve Brigade			Home service	Territorial training brigade
2nd London Reserve Brigade			Home service	Territorial training brigade
3rd London Reserve Brigade			Home service	Territorial training brigade

== See also ==
- British Army during World War I
- British Army First World War reserve brigades
- British Army uniform and equipment in World War I
- British Expeditionary Force order of battle (1914)
- British Expeditionary Force (World War I)
- List of British divisions in World War I
- List of British brigades of the Second World War
- Recruitment to the British Army during the First World War

== Notes ==
Footnotes

Citations

== Bibliography ==
- Army Council Instructions Issued During August 1916, London HM Stationery Office.
- Becke, Maj A.F., History of the Great War: Order of Battle of Divisions, Part 1: The Regular British Divisions, London: HM Stationery Office, 1934/Uckfield: Naval & Military Press, 2007, ISBN 1-847347-38-X.
- Maj A.F. Becke,History of the Great War: Order of Battle of Divisions, Part 2a: The Territorial Force Mounted Divisions and the 1st-Line Territorial Force Divisions (42–56), London: HM Stationery Office, 1935/Uckfield: Naval & Military Press, 2007, ISBN 1-847347-39-8.
- Becke, Maj A.F., History of the Great War: Order of Battle of Divisions, Part 2b: The 2nd-Line Territorial Force Divisions (57th–69th), with the Home-Service Divisions (71st–73rd) and 74th and 75th Divisions, London: HM Stationery Office, 1937/Uckfield: Naval & Military Press, 2007, ISBN 1-847347-39-8
- Becke, Maj A.F., History of the Great War: Order of Battle of Divisions, Part 3a: New Army Divisions (9–26), London: HM Stationery Office, 1938/Uckfield: Naval & Military Press, 2007, ISBN 1-847347-41-X
- Maj A.F. Becke,History of the Great War: Order of Battle of Divisions, Part 3b: New Army Divisions (30–41) and 63rd (R.N.) Division, London: HM Stationery Office, 1939/Uckfield: Naval & Military Press, 2007, ISBN 1-847347-41-X.
- Chappell, Brad (2008). The Regimental Warpath. Takoma Park, Maryland: General Data LLC. ISBN 978-0-9820541-0-9.
- Hart, Peter (2008). 1918 A very British victory. London: Phoenix. ISBN 978-0-7538-2689-8.
- Messenger, Charles (2005). Call to Arms: The British Army, 1914–18. London: Weidenfeld & Nicolson. ISBN 0-297-84695-7.
- Rinaldi, Richard A (2008). Order of Battle of the British Army 1914. Takoma Park, Maryland: Tiger Lilly Books. ISBN 978-0-9776072-8-0.
- Tucker, Spencer; Roberts, Priscilla Mary (2005). World War I: encyclopedia. Santa Barbara, California: ABC-CLIO. ISBN 1-85109-420-2.
