= 236th Brigade =

236th Brigade may refer to:

- 236th Brigade (United Kingdom)
- 236th Brigade, Royal Field Artillery, United Kingdom
