= Bruce Hamilton (British Army officer) =

British Army general

General Sir Bruce Hamilton GCB KCVO
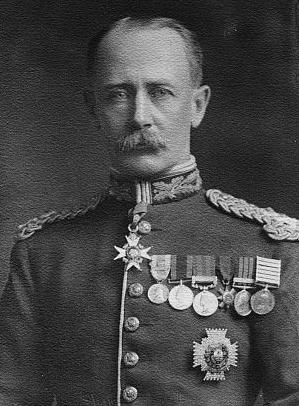
- Born: 7 December 1857; Sidmouth, Devon, England
- Died: 6 July 1936 (aged 78); Wendover, Buckinghamshire, England
- Relatives: Major General Hubert Hamilton (brother)
- Military career
- Allegiance: United Kingdom
- Branch: British Army
- Service years: 1874–1918
- Rank: General
- Units: Suffolk Yeomanry; East Yorkshire Regiment
- Commands: Scottish Command; 2nd Division; 3rd Division
- Conflicts: Second Anglo-Afghan War; First Boer War; Second Boer War; First World War
- Awards: Knight Grand Cross of the Order of the Bath; Knight Commander of the Royal Victorian Order; Mentioned in Despatches; Grand Officer of the Order of the Crown of Italy

General Sir Bruce Meade Hamilton, GCB, KCVO (7 December 1857 – 6 July 1936) was a British Army general during the Second Boer War and the First World War. He also served in the Second Anglo-Afghan War and First Boer War, and later commanded the Scottish Command.

== Early life ==
Hamilton was born the second son of General Henry Meade Hamilton. His three brothers all became officers in the British Army, including the third son, Hubert Ion Wetherall Hamilton.

== Military career ==
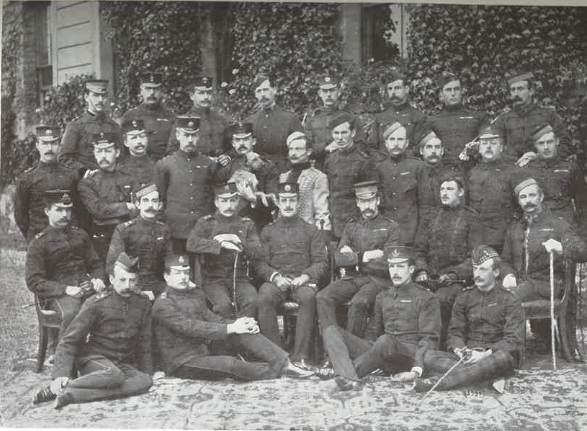
The Staff College, Camberley, class in 1890. Stood in the second row, fourth from the left, is Lieutenant B. M. Hamilton.

Hamilton was appointed a sub-lieutenant in the West Suffolk Regiment of Yeomanry Cavalry in 1874 and commissioned into the East Yorkshire Regiment in 1877. He served in the Second Anglo-Afghan War in 1880 and the First Boer War in 1881. Promoted from supernumerary captain to captain in September 1887, and in October 1895 to major, he became commander of the Niger Coast Protectorate Force in Benin City in 1897.

Hamilton took part in the Second Boer War from 1900 until 1902. He played a key role in the capture of Naauwpoort. During the latter part of the war he was in command of the military columns operating in Eastern Transvaal, and following the announcement of peace on 31 May 1902, he supervised the surrender of arms in that area. In his final despatch from South Africa in June 1902, Lord Kitchener, Commander-in-Chief of the forces during the latter part of the war, described Hamilton as an officer "possessed of qualities of boldness, energy and resolution in no common degree". He left Cape Town on board the SS Walmer Castle in late June 1902, and arrived at Southampton the following month. In the South Africa honours list published on 26 June 1902, Hamilton was appointed a Knight Commander of the Order of the Bath (KCB), and he invested as such by King Edward VII at Buckingham Palace on 24 October 1902.

After his return, Hamilton was in April 1903 appointed general officer commanding the 5th Brigade, 3rd Division within 1st Army Corps, transferring to 2nd Division in 1904. He was promoted to lieutenant general in February 1907 and was appointed general officer commanding-in-chief for Scottish Command in 1909.

He was promoted on 3 June 1913 to general.

He was army commander of the Home Defence formations First Army and Northern Army during the First World War. He was appointed a Knight Grand Cross of the Order of the Bath in the 1915 Birthday Honours and became colonel of the Border Regiment in December 1915.

He retired from the army on 21 April 1920.

Military offices
Preceded by Herbert Chermside	GOC 3rd Division; 1902–1904	Vacant Title next held by William Franklyn
Preceded by Charles Douglas	GOC 2nd Division; 1904–1907	Succeeded by Theodore Stephenson
Preceded by Sir Edward Leach	GOC-in-C Scottish Command; 1909–1913	Succeeded by Sir James Wolfe Murray
Honorary titles
Preceded by William John Chads	Colonel of the Border Regiment; 1915–1923	Succeeded by Ewen Sinclair-MacLagan
