= 223rd Brigade (United Kingdom) =

Home Defence formation of the British Army

3rd Provisional Brigade 223rd Mixed Brigade 223rd Independent Infantry Brigade
- Formation sign used by the 223rd Independent Infantry Brigade from November 1941 to November 1942.
- Active: 1915–1919; 1940–1942
- Country: United Kingdom
- Branch: British Army
- Type: Infantry
- Role: Home Defence
- Size: Brigade

Commanders
- Notable commanders: Brigadier Sir Alexander Stanier, Bart 1940 — 1942

Insignia
- Insignia worn by the brigade troops while in the Essex County Division.

The 223rd Brigade was a Home Defence formation of the British Army in the First and the Second World Wars. It existed under several variations of the 223 Brigade title, and was eventually converted into an airborne formation.

== World War I ==
On the outbreak of World War I, the Territorial Force (TF) immediately mobilised for home defence, but shortly afterwards (31 August 1914), its units were authorised to raise 2nd line battalions formed from those men who had not volunteered for, or were not fit for, overseas service, together with new volunteers, while the 1st Line went overseas to supplement the Regulars. Early in 1915 the 2nd Line TF battalions were raised to full strength to form new divisions, and began to form Reserve (3rd Line) units to supply drafts. The remaining Home Service men were separated out in May 1915 to form brigades of Coast Defence Battalions (termed Provisional Battalions from June 1915).

=== 3rd Provisional Brigade ===
3rd Provisional Brigade was formed mainly from details of regiments from Eastern England, with the following composition:

- 3rd Provisional Yeomanry Squadron (from the Fife and Forfar Yeomanry and the Lovat Scouts)
- 3rd Provisional Cyclist Company
- 3rd Provisional Battery and Ammunition Column Royal Field Artillery
- 43rd Provisional Battalion (from home service details of 5th and 6th Battalions, King's Regiment (Liverpool))
- 62nd Provisional Battalion (from home service details of 2/4th Battalion, Northamptonshire Regiment and 2/1st Battalion, Cambridgeshire Regiment)
- 64th Provisional Battalion (from home service details of 4th and 5th Battalions, Suffolk Regiment)
- 65th Provisional Battalion (from home service details of 4th Battalion Essex Regiment)
- 66th Provisional Battalion (from home service details of 5th (part) and 6th Battalions, Essex Regiment)
- 67th Provisional Battalion (from home service details of 5th (part) and 7th Battalions, Essex Regiment )
- 3rd Provisional Brigade Train Army Service Corps
- 3rd Provisional Field Ambulance Royal Army Medical Corps (from 2nd Welsh Field Ambulance)

Under the command of Brigadier-General H.J. Archdale, the brigade was attached to the 69th (2nd East Anglian) Division in the area around Thetford, Newmarket and Bury St Edmunds under the control of First Army of Central Force (18 September – 16 October 1915).

When the 3rd Provisional Brigade left the 69th Division, it also had the following units attached to it:

- 117th Heavy Battery Royal Garrison Artillery
- Half of 1/1st Devon Heavy Battery RGA
- No 2 Armoured Train
- 1/6th (Cyclist) Battalion Norfolk Regiment
- 2/25th (Cyclist) Battalion London Regiment

In March 1916 the Provisional Brigades were concentrated along the South and East Coast of England. 3rd Provisional Brigade came under the orders of Northern Army, with its battalions billeted across Norfolk as follows:

- Brigade Headquarters: Holt
- 43rd Provisional Battalion Weybourne
- 62nd Provisional Battalion Sheringham
- 64th Provisional Battalion Salthouse
- 66th Provisional Battalion Cley next the Sea
- 67th Provisional Battalion Darsham
- 2/1st Highland (Fifeshire) Heavy Battery, RGA, Sheringham – joined September 1916 from 64th (2nd Highland) Division

=== 223rd Mixed Brigade ===
The Military Service Act 1916 swept away the Home/Foreign service distinction, and all TF soldiers became liable for overseas service, if medically fit. The Provisional Brigades thus became anomalous, and at the end of 1916 their units became numbered battalions of their parent units. Part of their role was physical conditioning to render men fit for drafting overseas. The 3rd Provisional Brigade became the 223rd Mixed Brigade in December 1916, with its units re-designated as follows on 1 January 1917:

- 43rd Provisional Battalion became 25th Battalion, King's (Liverpool Regiment)
- 62nd Provisional Battalion became 9th Battalion, Northamptonshire Regiment
- 64th Provisional Battalion became 14th Battalion, Suffolk Regiment
- 66th Provisional Battalion became 16th Battalion, Essex Regiment, and transferred to the 71st Division
- 67th Provisional Battalion became 17th Battalion, Essex Regiment
- 2/1st Highland (Fifeshire) Heavy Battery, RGA (unchanged)
- 3rd Provisional Field Company became 642nd (London) Field Company Royal Engineers
- 3rd Provisional Battery and Ammunition Column became 1205th (West Lancashire) Battery RFA
- 3rd Provisional Brigade Train became 835th Company ASC
- 3rd Provisional Field Ambulance became 331st Field Ambulance RAMC

The brigade was attached to the 64th (2nd Highland) Division.

In May 1918 each of the Mixed Brigades was called upon to provide a battalion (re-designated a Garrison Guard battalion) to reconstitute the 59th (2nd North Midland) Division, which had been virtually destroyed during the German spring offensive. The 223rd Mixed Brigade supplied 25th King's (Liverpool Regiment) to the 176th (2/1st Staffordshire) Brigade and immediately raised a new 27th (Home Service) Battalion, King's to take over its coast defence duties. The brigade remained with this composition until the end of the war, after which it was demobilised.

== World War II ==
In World War II, the brigade number was reactivated as the 223rd Independent Infantry Brigade (Home), formed for service in the United Kingdom in Eastern Command. The brigade was attached to the 15th (Scottish) Infantry Division (31 October 1940 – 26 February 1941) and then the Essex County Division (26 February – 22 July 1941) before coming under the command of XI Corps. While in this formation it was re-designated as the 223rd Independent Infantry Brigade.

=== Order of Battle ===
For its entire career as the 223rd Brigade it was commanded by Brigadier Sir Alexander Stanier, Bart and was initially composed of newly raised infantry battalions.

- As part of the 15th Infantry Division and the Essex County Division.
  - 6th Battalion, Northamptonshire Regiment (18 October 1940 — 22 July 1941)
  - 8th Battalion, Suffolk Regiment (24 October 1940 — 22 July 1941)
  - 10th Battalion, Essex Regiment (31 October — 22 July 1941)
  - 10th Battalion, York and Lancaster Regiment (17 November 1940 21 February 1941)
- As part of the 223rd Independent Infantry Brigade
  - 6th Battalion, Northamptonshire Regiment (22 July 1941 — 13 September 1942)
  - 8th Battalion, Suffolk Regiment (22 July 1941 — 4 September 1942)
  - 10th Battalion, Essex Regiment (22 July 1941 — 6 November 1942)
  - 10th Battalion, Somerset Light Infantry (4 September 1942 — 6 November 1942)
  - 13th Battalion, Royal Warwickshire Regiment (13 September 1942 — 6 November 1942)
  - 223rd Field Ambulance (from 22 July 1941)

=== 3rd Parachute Brigade ===
The 223rd Independent Infantry Brigade was converted into the 3rd Parachute Brigade on 7 November 1942, and its battalions were converted as follows:

- 10th Battalion, Essex Regiment became 9th Battalion, Parachute Regiment
- 10th Battalion, Somerset Light Infantry became 7th Battalion, Parachute Regiment
- 13th Battalion, Royal Warwickshire Regiment became 8th Battalion, Parachute Regiment

The 223rd Brigade number has never been reactivated.
