= List of British divisions in the First World War =

Key
Regular Army	Green
Territorial Force	Blue
Yeomanry	Yellow
New Army	Red
Other	Grey

List of military divisions — List of British divisions in the First World War

This page is a list of British divisions that existed in the First World War. Divisions were either infantry or cavalry. Divisions were categorised as being 'Regular Army' (professional), 'Territorial Force' (part-time) or 'New Army' (wartime). The 'Territorial' cavalry was referred to as Yeomanry.

== Infantry ==
Guards Division
1st Division
2nd Division
3rd Division
4th Division
5th Division
6th Division
7th Division
8th Division
9th (Scottish) Division
10th (Irish) Division
11th (Northern) Division
12th (Eastern) Division
13th (Western) Division
14th (Light) Division
15th (Scottish) Division
16th (Irish) Division
17th (Northern) Division
18th (Eastern) Division
19th (Western) Division
20th (Light) Division
21st Division
22nd Division
23rd Division
24th Division
25th Division
26th Division
27th Division
28th Division
29th Division
30th Division
31st Division
32nd Division
33rd Division
34th Division
35th Division
36th (Ulster) Division
37th Division
38th (Welsh) Division
39th Division
40th Division
41st Division
42nd (East Lancashire) Division
43rd (Wessex) Division
44th (Home Counties) Division
45th (2nd Wessex) Division
46th (North Midland) Division
47th (1/2nd London) Division
48th (South Midland) Division
49th (West Riding) Division
50th (Northumbrian) Division
51st (Highland) Division
52nd (Lowland) Division
53rd (Welsh) Division
54th (East Anglian) Division
55th (West Lancashire) Division
56th (1/1st London) Division
57th (2nd West Lancashire) Division
58th (2/1st London) Division
59th (2nd North Midland) Division
60th (2/2nd London) Division
61st (2nd South Midland) Division
62nd (2nd West Riding) Division
63rd (2nd Northumbrian) Division
63rd (Royal Naval) Division
64th (2nd Highland) Division
65th (2nd Lowland) Division
66th (2nd East Lancashire) Division
67th (2nd Home Counties) Division
68th (2nd Welsh) Division
69th (2nd East Anglian) Division
71st Division
72nd Division
73rd Division
74th (Yeomanry) Division
75th Division

== Cavalry ==
1st Cavalry Division
2nd Cavalry Division
3rd Cavalry Division
1st Mounted Division - renamed 1st Cyclist Division in July 1916 then broken up in November 1916
2nd Mounted Division - broken up in January 1916
2/2nd Mounted Division - renamed 3rd Mounted Division in March 1916, 1st Mounted Division in July 1916, then The Cyclist Division in September 1917
4th Mounted Division - renamed 2nd Cyclist Division in July 1916, then broken up in November 1916
Yeomanry Mounted Division - renamed 1st Mounted Division in April 1918 then 4th Cavalry Division in July 1918

== See also ==
- British infantry brigades of the First World War
- List of British divisions in World War II
- List of Indian divisions in World War I

== Sources ==
- Becke, Archibald F. (1935). Order of Battle of Divisions Part 1–The Regular British Divisions. London: HMSO. OCLC 4405016.
- Becke, Archibald F. (1936). Order of Battle of Divisions Part 2A. The Territorial Force Mounted Divisions and the 1st-Line Territorial Force Divisions (42–56). London: HMSO. OCLC 4405016.
- Becke, Archibald F. (1937). Order of Battle of Divisions Part 2B. The 2nd-Line Territorial Force Divisions (57th–69th) with The Home-Service Divisions (71st–73rd) and 74th and 75th Divisions. London: HMSO. OCLC 4405016.
- Becke, Archibald F. (1938). Order of Battle of Divisions Part 3A. New Army Divisions (9–26). London: HMSO. OCLC 4405016.
- Becke, Archibald F. (1945). Order of Battle of Divisions Part 3B. New Army Divisions (30-41) & 63rd (R.N.) Division. London: HMSO. OCLC 4405016.
