= First Army (Home Forces) =

First Army was a home service formation of the British Army during the First World War.

First Army was formed on 5 August 1914 under the command of Central Force. It was based at Bedford and Sir Bruce Hamilton was the Army Commander. Units attached to the Army were the Highland Division and the Highland Mounted Brigade.

First Army kept its name even after the establishment of a First Army in the British Expeditionary Force in December 1914. It was disbanded on 12 March 1916 and reformed as Northern Army.
