= 173rd (3/1st London) Brigade =

- Active: 1915–19; 1943–45
- Country: United Kingdom
- Branch: Territorial Force
- Type: Infantry
- Size: Brigade
- Part of: 58th (2/1st London) Division
- Engagements: First World War: Arras; Passchendaele; German spring offensive Amiens; Hundred Days Offensive; Second World War: Operation Fortitude

Commanders
- Notable commanders: Brig-Gen Bernard Freyberg, VC

The 173rd (3/1st London) Brigade was a formation of the British Army's Territorial Force that was raised in 1915. It was assigned to the 58th (2/1st London) Division and served on the Western Front during the First World War. Its number was used for a deception formation during the Second World War.

== Origin ==
When the Territorial Force (TF) was created in 1908, the 1st London Brigade in 1st London Division comprised the first four battalions of the new London Regiment, each of which had previously been a Volunteer battalion of the Royal Fusiliers (the City of London Regiment). After the First World War broke out in 1914, the 1st London Brigade was the first complete TF formation to go overseas on service, relieving the Regular Army garrison of Malta. Each battalion left behind a cadre of officers and men (mainly those who were unfit or who had not volunteered for overseas service) to begin the task of raising a 2nd Line battalion from the mass of volunteers who were coming forward. These units were distinguished from the 1st line by a '2/' prefix, so that the 2/1st London Brigade was created in the 2/1st London Division, consisting of the 2/1st, 2/2nd etc battalions of the London Regiment. Initially, the 2nd Line was regarded as a reserve for the TF overseas, but its units were soon being prepared for overseas service themselves, and a 3rd Line was organised to train drafts for the first two. As early as December 1914, the 2/1st London Brigade sailed to relieve the 1/1st Brigade in Malta, and was replaced in the 2/1st London Division by the 3/1st London Brigade. Unusually, therefore, the eventual reserve units of the first four battalions of the London Regiment were numbered as the 4th Line.

=== Initial Order of Battle ===
The 3/1st London Brigade came into existence at Tadworth in Surrey in April 1915 and its first commander, Colonel H. Cholmondeley, CB, (London Rifle Brigade) was appointed on 10 May. Cholmondeley had commanded the Mounted Infantry of the City Imperial Volunteers during the Second Boer War, had commanded a Prisoner of war camp at Lancaster, Lancashire after the outbreak of war in 1914, and had just raised the 3/5th Bn London Regiment (London Rifle Brigade). The 3/1st London Bde's component battalions had already been raised:

- 3/1st (City of London) Battalion, London Regiment (Royal Fusiliers) – January 1915
- 3/2nd (City of London) Battalion, London Regiment (Royal Fusiliers) – December 1914 at Tattenham Corner, Epsom
- 3/3rd (City of London) Battalion, London Regiment (Royal Fusiliers) – January 1915
- 3/4th (City of London) Battalion, London Regiment (Royal Fusiliers) – December 1914 at Hoxton

Within the division, the brigade was informally known as the 'Fusilier Brigade'.

=== 29th Battalion, London Regiment ===
In June 1915, a reorganisation saw the men of the 3/1st London Brigade who were unfit for overseas service separated out into a composite battalion, the 100th Provisional Battalion. (Note: According to the regimental history of the 4th Londons; however, the Army Council Instruction establishing the provisional battalions specified that 100th Provisional Battalion was actually composed of men from the 1st, 2nd, 4th and 7th Londons.) This was stationed at Aldeburgh, guarding the East Coast as part of 6th Provisional Brigade. In August, all the men of the Provisional Battalion were returned to their units except those who had not volunteered for overseas service. These Home Service men continued serving in home defence until 1916, when the Military Service Act swept away the Home/Overseas service distinction and the provisional battalions took on the dual role of home defence and physical conditioning to render men fit for drafting overseas. The 100th Provisional Battalion officially became the 29th (City of London) Bn, London Regiment (TF) on 1 January 1917. The battalion never served overseas, and was demobilised early in 1919. After the conflict it was mentioned on both the Royal Fusiliers War Memorial and London Troops Memorial, whilst its World War One casualties are listed by name in the roll of honour at the Royal Fusiliers Chapel in St Sepulchre-without-Newgate.

== Training ==
The 3/1st London Brigade moved to Bury St Edmunds at the end of May, and was soon recruited back to full strength after the departure of the Provisional Battalion. The camp at Tattenham Corner, where 3/2nd Bn had been raised, became the Brigade School of Instruction for training officers of these new units. At the end of June, the brigade moved into billets in Ipswich, where the 2/1st London Division was being concentrated. In August 1915 the division was redesignated the 58th (2/1st London) Division, and the 3/1st London Brigade became the 173rd (3/1st London) Brigade alongside the 174th (2/2nd London) and 175th (2/3rd London) Brigades.

Although the role of draft-finding for the battalions overseas was now taken over by the brigade's 4th Line battalions, training was disrupted by these frequent moves and by the men being in billets until June 1916 when they moved into Blackrock Camp outside Ipswich. The only weapons available for training were .256-in Japanese Ariska rifles. The battalions absorbed large drafts of recruits under the Derby scheme in February 1916.

In June 1916, the 2/1st Brigade, having seen active service at Gallipoli and against the Senussi rebels, was sent to France where it was broken up and the men drafted to the 1st Line battalions serving on the Western Front with the 56th (1/1st London) Division. As a result, the 3rd Line battalions of the 173rd Bde were renumbered as 2nd Line units.

At the time of the renumbering, the 58th Division was carrying out coast defence duties in East Anglia, but on 10 July 1916 it concentrated at Sutton Veny for battle training on Salisbury Plain. The men finally received Lee Enfield service rifles in place of the Japanese weapons. On 20 January 1917, embarkation of 58th Division for France began at Southampton.

== Western Front ==
=== Order of Battle ===
During its service on the Western Front, the brigade had the following composition:

- 2/1st (City of London) Bn, London Regiment (Royal Fusiliers) – disbanded 31 January 1918
- 2/2nd (City of London) Bn, London Regiment (Royal Fusiliers)
- 2/3rd (City of London) Bn, London Regiment (Royal Fusiliers) – absorbed 1/3rd Bn (from 56th Division) 31 January 1918 and became 3rd Bn
- 2/4th (City of London) Bn, London Regiment (Royal Fusiliers) – amalgamated into 2/2nd Bn 12 September 1918
- 2/24th (County of London) Bn, London Regiment (Queen's) – joined 11 September 1918
- 173rd Trench Mortar Battery – formed before embarkation for France
- 214th Company, Machine Gun Corps (MGC) – formed at Grantham 10 December 1916; joined brigade 25 March 1917; joined No 58 Bn MGC 2 March 1918

=== Trench warfare ===
After concentrating around Lucheux, the brigade went into the line for the first time, at Ransart, south of Arras. This was considered a quiet sector, and the brigade was attached to 146th (1st West Riding) Brigade of the 49th (West Riding) Infantry Division for an introduction to trench warfare. From February to April, the 58th Division followed up the German retreat to the Hindenburg Line and was then put to work to repair the roads and railways destroyed by the retreating enemy.

=== Bullecourt ===
Under heavy shellfire during the night of 13/14 May, 173rd Bde relieved the 15th Australian Brigade, which had been attacking at the Second Battle of Bullecourt. 2/3rd and 2/4th Battalions formed the front line, with two companies of 2/2nd Bn in support. A serious counter-attack against the brigade's position on 15 May was broken up by shell and small arms fire; a lodgement in 2/3rd Bn's line was driven out with the help of A Company of the 2/2nd. After two days in the line, suffering heavy casualties under bombardment, 2/3rd and 2/4th Bns had to be withdrawn and replaced by the rest of the brigade. 173rd Brigade was relieved by 175th Bde on 21 May. On 15 June the brigade carried out a carefully rehearsed attack to take the last portion of the Hindenburg Line at Bullecourt. The attackers were disposed as:

- Right: 1 company 2/3rd Londons
- Right Centre: 1 1(1/2) companies 2/1st Londons
- Left centre: 1 1(1/2) companies 2/2nd Londons
- Left: 1 company 2/4th Londons

The attack went in with an extraordinary weight of artillery support: the divisional artilleries of 58th and two other divisions, the corps artillery, and the three brigade machine-gun companies of 58th Division. Zero hour was at 02.50, and tapes and duckboard trench bridges were laid after dark on 14 June to help the troops maintain direction in the maze of trenches. When the barrage opened at 02.50 the troops followed it closely and reached their first objective with little loss but the German pillboxes (Mannschafts-Eisenbeton-Unterstände Mebus) caused difficulties, while on the left the attackers had overrun their objective and pushed too far forwards into their standing barrage. The brigade attacked again the following night to complete the work, using more companies but the preparations were disrupted by four German counter-attacks starting at 22.30. Eventually the attack began at 03.10 on 16 June, with 2/1st on the right, 2/2nd in the centre and 2/4th on the left. The attack succeeded in establishing itself in the Hindenburg Support Line. Here they were again counter-attacked and messages sent back for artillery support failed to get through; by the end of the day the brigade was back at the Hindenburg Front Line, where it held on until relieved by 174th Bde at 02.30 on 17 June. Casualties for the two days amounted to 49 officers and 955 other ranks.

=== Ypres ===
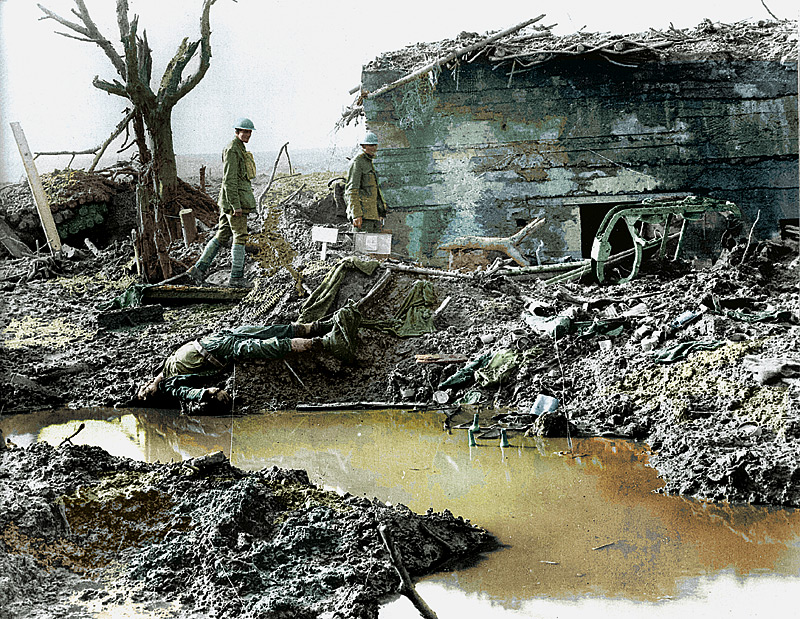
Captured German pillbox or 'Mebu' at Passchendaele

After a period of further training, labouring and trench holding near Arras and then at Havrincourt the 58th Division moved to the Ypres Salient in late August 1917. 173rd Brigade took over the division's frontage on 11/12 September. In preparation for the attack of 20 September (the Battle of the Menin Road Ridge), a series of trench raids was undertaken. On 14 September, A Company of 2/1st Bn raided the strongly fortified area round 'Winnipeg Crossroads': the raid was a failure, with over three quarters of the attackers posted missing, and drew a quick counter-attack from the enemy, which was also repulsed. During the exchange of shellfire on 19 September, 173rd Bde's commander, Brig-Gen Bernard Freyberg, was wounded on his way up to his battle HQ, though he continued to command the brigade from a stretcher until evacuated after the following morning's attack, when he was temporarily replaced by Lt-Col Dann of the 2/4th Bn.

173rd Brigade's attack was carried out by 2/4th Bn, advancing in four company columns, each 100 strong, against Winnipeg Crossroads. The rest of the brigade was not involved in the attack, except for C Company of 2/3rd Bn making a mock attack as a diversion. Assembling the attackers in the thick mud and darkness caused problems, but the assault went in at 05.40 behind an intense creeping barrage. Only at Schuler Farm, where the supporting tanks were bogged down and the attacking platoon was almost wiped out, did the attack fail. The battalion was on its other objectives within half an hour, but casualties from shellfire had been severe, and a company of 2/3rd Bn was sent to thicken up the line. Similarly, British shellfire broke up a German counter-attack, and Schuler Farm was evacuated, so that the planned follow-up attack by 2/3rd Bn became unnecessary. 2/2nd Battalion took over the line, consolidated, and brought in wounded until the brigade was relieved during the night of 20/21 September. Although 58th Division participated in the Battle of Polygon Wood (26 September), 173rd Bde was not engaged (though 2/2nd Bn helped 175th Bde with a mock attack as a diversion), and afterwards the 58th went into reserve.

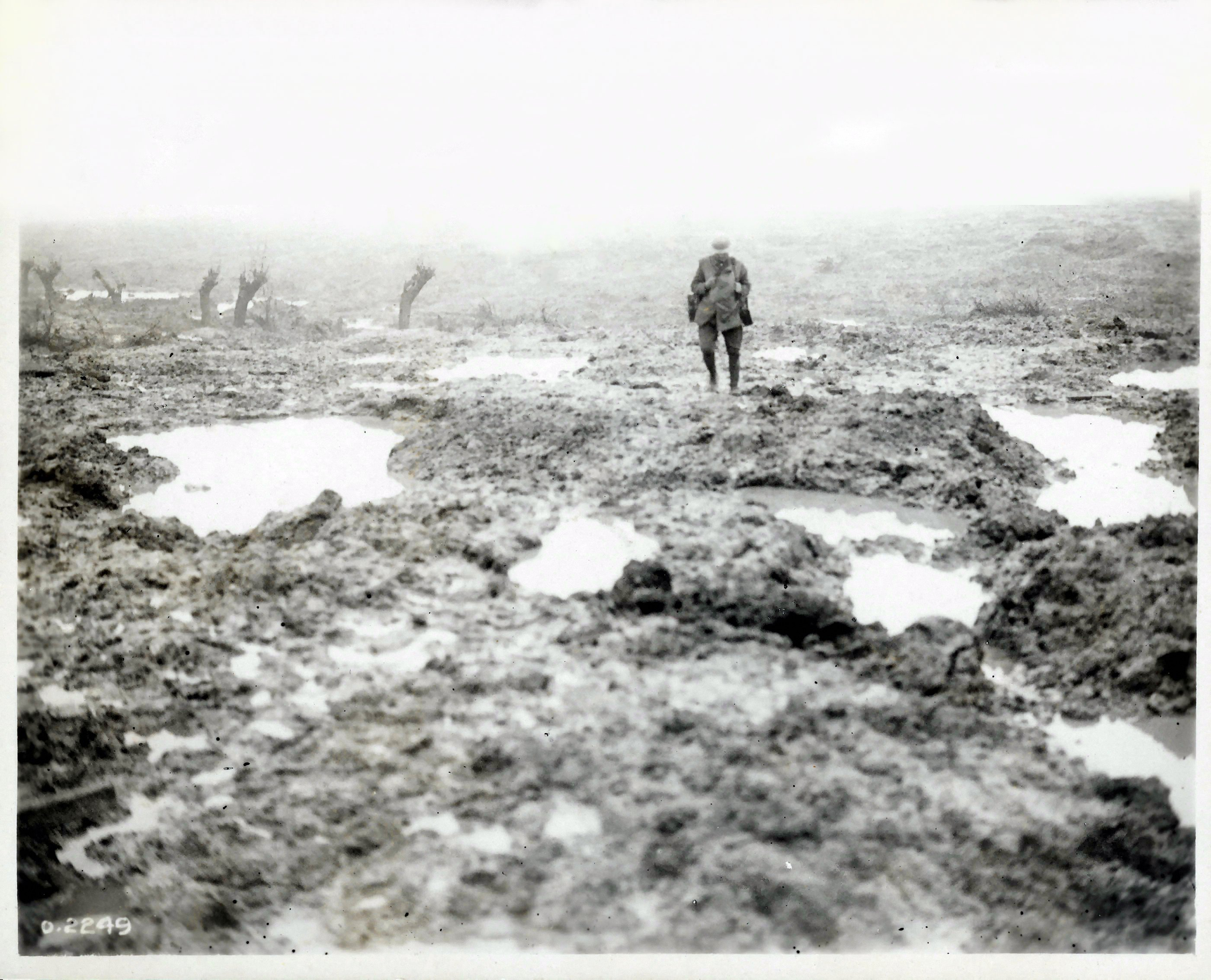
Passchendaele mud

The division returned to the line for the Second Battle of Passchendaele (26 October). As it arrived, the weather broke, the brigade came under heavy shellfire as it assembled in the Poelcapelle area, and was forced to jump off from a line of flooded craters and struggle forward behind an inadequate barrage that advanced too quickly. The attack was led by 2/2nd and 2/3rd Bns of 173rd Bde with 2/1st Bn in support. 2/2nd Battalion took some pillboxes at Cameron House but was partially forced back by a counter-attack; 2/3rd Bn became mired in mud attempting to take Spider crossroads and were driven back to their start line, losing their CO. 2/4th Battalion was detailed to leap-frog through and take 173rd Bde's second objective, but the exhausted men, with hardly a rifle able to fire because of the mud, only took one post, at Tracas Farm, before being pushed back to their start line. The battalion suffered so many casualties that it had to be reorganised as a single company. 173rd Brigade was relieved by 174th Bde, which continued attacking on 30 October. After the failure of the battle, 58th Division continued to hold the line at Polecapelle through the winter months.

=== Reorganisation ===
58th Division was transferred to the south in January 1918. Here it spent time digging defences, converting former French positions into the newly devised defences in depth. The BEF was suffering a manpower shortage, and its brigades were reduced from a four-battalion to a three-battalion establishment. In 173rd Bde this resulted in 2/1st Bn being broken up on 31 January and its men drafted to the other battalions of the brigade and to 1/4th Bn in 56th Division. At the same time 1/3rd Bn was transferred in from 56th Division to be amalgamated with 2/3rd Bn, and thereafter became simply 3rd Bn.

=== Spring Offensive ===
When the German spring offensive opened on 21 March 1918, 58th Division was positioned astride the River Oise with 173rd Bde north of the river at La Fère. It was covering a wide frontage of about 5000 yards with 2/2nd Londons in the Forward Zone in a series of four company outposts on the line of the St. Quentin Canal, and 2/4th Londons behind them in the Battle Zone, where each company was in a 'defended locality' with a central keep and outlying redoubts. The wide spaces between outposts and defended localities were covered by the brigade machine gun company. General Oskar von Hutier directed four German divisions under Von Gayl against this front. 173rd Brigade's Signal HQ was knocked out early in the bombardment and no orders went out, but 2/4th Bn deployed to their positions on their own initiative. The whole position was shrouded in mist, aiding the German infiltration tactics. They crossed the canal by plank bridges and cleared the Forward Zone by midday, virtually wiping out 2/2nd Bn except A Company at Travercy, then 2/4th Bn in the Battle Zone were engaged as the mist lifted. This battalion held on until nightfall, supported by detachments of 3rd Bn from reserve and the divisional pioneers of 1/4th Bn Suffolk Regiment. Most of C Company 2/4th Bn at the Triangle locality, supported by a single 18-pounder field gun, were eventually captured, but by midnight the rest of the battalion had withdrawn in good order across the Crozat Canal. Only the cut-off A Company 2/2nd Bn held out, until forced to surrender at 01.00 on 23 March.

While the 8th Londons of 174th Bde held the canal, the three companies of 2/4th Bn dug in on the Vouel Line behind them. The German attack was renewed in the afternoon of 22 March, but the canal was held until nightfall, the only attacks on the Vouel Line coming from German artillery ranged in by spotter aircraft. The following day, the Vouel Line (now the British front line) became crowded with French troops from a failed counter-attack on the canal, while the left flank was 'in the air' after the retreat of 18th (Eastern) Division. The position became untenable at mid-day, and 2/4th Bn and the French troops had to make a fighting withdrawal to the partly dug Green Line about 1500 yards back. With continued pressure on the open left flank, 173rd Bde was forced to withdraw again, beyond Viry-Noureuil. By now the fighting strength of 2/4th Londons was about 120 men, who came under the command of 8th Londons. However, the battalion's second-in-command, Major Grover, led up a scratch force of 280 clerks, cooks and drivers from the brigade's rear areas. By nightfall, 'Grover's Force' blocked the way to Chauny on the St Quentin Canal, with the combined 2/4th and 8th Londons to his left and the 18th Entrenching Battalion (formed from disbanded battalions of 18th Division) to his right astride the canal.

The mixed force under 173rd Bde held out on the fourth day of the battle until the afternoon, when they made a planned withdrawal, and by 16.30 had retired across the Oise to join the rest of 58th Division. Here a composite 'Fusilier Battalion' was formed under Lt-Col Dann of the 2/4th, with a company drawn from each of the 2/2nd, 3rd, 2/4th and 8th Londons, which held the river crossings until relieved on the night of 25/26 March. Out of the line, Grover's Force and the Fusilier Battalion were reorganised, so that the Fusilier Battalion now represented the whole of 173rd Bde, to which the 12th Londons (175th Bde) and the 18th Entrenching Bn were attached.

=== Villers Bretonneux ===
58th Division was relieved by the French on 2/3 April and was moved by rail to cover Villers-Bretonneux against the continuing German advance. The battalions were replenished with drafts, 2/2nd Bn receiving three companies of the disbanded 12th Bn Middlesex Regiment from 18th Entrenching Bn, and 2/4th Bn two companies from 16th Entrenching Bn (mostly from the disbanded 6th King's Own Yorkshire Light Infantry from the 14th (Light) Division), Many of these drafts were very young recruits sent out from England. After a period working on defences, sometimes under fire, the brigade went back into the front line on 17–18 April.

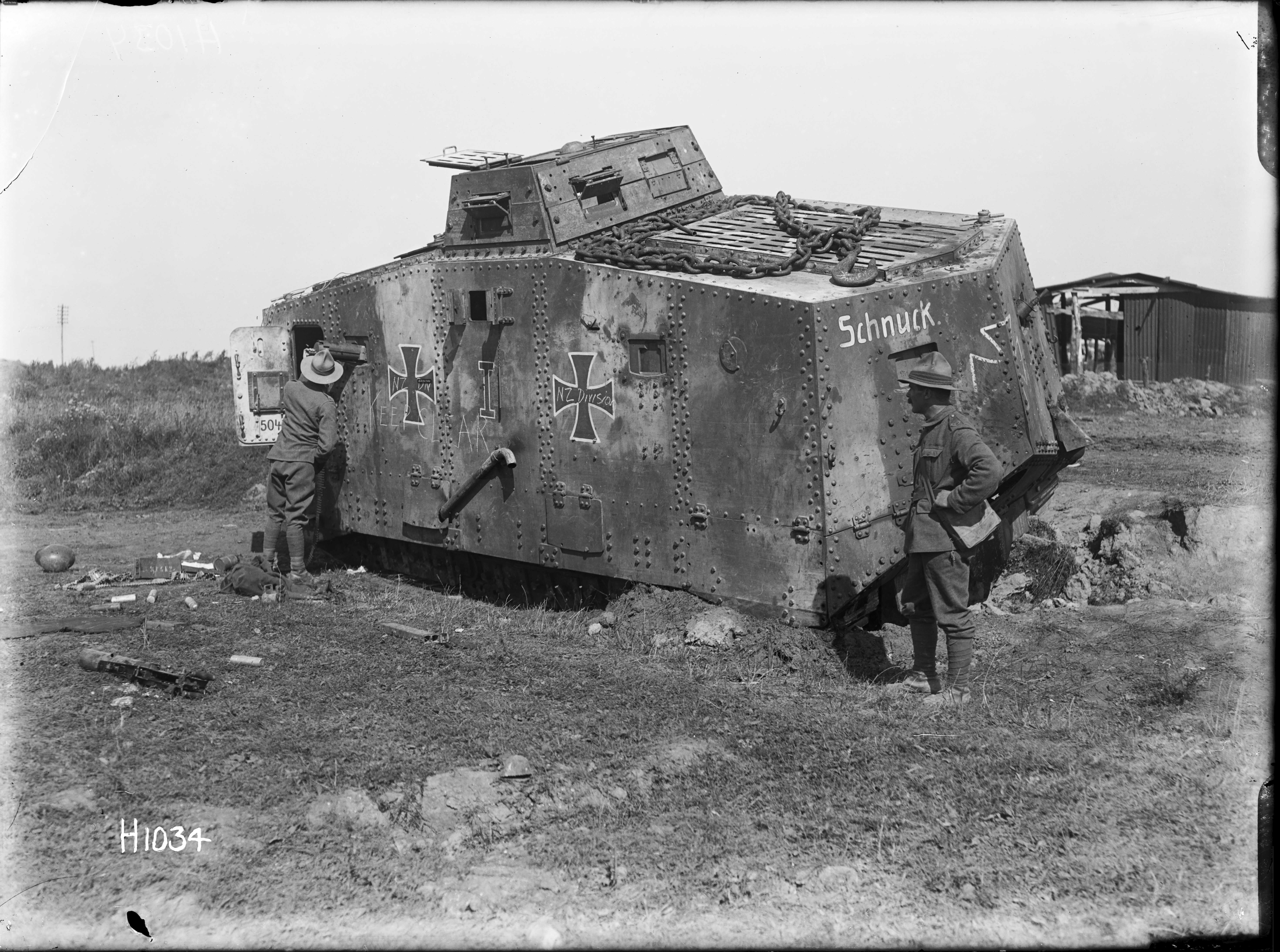
Knocked-out the German A7V tank Schnuck.

The battered 173rd Bde was not involved with the rest of the division in the First Battle of Villers-Bretonneux, but was holding the division's front line (3rd Bn right, 2/2nd Bn centre and 2/4th Bn left) when the German Second Army launched the Second Battle of Villers-Bretonneux on 24 April. The German barrage fell at 04.00, including a high proportion of gas shells, and caused serious casualties to the defending companies. The attack came at different times. At Hangard Wood in the centre, 2/2nd Bn was attacked at about 06.00, and the SOS rockets calling for artillery support could not be seen due to the mist. When a message got through to the British guns their fire fell short, on the defenders. Nevertheless, the three front line companies held their position. 2/4th Battalion on the left was attacked out of the mist by six German A7V tanks and fell back, uncovering the flank of 2/2nd Bn. C Company of 2/2nd was sent up as reinforcements, carrying extra ammunition, but the infiltrating German infantry had almost cut off D Company and were working round behind 2/2nd Bn's HQ. However, the 2/4th quickly realised that the tanks were manoeuvring ineffectually, so they rallied at the company HQ line and then fell back slowly. They inflicted heavy casualties on the three following waves of German infantry, finally halting them at the Cachy Switch trench. 2/4th Bn's support company was almost cut off but also fought its way back to the Switch. An 18-pounder gun was manhandled to 2/4th Bn's HQ, where it drove back the remaining German tanks. 3rd Bn continued to hold its position. Once the mist cleared a second German attack was broken up by artillery fire. Further to the left, Villers-Bretonneux had been captured but a counter-attack the same night regained the ruins and most of the lost ground.

The brigade spent the summer of 1918 working on the defences in front of Amiens. Although its battalions received some drafts of recruits from home they were never made up to full strength. During spells in the line the battalions carried out a number of patrols into No man's land to train the young soldiers. At this period the 1918 flu pandemic caused more casualties than the Germans.

=== Chipilly ===
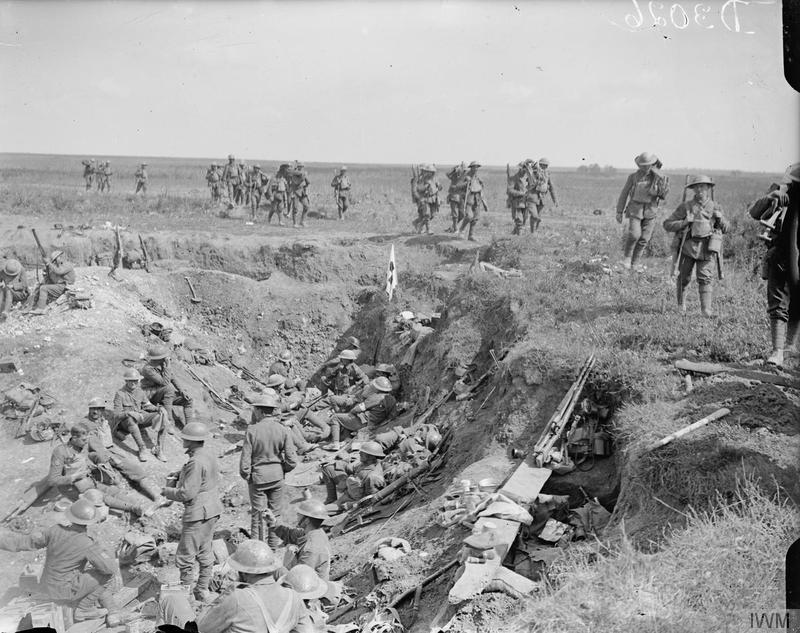
Regimental aid post near Chipilly, 10 August 1918.

For the opening attack of the Hundred Days Offensive (the Battle of Amiens) on 8 August 1918, 174th Bde was given the initial objective of capturing Malard Wood, after which 173rd Bde would pass through to take the vital Chipilly Ridge overlooking a bend in the River Somme and flanking the battlefield. 173rd Brigade moved off in 'artillery formation' through the German barrage that fell behind 174th Bde, with 3rd Bn on the right, 2/4th Bn on the left, and 2/2nd Bn in reserve. During this advance the battalion HQ staff of 2/4th Bn were wounded by shellfire. In the morning mist this battalion drifted to the left of its intended line of advance, followed by 2/2nd Bn. They also had to deal with isolated pockets of resistance, and their supporting tanks got lost in the mist. At 08.30, as the leading companies reached the far edge of Malard Wood, the mist began to clear and they were brought to a halt by machine gun fire across the gully in front of the wood. The CO of 2/2nd Bn, Lt-Col Miller, began to reorganise the mixed-up battalions and completed the clearance of Malard Wood. Aircraft erroneously reported British troops on Chipilly Ridge, so when 2/2nd began the second phase of the attack at 15.00 no artillery fire was brought onto the ridge. Without artillery support the attackers could only reach the lower slopes of Chipilly Ridge. 2/2nd Londons were forced back to Malard Wood, where the brigade dug in. Casualties in this debacle had been very heavy.

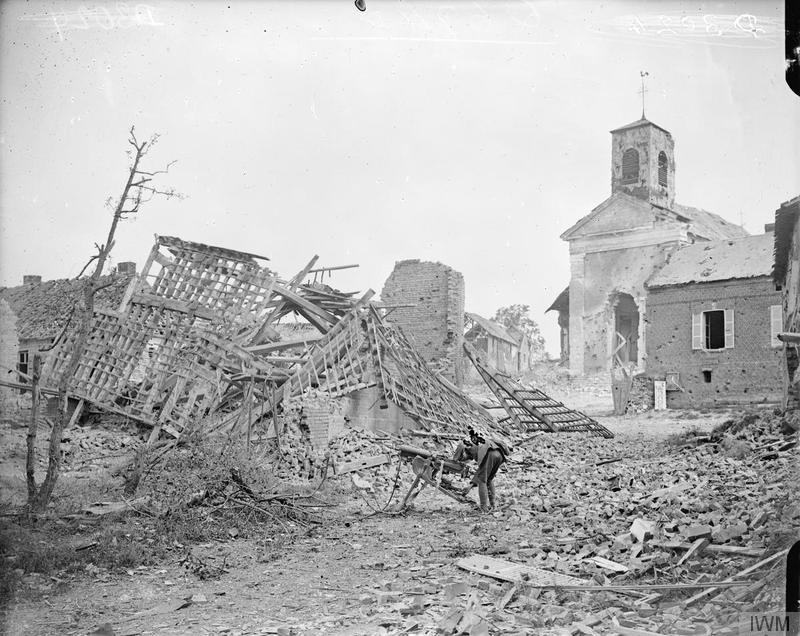
The ruins of Chipilly after its capture

The failure to take Chipilly Ridge resulted in heavy casualties to the troops to the left of 58th Division who were overlooked by this feature. The division therefore made a second attack on 9 August. Orders arrived late and 173rd Bde attacked from an assembly trench that turned out to be no more than a string of shell-holes, and behind a misdirected barrage. The attacking troops were controlled by Lt-Col Miller of 2/3nd Bn, who disposed them with 3nd Bn on the right, 2/4th in the centre and 2/2nd on the left, with 2/10th Londons (from 175th Bde) in reserve. Supporting troops of the 131st US Infantry were rushed up on the left but were not yet in line when the creeping barrage began, so 173rd Bde was enfiladed from Chipilly village. Under heavy fire and taking serious casualties, the 2/4th dug in under the shelter of the Chipilly gully. Before nightfall, the 2/10th Londons and 131st US Infantry managed to clear Chipilly village and 173rd Bde finally dislodged the defenders from the ridge.

The battalions had lost heavily over the two-day battle, and at one point 2/4th Bn had five acting COs in 12 hours. Between 10 and 22 August they were brought up to strength with large drafts from various London battalions and some seasoned soldiers from 14th (Light) Division.

=== Bapaume ===
The Second Battle of Bapaume opened on 22 August and was continued with a night attack on 23/24 August, in which 173rd Bde supported 175th Bde and 47th Division. A dawn attack on 25 August found the German positions empty, and 2/4th Londons was sent forward with a Troop of the Northumberland Hussars and sections of the Royal Field Artillery and Machine Gun Corps as an advanced guard to re-establish contact with the enemy. In these unusual conditions of open warfare, the battalion marched in column up a road until the cavalry contacted the enemy at Billon Wood, when the companies deployed and attacked, supported by 2/2nd and 3rd Bns. Despite intense shelling, the brigade was established on the far side of the wood by the end of the day.

The Brigade entered Maricourt the following day, but with its flanks 'in the air' it fell back to a line just short of the village. The attack was renewed on 27 August, with 2/4th Bn in support of 3rd Londons. The defence was sporadic, and the two battalions passed through the village, which 2/2nd Bn mopped up in the afternoon. The following day 2.2nd Bn led the attack with 3rd Bn in support, taking Clapham Farm by afternoon. The brigade was then rested until 1 September, when at short notice a dawn attack was made towards Bouchavesnes. 3rd Londons on the left and 2/4th on the right followed the creeping barrage, overcame some resistance at the edge of the village, and was on its final objective by 10.45. 58th Division was then relieved in the line.

=== Épehy ===
After a period in reserve, the 58th Division returned to the offensive, and on 7 September 173rd Bde was brought up by buses into divisional reserve. After an unsuccessful attack by 174th Bde the very weak 173rd Bde took over the attack on 10 September, towards the villages round Épehy on the last ridge before the Canal du Nord, forming the Hindenburg outpost positions. 2/2nd Bn led with the 2/4th in close support towards Pézières while 3rd Bn went for Épehy. 2/4th Londons were then to turn south and pop up between the two leading battalions. The brigade went forward behind creeping barrage at 05.15, in bad weather. The two villages were taken, but considerable opposition was met from the German Alpine Corps, and the attack lost cohesion in the ruined streets. The barrage had not dealt with machine gun nests and the brigade (now only about 900 strong) was too weak to mop them up unaided. 2/2nd Londons found themselves surrounded and had to fight their way back. A second attempt was made at 13.00 to establish a line between the two villages, using infiltration tactics and the brigade's light Stokes mortars, but with no better success.

=== Reorganisation ===
Despite the successes of the Hundred Days Offensive, the BEF's manpower crisis was now severe, and on 12 September 1918 the remnant of the 2/4th Bn was amalgamated into 2/2nd Bn and its place in the brigade filled by 2/24th Bn (Queen's), which had been brought back to the Western Front from the 60th (2/2nd London) Division in Palestine and had been attached to 66th (2nd East Lancashire) Division since July.

The Épehy position was now to be taken by deliberate assault (the Battle of Épehy). 173rd Brigade renewed the division's attack on Pézières, A, B, and D Companies of 2/2nd Bn and two tanks being detailed to take the first two objectives, with 2/24th Bn in close support for mopping up and 3rd Bn to take a small area on the right. The attack was scheduled for 16 September but postponed until the 18th. There was no preliminary bombardment, but the creeping barrage began with three minutes on the start line and then lifted 100 yards every four minutes. The pre-dawn attack in drizzle went well, despite the Alpine troops' resistance, and within an hour 2/2nd Bn had reached the railway embankment beyond Pézières (the first objective). At 07.00 the whole battalion moved on towards is second objective, which it took by 09.10, but 2/24th was held up by a number of strongpoints. These were cleared up by 2/2nd and 3rd Bns at 21.00, but the Germans in Poplar Trench held out until mid-morning the following day. 173rd Brigade was relieved on 20 September.

=== Pursuit to the Scheldt ===
58th Division returned to the line north of the Scarpe between Lens and Loos on 30 September. On 2 October it was found that the Germans had withdrawn on this front during the night and 173rd Bde was pushed forward through the day. After midnight it pushed on again until its patrols found the new German defences at the Oppy–Mericourt–Pont á Vendin Line.

The Germans withdrew further to the Drocourt–Queant Switch Line on 9 October, but the village of Noyelles still held out, until 173rd Bde helped 37th Bde to capture it. On 11 October, the brigade received its orders late, but advanced about a mile with the support of the divisional artillery to take Harnes Fosses (coal-mines) without opposition. The following day 173rd and 175th Bdes took Harnes and the Annay Switch line, and on 13 October pushed on through Annay and advanced to within a thousand yards of the Haute Deûle canal. Patrols that night found the canal strongly held.

The German withdrawal continued on 15 October and 2/2nd Londons established footbridges over the canal. 173rd Brigade was then in divisional reserve while the pursuit continued. By 20 October, German resistance was slight; the brigade's advance was only held up by fire from a small village to its flank. The following day it pushed on to the Scheldt and established posts in the villages overlooking the river. During the night the 504th Field Company, Royal Engineers, built a footbridge over a destroyed road bridge, but patrols were unable to cross until the morning, when a few of 2/24th Londons got across supported by a field battery and machine guns. They were driven back. Next, 504th Fd Co made a raft of barrels and floorboards taken from the local brewery and two companies of 2/2nd Londons tried and failed to get across. Shelling drove the brigade's support battalion back out of its position. However, Brig-Gen Corkran had gathered valuable information about the terrain.

58th Division then thinned out its outposts along the river, leaving 174th Bde, plus one battalion from 173rd, in position. On 8 November, the enemy began to pull back from the Scheldt and 2/2nd Londons crossed with 174th Bde. The advance then continued until 11 November, when the Armistice with Germany came into force.

== Disbandment ==
After the Armistice, 58th Division remained in the Péruwelz area of Belgium. Education and training courses were carried out for men preparing for demobilisation, and skilled tradesmen and miners were the first to be sent home. 2/2nd Londons were disbanded on 26 February. At the beginning of March 1919 the dwindling division concentrated round Leuze, and on 12 March the three brigade HQs were disbanded and amalgamated into a single 58th Division Group HQ.

== Second World War ==
Second Line TF units and formations were not reformed after the war. However, the 58th Division and the 173rd Brigade were used during the Second World War for 'phantom formations' as part of Operation Fortitude. They were chosen on the basis of Ultra reports that showed the Germans believed a 58th Infantry Division existed in the vicinity of Windsor. This misidentification was then supported by simulated radio traffic and by fictitious reports from double agents working for the British Security Service, MI5.

As part of Fourth Army's II Corps, the 'division' took the role of a mountain trained assault formation in 'Fortitude North' (HQ: Aberlour) and the role of follow up unit in 'Fortitude South' (HQ: Gravesend). It was disposed of by announcing that the division had moved to Hertfordshire and been disbanded in April 1945.

The formation's insignia, a stag's face full on a black square was chosen to support the division's fictional back-story, that it had been formed in the Scottish Highlands around cadres from combat experienced Highland regiments.

== Memorial ==
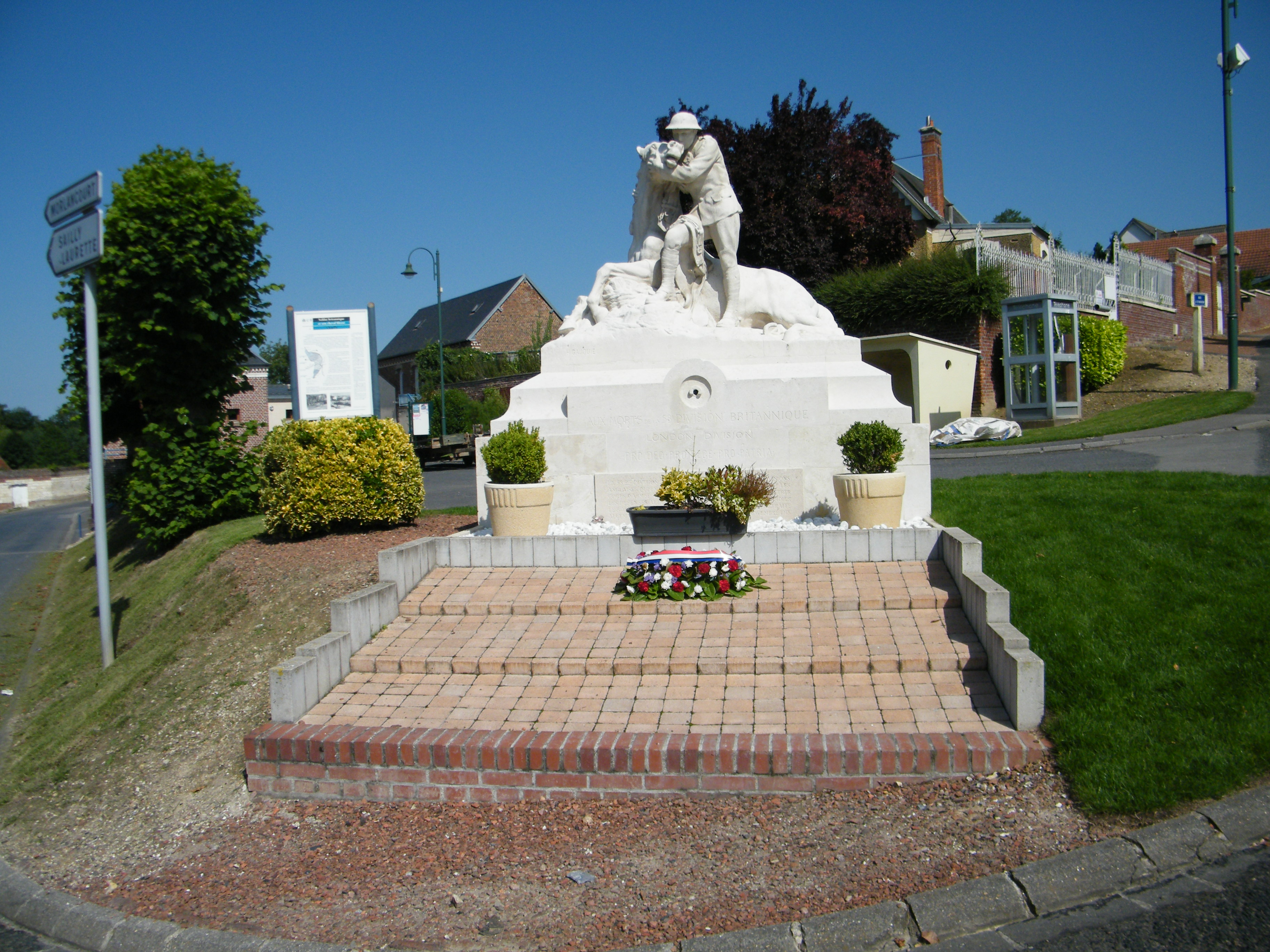
58th Division's monument at Chipilly

The 58th Divisional Memorial, depicting a wounded horse sculpted by Henri Gauquie, is at Chipilly. It was paid for from the profits of the divisional entertainment canteen and barber shop, the remainder funding a Territorial charity that still exists today.

== Commanders ==
The following officers commanded the 173rd (3/1st London) Brigade during its existence:

- Col H. Cholmondeley, CB, appointed 10 May 1915
- Brig-Gen G.P.S. Hunt, from 9 January 1916
- Lt-Col P.W. Beresford (2/3rd Londons), acting on 20 April 1917
- Brig-Gen Bernard Freyberg, VC, from 21 April 1916; wounded 19 September 1917
- Lt-Col W.R.H Dann (2/4th Londons), acting from 19 September 1917
- Brig-Gen R.B. Worgan, from 3 October 1917
- Brig-Gen C.E. Corkran, from 22 July 1918
