= 178th (2/1st Nottinghamshire and Derbyshire) Brigade =

Military unit

The 178th (2/1st Nottinghamshire and Derbyshire) Brigade was an infantry brigade of the British Army. The brigade saw active service during the First and the Second World Wars.

== First World War ==
The brigade was raised during the First World War. It was formed as a Territorial Force duplicate of the 139th (1/1st Nottinghamshire and Derbyshire) Brigade originally from those men in the Territorial Force who had agreed, at the outbreak of war, to not serve overseas. Assigned to the 59th (2nd North Midland) Division, the brigade saw service on the Western Front. The brigade saw service at Passchendaele, Cambrai and during Operation Michael, part of the German spring offensive.

=== Order of battle ===
- 2/5th Battalion, Sherwood Foresters
- 2/6th Battalion, Sherwood Foresters
- 2/7th Battalion, Sherwood Foresters
- 2/8th Battalion, Sherwood Foresters
- 174th Machine Gun Company, Machine Gun Corps
- 175th Machine Gun Company, Machine Gun Corps
- 178th Trench Mortar Battery
- 36th Garrison Guard Battalion, Northumberland Fusiliers, became 36th Battalion 16 July 1918
- 11th Garrison Guard Battalion, Royal Scots Fusiliers, became 11th Battalion 16 July 1918
- 2nd Garrison Guard Battalion, Royal Irish Regiment, became 8th Garrison Battalion 25 May 1918
- 25th Garrison Guard Battalion, Cheshire Regiment
- 13th Garrison Battalion, Duke of Wellington's Regiment, became 13th Battalion 16 July 1918

== Second World War ==
The brigade number was reactivated again in the later stages of the Second World War as the 178th Infantry Brigade. The brigade was formed on 21 April 1945 in the United Kingdom, shortly before Victory in Europe Day and the end of the war in Europe, for the reception and retraining of personnel who were returning from fighting overseas, who were temporarily unfit from wounds suffered or other medical causes. The brigade was assigned to 45th Division, and disbanded on 11 August 1945.
