= 71st Division (United Kingdom) =

- Active: November 1916 - April 1918
- Country: United Kingdom
- Branch: British Army
- Type: Infantry
- Role: Home Defence and training

Commanders
- Notable commanders: Major-General Hon H.A. Lawrence; Major-General C.J. Blomfield

71st Division was a short-lived infantry division of the British Army during the First World War. It served in the Home Defence forces and never went overseas.

== Home Defence ==
On the outbreak of the First World War, the Territorial Force (TF) immediately mobilised for home defence, but shortly afterwards (31 August 1914), its units were authorised to raise 2nd battalions formed from those men who had not volunteered for, or were not fit for, overseas service, together with new volunteers, while the 1st Line went overseas to supplement the Regulars. Early in 1915 the 2nd Line TF battalions were also raised to full strength to form new divisions, and began to form Reserve (3rd Line) units to supply drafts. The remaining Home Service men were separated out in May 1915 to form brigades of Coast Defence Battalions (termed Provisional Battalions from June 1915).

=== 6th Provisional Brigade ===
6th Provisional Brigade was formed mainly from details of regiments from London and East Anglia, with the following composition:

- 6th Provisional Yeomanry Squadron
- 6th Provisional Cyclist Company
- 6th Provisional Battery and Ammunition Column Royal Field Artillery
- 6th Provisional Brigade Ammunition Column RFA
- 6th Provisional Field Company Royal Engineers
- 61st Provisional Battalion from home service details of 4th and 5th Battalions Norfolk Regiment
- 100th Provisional Battalion from home service details of 173rd (3/1st London) Brigade (3/1st, 3/2nd. 3/3rd and 3/4th (City of London) Battalion, the London Regiment) (Note: 1st, 2nd, 4th and 7th (City of London) Battalion, London Regiment by 1 January 1916.)
- 101st Provisional Battalion from home service details of 3rd, 5th, 6th and 8th (City of London) Battalions, London Regiment
- 102nd Provisional Battalion from home service details of 9th, 10th and 12th (County of London) Battalions, London Regiment
- 6th Provisional Field Ambulance Royal Army Medical Corps
- 6th Provisional Brigade Train Army Service Corps (previously Welsh Divisional Train, left behind when the 53rd (Welsh) Division embarked for Gallipoli in July 1915)

By July 1916 the brigade was under the control of Northern Army of Home Forces, with its battalions billeted across Suffolk as follows:

- Brigade Headquarters: Saxmundham
- 61st Provisional Bn: Benacre
- 100th Provisional Bn: Aldeburgh
- 101st Provisional Bn: Southwold
- 102nd Provisional Bn: Aldeburgh

66th Provisional Battalion from home service details of 5th (part) and 6th Battalion, Essex Regiment at Darsham, attached to 3rd Provisional Bde, later transferred into 6th Provisional Bde.

== 71st Division formed ==
Late in 1916 the War Office decided to form three new home-service divisions and 71st was the first of these, assembling in Hampshire and Surrey in November. The division was based on 6th Provisional Bde, which moved from Suffolk and provided four infantry battalions and many of the support units. (On 1 January 1917 these all received new designations and numbers.) In addition, 190th (2nd Durham Light Infantry) Brigade, left over after the earlier disbandment of 63rd (2nd Northumbrian) Division, was brought from Catterick and renumbered. 64th (2nd Highland) Division at Catterick also provided a number of artillery batteries. The division had the following composition:

=== Staff ===
- General Officer Commanding: Major-General Hon H.A. Lawrence (6 November 1916 – 12 February 1917)
  Maj-Gen C.J. Blomfield (12 February–17 July 1917)
  Maj-Gen A.G. Dallas (17 July 1917 – 1 March 1918)
- General Staff Officer Grade 1: Lieutenant-Colonel H.R. Blore (30 October 1916 – 31 March 1917)
  Lt-Col R.M. Johnson (31 March–10 October 1917)
  Lt-Col W.S. Whetherly (10 October 1917 – 6 March 1918)
- Assistant-Adjutant and Quartermaster-General: Lt-Col J.M. Home (27 October–10 April 1918)
- HQ: Farnham

=== 212th Brigade ===
212 Brigade was drawn from 6th Provisional Bde:

- GOC: Brigadier-General Hon C.G. Fortescue (29 November 1916–24 November)
  Brigadier-General H.W. Cobham (24 November 1917 – 12 February 1918)
- HQ: Guildford
- 61st Provisional Bn: became 11th Bn Norfolk Regiment (TF); left October 1917 and disbanded 20 December 1917

- 100th Provisional Bn: amalgamated 1 January 1917 with 102nd Provisional Bn to form 29th (City of London) Bn London Regiment (TF); transferred to 226th Mixed Brigade (see below)
- 101st Provisional Bn: amalgamated 1 January 1917 with 103rd Provisional Bn to form 30th (City of London) Bn London Regiment (TF); transferred to 226th Mixed Brigade (see below)
- 249th Bn Training Reserve: joined 9 July 1917; became 51st (Graduated) Bn Bedfordshire Regiment 24 October 1917
- 250th Bn TR: joined 9 July 1917; became 52nd (Graduated) Bn Middlesex Regiment 1 November 1917
- 52nd (Graduated) Bn Royal Sussex Regiment, joined from 214 Brigade early November 1917

=== 213th Brigade ===
213 Brigade was newly formed:

- GOC: Brigadier-General W.MacL. Campbell
- HQ: Aldershot
- 16th (Home Service) Bn Queen's (Royal West Surrey) Regiment: newly formed.
- 25th (Garrison) Bn Middlesex Regiment: originally formed from depot companies of 18th, 19th and 26th (Public Works Pioneers) Bns Middlesex Regiment; left for Hong Kong 22 December 1916.
- 18th (Home Service) Bn Hampshire Regiment: newly formed 26 December 1916 to replace 25th Middlesex; disbanded 21 December 1917
- 66th Provisional Bn: became 16th Bn Essex Regiment1 January 1917; disbanded 21 December 1917
- 252nd Bn TR: joined 9 July 1917; became 52nd (Graduated) Bn Bedfordshire Regiment24 October 1917
- 253rd Bn TR: joined 17 September 1917; became 51st (Graduated) Bn Royal Sussex Regiment 27 October 1917
- 52nd (Graduated) Bn Queen's (Royal West Surrey) Regiment, joined from 214 Brigade

=== 214th Brigade ===
214 Brigade was formed by renumbering 190th (2/1st Durham Light Infantry) Bde:

- GOC: Brigadier-General W.C. Ross (1 November–11 December 1916)
  Brigadier-General C.H.T. Lucas (11 December 1916 – 14 April 1917)
  Brigadier-General F.J. Duncan (14 April–8 November 1917)
  Brigadier-General L.A.E. Price-Davies, VC (8 November 1917
- HQ: Whitchurch
- 2/6th Bn Durham Light Infantry; transferred to 226th Mixed Brigade (see below)
- 2/7th Bn Durham Light Infantry
- 2/8th Bn Durham Light Infantry; disbanded 10 December 1917
- 255th Bn TR: joined 9 July 1917; became 52nd (Graduated) Bn Royal Sussex Regiment 27 October 1917; to 212 Bde early November 1917
- 256th Bn TR: joined 17 September 1917; became 52nd (Graduated) Bn Queen's (Royal West Surrey) Regiment 24 October 1917; later to 213 Bde
- 2/1st Warwickshire Yeomanry (Cyclists) joined from 1st Mounted Brigade 26 October 1917
- 2/1st Hertfordshire Yeomanry (Cyclists) joined 26 October 1917
- 252nd Machine Gun Company Machine Gun Corps joined 9 November 1917
- 253rd Machine Gun Company MGC joined 9 November 1917
- XLIX Field Brigade RFA: newly formed (see below)
- 492nd (Home Counties) Field Company, Royal Engineers (see below) joined 12 February 1918; left late 1918 for Russia
- 71st Divisional Signal Company, RE (see below) joined 12 February 1918
- 302nd Field Ambulance (see below) joined 12 February 1918

=== Divisional mounted troops ===
- C Squadron 2/1st Bedfordshire Yeomanry: transferred from 68th (2nd Welsh) Division; absorbed into 1st Reserve Cavalry Regiment July 1917
- 6th Provisional Cyclist Company: became 71st Divisional Cyclist Company Army Cyclist Corps (Home Service)

=== Royal Artillery ===
- Brigadier-General Royal Artillery: C.T. Caulfield (3 November 1916 – 21 November 1917)
  W.B. Browell (28 November 1917 – 25 February 1918)
- HQ: Basingstoke
- CCCL Field Brigade RFA:
  - A Battery (later 1208 Field Battery): formerly 6th Provisional Battery – 6 × 18-pounder QF guns
  - B Battery: formerly A/CCCXXI (2/1 Forfarshire Battery, 2nd/II Highland Field Brigade) from 64th (2nd Highland) Division – 6 x18-pdr
  - C (Howitzer) Battery: formerly A/CCCXX (2/1 Aberdeen Battery, 2nd/I Highland Field Brigade) from 64th Division; became A (H) Battery XLIX Field Brigade (see above) – 4 × QF 4.5-inch howitzer
- CCCLI Field Brigade RFA:
  - A Battery: formerly A/CCCXXII from 64th Division (previously V Reserve Brigade RFA) – 6 × 18-pdr
  - B Battery: newly formed – 6 × 18-pdr
  - C (Howitzer) Battery: newly formed; became B (H) Battery XLIX Field Brigade (see above) – 4 × 4.5 Howitzer
- 2/1st London Heavy Battery, Royal Garrison Artillery: joined 71st Division 9 March 1917 when 58th (2/1st London) Division went overseas); attached to 226th Mixed Brigade (see below)
- 2/2nd London Heavy Battery, RGA: joined 71st Division 9 March 1917); attached to 226th Mixed Brigade (see below)
- 71st Divisional Ammunition Column: formerly 6th Provisional Brigade Ammunition Column

=== Royal Engineers ===
- Commanding Royal Engineers: Lieutenant-Colonel J.L.V.S. Williams
- 2/1st Dundee Fortress Company, RE: became 548th Field Company
- 2/3rd Lancashire Fortress Company, RE: became 549th Field Company
- 6th Provisional Field Company, RE: became 645th (West Lancashire) Field Company; to 67th (2nd Home Counties) Division 26 October 1917
- 492nd (Home Counties) Field Company, RE: from 67th (2nd Home Counties) Division 26 October 1917; to 214th Bde (see above) 12 February 1918
- 6th Provisional Signal Section, RE: became 71st Divisional Signal Company; to 214th Bde (see above) 12 February 1918

=== Medical services ===
- 6th Provisional Field Ambulance RAMC:
  - A Section: became 301st (Welsh) Field Ambulance
  - B Section: became 303rd (Welsh) Field Ambulance
  - C Section: became 302nd (Welsh) Field Ambulance
- 104th Sanitary Section
- 56th Mobile Veterinary Section Army Veterinary Corps

=== Transport ===
- 71st Divisional Train:
  - 6th Provisional Brigade Company ASC: became 821st Horse Transport Company ASC
  - 822nd, 823rd and 824th HT Companies ASC: newly formed

== Home defence ==
In the first week of March 1917, the division moved back to the East Coast and concentrated at Colchester. It now formed part of Southern Army of Home Forces and was responsible for defence of the Essex coast from Mersea Island to Walton-on-the-Naze. In April, 226th Mixed Brigade (formerly 7th Provisional Brigade) at Clacton-on-Sea was attached to the Division.

The Military Service Act 1916 swept away the Home/Foreign service distinction, and all TF soldiers became liable for overseas service, if medically fit. Henceforth part of the role of the Home Service divisions was physical conditioning to render men fit for drafting overseas, alongside units of the Training Reserve. 'Graduated Battalions' of the Training Reserve were organised in four companies according to age, from 18 to 19 years. Recruits progressed from one to another company every three months, so that every three months there was a company of trained 19-year-old men available for drafting overseas. In July 1917 it was decided that the Graduated Battalions could serve in a Home Defence role while completing their training. Between July and September 1917, six Graduated Battalions replaced other units in 71st Division, and in October these were affiliated to line regiments and adopted territorial designations.

In October 1917, 214 Bde was formed into a Special Brigade for service at Murmansk, for which it was filled up with men of A1 medical category, and had a field artillery brigade, cyclist battalions and machine-gun companies added to its strength. However, apart from its Royal Engineers it never went to Russia, and was still in 71st Division in early 1918.

== Disbandment ==
Towards the end of December 1917 the War Office decided to break up the three home service divisions. A number of battalions of 71st Division were disbanded that month, and on 12 January 1918 the War Office ordered the Commander-in-Chief, Home Forces, to break up the remainder of the division without delay. During February, 214th Special Brigade and 226th Mixed Brigade, with their attached troops, were transferred to 67th (2nd Home Counties) Division, and the six Graduated Battalions were transferred to 64th (2nd Highland) Division. CCCL Field Bde RFA moved to the School of Artillery at Larkhill Garrison and the Field Companies RE went overseas on active service. Disbandment of the remainder of the brigade headquarters and supporting units was complete by 8 April 1918.

The 71st Division title has never been reactivated.

== See also ==
- List of British divisions in World War I
