= 75th Brigade (United Kingdom) =

- Active: 1914–1919
- Country: United Kingdom
- Branch: British Army
- Type: Infantry Brigade
- Engagements: Battle of the Somme (1916); Battle of Messines (1917); 3rd Battle of Ypres (1917); German spring offensive (1918); Allied Hundred Days Offensive (1918)

The 75th Brigade was a formation of the British Army raised as part of the New Army also known as Kitchener's Army and served on the Western Front during the First World War.

== Formation ==
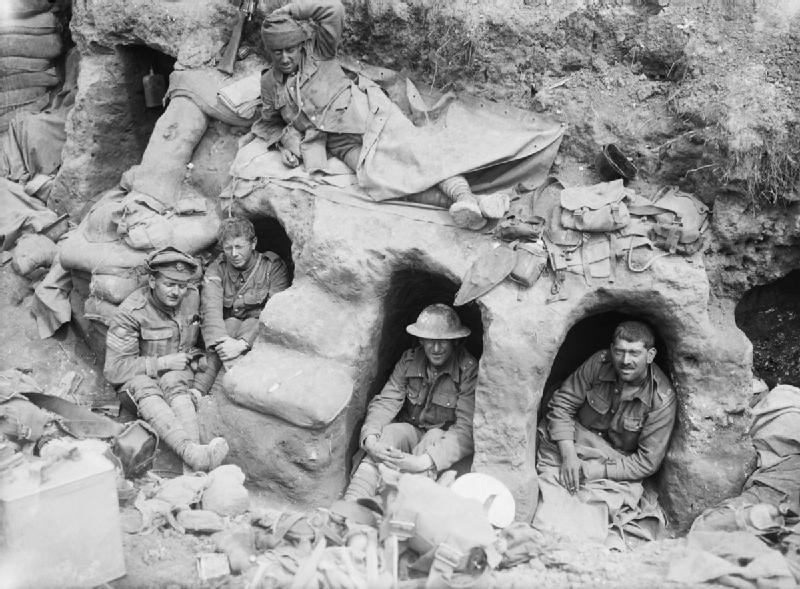
Tommies of the 8th (Service) Battalion, Border Regiment resting in shallow dugouts near Thiepval Wood during the Battle of the Somme, August 1916.

75th Brigade was raised in 1914 as part of 25th Division in the Third New Army ('K3') of 'Kitchener's Army'. 75th Brigade originally comprised volunteer battalions from North West England and fought on the Western Front for two years until it was virtually destroyed during the German spring offensive of 1918.

== Order of battle ==
75th Brigade was originally constituted as follows:

- 10th (Service) Battalion, Cheshire Regiment (transferred to 7th Bde, 25th Division, 26 October 1915)
- 11th (Service) Battalion, Cheshire Regiment
- 8th (Service) Battalion, Border Regiment (disbanded 7 July 1918)
- 8th (Service) Battalion, South Lancashire Regiment (disbanded 6 February 1918)
- 2nd Battalion, South Lancashire Regiment (Regular battalion transferred from 7th Bde, 25th Division, 26 October 1915)
- 1/6th Battalion, Cheshire Regiment (Territorial battalion joined 28 May 1918 and absorbed 11th Battalion)
- 75th Brigade Machine Gun Company (joined from UK 15 March 1916; transferred to 25th Battalion Machine Gun Corps 1 March 1918)
- 75th Trench Mortar Battery (75/1 joined 23 March 1916, 75/2 joined 29 April 1916, became 75th TM Battery by 16 June 1916; broken up 18 June 1918)

== Destroyed ==
After 25th Division was virtually destroyed at the Third Battle of the Aisne (27 May–6 June 1918), 75th Brigade's battalions were transferred to other divisions or reduced to training cadres. The divisional and brigade headquarters were ordered back to the UK to rebuild the division. 75th Brigade HQ embarked at Boulogne on 30 June and was joined on board by the training cadres of four battalions also returning to the UK to reform:

- 17th (Service) Battalion (1st City), King's (Liverpool) Regiment (previously with 30th Division; reduced to training cadre 14 May 1918)
- 6th (Service) Battalion, Green Howards (previously with 11th (Northern) Division; reduced to training cadre 14 May 1918; absorbed newly formed 19th Battalion Green Howards during August)
- 13th (Service) Battalion, Green Howards (previously with 40th Division; reduced to training cadre 6 May 1918; absorbed newly formed 19th Battalion Green Howards during August)
- 11th (Service) Battalion (1st South Down), Royal Sussex Regiment (previously with 39th Division; reduced to training cadre 23 May 1918; absorbed newly formed 13th Battalion, Royal West Kent Regiment during July)

== Reformed ==
In September 1918, the brigade was renumbered the 236th Brigade and sent to serve in North Russia. A new 75th Brigade was organised in France with the following Territorial battalions returned from 48th (South Midland) Division on the Italian Front:

- 1/8th Battalion, Royal Warwickshire Regiment
- 1/5th Battalion, Gloucestershire Regiment
- 1/8th Battalion, Worcestershire Regiment
- 75th Trench Mortar Battery (reformed 13 October 1918)

The reconstituted 75th Brigade fought with 25th Division in the final battles of the Hundred Days Offensive.

== Commanders ==
The following officers commanded 75th Brigade:

- Brigadier-General J.A.H. Woodward (from 19 September 1914)
- Brigadier-General H.F. Jenkins (from 8 February 1916)
- Brigadier-General E.St G. Pratt (from 10 July 1916)
- Brigadier-General H.B.D. Baird (from 27 November 1916)
- Brigadier-General H.T. Dobbin (from 8 February 1918)
- Brigadier-General C.C. Hannay (from 9 April 1918)
- Brigadier-General A.A. Kennedy (from 27 May 1918)
- Brigadier-General A.G. Pritchard (from 5 July 1918)
- Brigadier-General M.N. Turner (from 31 August 1918 - to 236th Bde 9 September 1918)

Reformed brigade:

- Brigadier-General M.E. Richardson (from 17 September 1918)
- Brigadier-General C.W. Frizell (from 1 October 1918)

== External sources ==
- The Regimental Warpath 1914–1918
- The Long, Long Trail
