= 15th (Scottish) Division =

WWI British Army unit

- 15th (Scottish) Division insignia
- Active: 1914 – 1919
- Country: United Kingdom
- Branch: British Army
- Type: Infantry
- Size: Division
- Engagements: First World War

The 15th (Scottish) Infantry Division was an infantry division of the British Army that served in the First World War. The 15th (Scottish) Division was formed from men volunteering for Kitchener's Army, and served from 1915 to 1918 on the Western Front. The division was later disbanded, after the war, in 1919.

== First World War ==
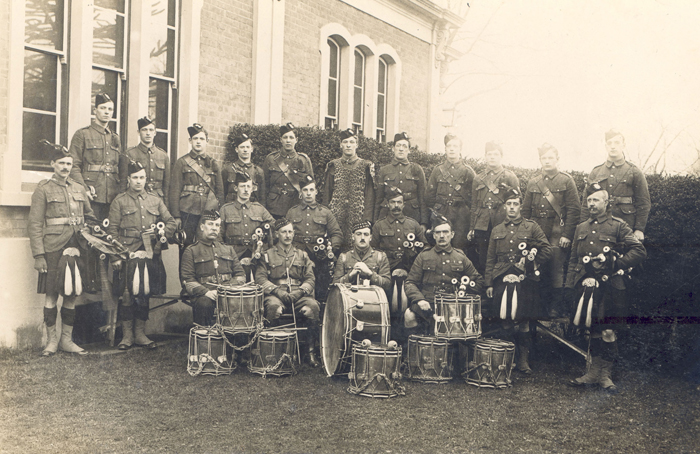
Band of the 13th (Service) Battalion, Royal Scots, Basingstoke, c. 1915.

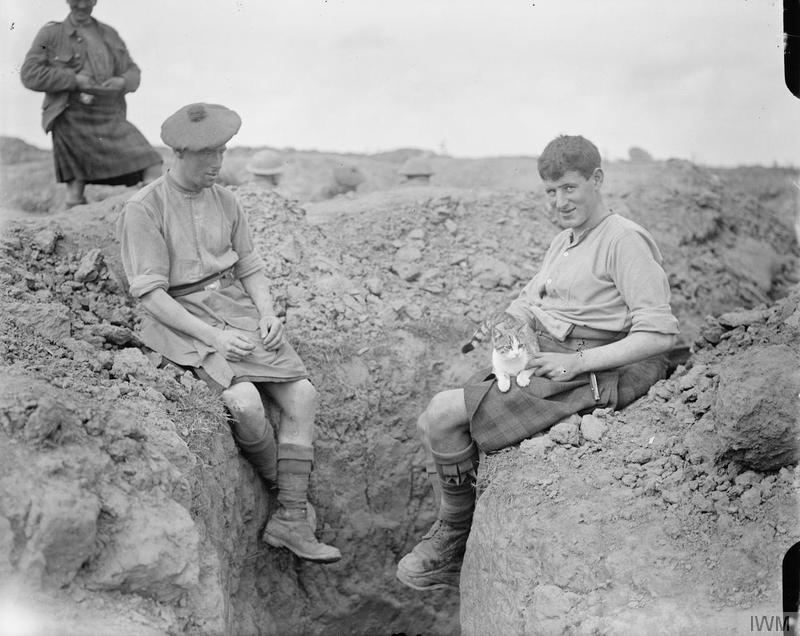
Two men of the 9th (Service) Battalion, Gordon Highlanders, with their pet cat at Martinpuich, France, 25 August 1916.

The division was a New Army unit formed in September 1914 as part of the K2 Army Group. The division moved to France in July 1915 and spent the duration of the First World War in action on the Western Front. The division fought in the Battle of Loos in which it seizing the village of Loos and Hill 70, the deepest penetration of the German positions by the six British divisions involved in the initial day. It later fought in the Battle of the Somme (1916) which included the battles of Pozières and Flers–Courcelette, the Battle of Arras 1917 and the Third Battle of Ypres later in the year.

The North Uist-born war poet Dòmhnall Ruadh Chorùna, a highly important figure in 20th century Scottish Gaelic literature, saw combat with the 7th (Service) Battalion, Queen's Own Cameron Highlanders, part of the division's 44th Infantry Brigade during the trench warfare along the Western Front and vividly described his war experiences in verse.

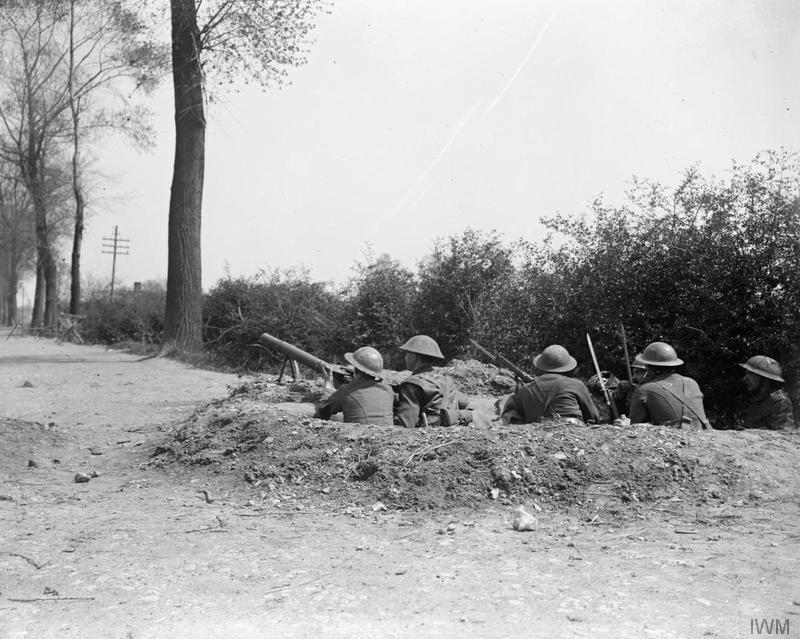
Outpost manned by men of the 11th (Service) Battalion, Argyll and Sutherland Highlanders, on a road beside the Lys Canal near Saint-Floris, France, 9 May 1918.

== General officers commanding ==
The division had the following commanders:

Appointed	Name
14 September 1914	Major-General A. Wallace
12 December 1914	Brigadier-General M. G. Wilkinson (acting)
15 December 1914	Major-General C. J. Mackenzie
15 March 1915	Brigadier-General F. E. Wallerstein (acting)
22 March 1915	Major-General F. W. N. McCracken
17 June 1917	Major-General H. F. Thullier
11 October 1917	Major-General H. L. Reed VC (sick 4 July 1918)
4 July 1918	Brigadier-General E. B. MacNaghten (acting)
9 July 1918	Major-General H. L. Reed VC

== Order of battle ==
15th (Scottish) Division

44th Infantry Brigade

- 9th Battalion, Black Watch (Royal Highlanders) (left February 1918)
- 8th Battalion, Seaforth Highlanders (Ross-shire Buffs, The Duke of Albany's)
- 9th Battalion, Gordon Highlanders (became divisional pioneer battalion in left on 12 January 1915)
- 10th Battalion, Gordon Highlanders (merged with 8th Battalion May 1916)
- 7th (Service) Battalion, Queen's Own Cameron Highlanders (joined January 1915 left, June 1918)
- 1/4th (City of Dundee) Battalion, Black Watch (Royal Highlanders) (joined November 1915 left January 1916)
- 8th (Service) Battalion, Gordon Highlanders (joined May 1916, merging with 10th Battalion, renamed as 8th/10th Battalion, left June 1918)
- 4th/5th Territorial Force (T.F.) Battalion, Black Watch (Royal Highlanders) (joined June 1918)
- 1/5th (T.F.) (Buchan and Formartine) Battalion, Gordon Highlanders (joined June 1918)
- 44th Machine Gun Company, Machine Gun Corps (M.G.C.) (joined 12 January 1916, left to move into 15th MG Battalion 17 March 1918)
- 44th Trench Mortar Battery (joined 25 June 1916)

45th Brigade

- 13th Battalion, Royal Scots (Lothian Regiment)
- 7th Battalion, Royal Scots Fusiliers (merged with 6th Battalion in May 1916, renamed as 6th/7th Battalion left February 1918)
- 6th Battalion, Queen's Own Cameron Highlanders
- 11th Battalion, Princess Louise's (Argyll and Sutherland Highlanders) (left June 1918)
- 1/8th (The Argyllshire) Battalion, Princess Louise's (Argyll and Sutherland Highlanders) (joined June 1918)
- 45th Machine Gun Company, M.G.C. (joined 12 February 1916, left to move into 15th MG Battalion 17 March 1918)
- 45th Trench Mortar Battery (joined June 1918)

46th Brigade

- 10th Battalion, Cameronians (Scottish Rifles)
- 12th Battalion, Highland Light Infantry (left February 1918)
- 7th Battalion, King's Own Scottish Borderers (merged with the 8th Battalion in May 1916, renamed the 7th/8th Battalion, left May 1916)
- 8th Battalion, King's Own Scottish Borderers (merged with the 7th Battalion in May 1916)
- 1/4th (Ross Highland) Battalion, Seaforth Highlanders (Ross-shire Buffs, The Duke of Albany's) (joined November 1915 left January 1916)
- 1/4th Battalion, Suffolk Regiment (joined November 1915 left February 1916)
- 9th Battalion, Black Watch (Royal Highlanders) (joined February 1918 left May 191')
- 1/9th (Highlanders) Battalion, Royal Scots (Lothian Regiment) (joined June 1918)
- 10th/11th Battalion, Highland Light Infantry (joined May 1916 left, February 1918)
- 46th Machine Gun Company, M.G.C. (joined 11 February 1916, left to move into 15th MG Battalion 17 March 1918)
- 46th Trench Mortar Battery (joined 20 June 1916)

Divisional Troop

- 7th Battalion, Bedfordshire Regiment (left February 1915)
- 7th Battalion, Leicestershire Regiment (left April 1915)
- 9th Battalion, Gordon Highlanders (Pioneer Battalion, January 1915)
- 11th Motor Machine Gun Battery (joined 23 June 1915, left 22 July 1916)
- 225th Machine Gun Company (joined 19 July 1917, left to move into 15th MG Battalion 17 March 1918)
- 15th Battalion M.G.C. (formed 17 March 1918)
- Divisional Mounted Troops
  - B Sqn, Westmorland and Cumberland Yeomanry (joined 23 June 1915, left 10 May 1916)
  - 15th Divisional Cyclist Company, Army Cyclist Corps (formed 23 December 1914, left 21 June 1916)
- 15th Divisional Train Army Service Corps
  - 138th, 139th, 140th and 141st Companies
- 27th Mobile Veterinary Section Army Veterinary Corps
- 216th Divisional Employment Company (joined 22 May 1917)

Royal Artillery

- LXX Brigade, Royal Field Artillery (R.F.A.)
- LXXI Brigade, R.F.A.
- LXXII Brigade, R.F.A. (left 20 January 1917)
- LXXIII (Howitzer) Brigade, R.F.A. (broken up 1–3 December 1916)
- 15th Divisional Ammunition Column R.F.A.
- 15th Heavy Battery, Royal Garrison Artillery (R.G.A. (raised with the division but moved independently to Gallipoli and was attached to 10th (Irish) Division in 1915)
- V.15 Heavy Trench Mortar Battery R.F.A. (joined November 1916, left 9 February 1918)
- X.15, Y.15 and Z.15 Medium Mortar Batteries R.F.A. (formed by June 1916; on 9 February 1918, Z broken up and distributed among X and Y batteries)

Royal Engineers

- 73rd Field Company
- 74th Field Company
- 91st Field Company (joined January 1915)
- 15th Divisional Signals Company

Royal Army Medical Corps

- 45th Field Ambulance
- 46th Field Ambulance
- 47th Field Ambulance
- 32nd Sanitary Section (left 29 March 1917)

== See also ==
- List of British divisions in World War I
