= Northern Army (Home Forces) =

Northern Army was a home service formation of the British Army during the First World War, responsible for the defence of East Anglia.

It was formed on 11 April 1916 under the command of Sir Bruce Hamilton, with headquarters at Mundford. The Army was composed of 1st Cyclist Division, 62nd (2nd West Riding) Division, 64th (2nd Highland) Division and four provisional brigades (3rd, 4th, 5th and 6th), with 68th (2nd Welsh) Division attached for training purposes. The Army was disbanded on 16 February 1918.
