= 174th (2/2nd London) Brigade =

Military unit

The 174th (2/2nd London) Brigade was a formation of the Territorial Force of the British Army. It was assigned to the 58th (2/1st London) Division and served on the Western Front during the First World War. The brigade was formed as a 2nd Line of the 168th (1/2nd London) Brigade.

== Formation ==
- 2/5th Battalion, London Regiment
- 2/6th Battalion, London Regiment (City of London Rifles)
- 2/7th (City of London) Battalion, London Regiment
- 2/8th Battalion, London Regiment (Post Office Rifles)
- 198th Machine Gun Company, Machine Gun Corps
- 174th Trench Mortar Battery
