= 236th Brigade (United Kingdom) =

- Active: 1918–1919
- Country: United Kingdom
- Branch: British Army
- Type: Infantry Brigade
- Engagements: North Russia 1918–19

236th Brigade (236th Bde) was a short-lived formation organised by the British Army at the close of World War I for service in North Russia.

== Formation ==
236th Brigade was formed in September 1918 by the redesignation of 75th Brigade, which had been raised in 1914 as part of 25th Division of 'Kitchener's Army'. 75th Brigade originally comprised volunteer battalions from North West England and had fought on the Western Front for two years until it was virtually destroyed during the German spring offensive of 1918. In June the headquarters of 25th Division and its three infantry brigades returned to the United Kingdom with battalions reduced to training cadres, in order to organise a new fighting force. After 75th Bde was converted into 236th Bde, a new 75th Bde HQ was organised, and 25th Division returned to France to fight in the final battles of the Hundred Days Offensive.

236th Bde left 25th Division on 9 September 1918 at Mytchett Camp, Aldershot. It embarked at Dundee and Glasgow on 15 October for service in North Russia, and Bde HQ and the leading elements disembarked at Murmansk on 27 November.

== Order of battle ==
236th Bde was constituted as follows:

Commander: Brig-Gen M.N. Turner

- 17th (Service) Battalion (1st City), King's (Liverpool) Regiment (previously with 30th Division; reduced to training cadre 14 May 1918 and joined 75th Bde at Boulogne on 30 June for return to UK)
- 6th (Service) Battalion, Green Howards (previously with 11th (Northern) Division; reduced to training cadre 14 May 1918 and joined 75th Bde at Boulogne on 30 June for return to UK; absorbed newly formed 19th Battalion Green Howards during August)
- 13th (Service) Battalion, Green Howards (previously with 40th Division; reduced to training cadre 6 May 1918 and joined 75th Bde at Boulogne on 30 June for return to UK; absorbed newly formed 19th Battalion Green Howards during August)
- 11th (Service) Battalion (1st South Down), Royal Sussex Regiment (previously with 39th Division; reduced to training cadre 23 May 1918 and joined 75th Bde at Boulogne on 30 June for return to UK; absorbed newly formed 13th Battalion, Royal West Kent Regiment during July)
- 236th Trench Mortar Battery
- 236th Signal Section

It is reported that once in Russia the brigade was joined by 2/7th Battalion Durham Light Infantry, a Second-Line Territorial Force battalion which had converted to a Garrison Guard battalion in September and embarked separately for Arkhangelsk on 7 October.

In Russia, 75th Bde came under the orders of Maj-Gen Edmund Ironside in command of the Allied intervention force. The brigade remained in North Russia until 1919 (17th King's returned home in September 1919).

== External sources ==
- The Regimental Warpath 1914–1918
- The Long, Long Trail
