= Tufton Street =

Street in the City of Westminster

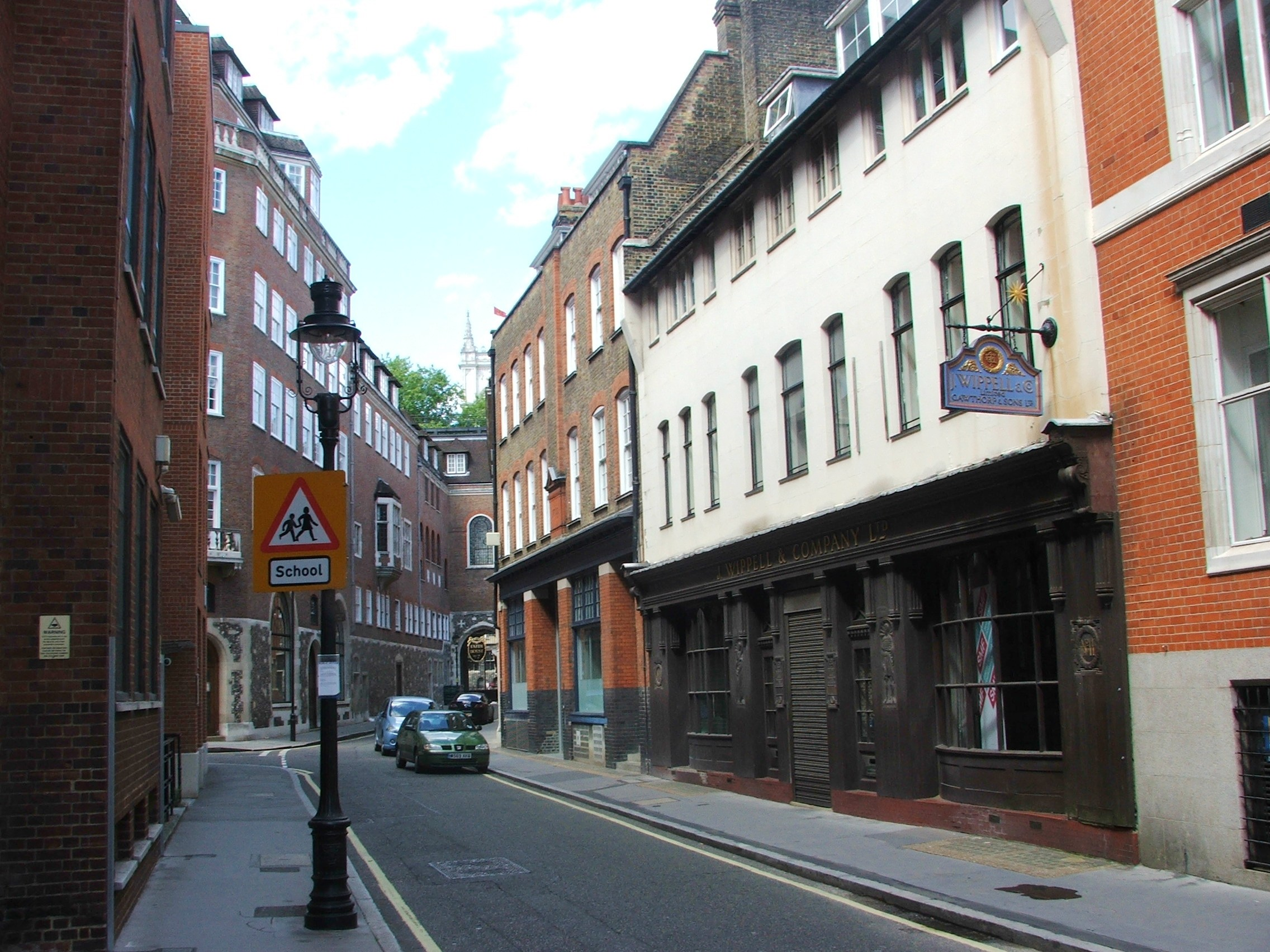
- View along Tufton Street towards Westminster Abbey

- Location within City of Westminster
- Former names: Bowling Alley (northern part, until 1870)
- Namesake: Richard Tufton
- Length: 340 m (1,120 ft)
- Location: London, England, UK
- Postal code: SW1
- Nearest metro station: St. James' Park
- Coordinates: 51°29′47″N 0°07′42″W
- North: Great College Street
- South: Horseferry Road

Other
- Known for: 55 Tufton Street; Church House, Westminster; Westminster School of Art; Tufton Street drill hall

Tufton Street is a road in Westminster, London, located just outside of the Westminster Abbey precinct. It was built by Sir Richard Tufton during the 17th century. Today it hosts a number of right-leaning lobby groups and think tanks. As a result, the street name is most often used as a metonym for these groups.

== History ==
Tufton Street, the northern part of which was known as Bowling Alley until 1870, was built by Sir Richard Tufton (1585–1631), an English lawyer and politician who sat in the House of Commons at various times between 1614 and 1629.

Composer Henry Purcell lived on or near the street (in addresses then known as St Anne's Lane from 1682 and Bowling Alley East from 1684 until 1692). Colonel Blood, best known for his attempt to steal the Crown Jewels from the Tower of London, lived in Tufton Street. One of London's notorious cock-fighting pits was located here until as late as 1815.

No 7 Tufton Street is Faith House, designed by Edwin Lutyens as the Church Institute for St John's, Smith Square and built in 1905–07. The building has been described as a version of an Italianate palazzo, reinterpreted in a Georgian style. It was taken over by the Society of the Faith in 1935. The vaulted, central room has occasionally been used as a concert space since the 1930s.

At No 11 is the church outfitters J. Wippell & Co., a business which dates back to 1834. The shop dates from 1929. Church House, the headquarters of the Church of England, occupies the south side of Dean's Yard and is bordered by Great Smith Street, Little Smith Street and the north end of Tufton Street.

The old Royal Architectural Museum and associated Westminster School of Art was located at No 18 from 1869 until 1904. The building was sold to the National Library for the Blind, but was demolished and consequently rebuilt in 1935. The Library remained in Tufton Street until 1978 before moving to Stockport.

No 24 Tufton Street is Mary Sumner House, the headquarters of the Mothers' Union, a worldwide Anglican women's organisation, named after its founder. The Grade II listed building, which opened in 1925, was designed by the Scottish architect Claude Ferrier. Next to it to the south is the back of a large red brick church (fronting onto Marsham Street) designed by Sir Herbert Baker and A. T. Scott in 1928 for Christian Scientists. In the 1990s it became the Emmanuel Centre (a conference centre) and the Emmanuel Evangelical Church. Also backing onto Tufton Street is Romney House (47 Marsham Street), built in the 1930s by the Austro-British architect Michael Rosenauer (1884–1971).

The Tufton Street drill hall is a former military installation, designed as the headquarters of the 23rd Middlesex Rifle Volunteer Corps and completed in 1899.

Eleanor Rathbone, independent member of parliament and pioneer of family allowance and women's rights, lived at Tufton Court (No 47) between 1940 and 1945.

The English war poet and novelist Siegfried Sassoon lived at No 54 from 1919 to 1925 (original house now demolished). The film maker Sir Michael Balcon lived at 57a Tufton Street between 1927 and 1939.

67 Tufton Street, originally a Post Office, was subsequently occupied by the Cabinet Office. It is now an apartment complex.

Today, the street is best known as a centre for Brexit-related eurosceptic and right-wing aligned think tanks. These groups are primarily based in 55 and 57 Tufton Street.

== See also ==
- K Street – Location of Washington's main think-tank and lobbying location
- Tufton Street drill hall
