= Tufton Street drill hall =

Former military installation in Westminster, London

- Westminster, London
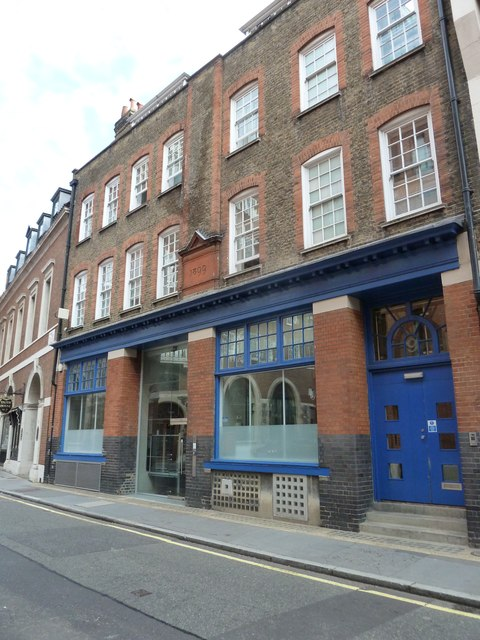
- Tufton Street drill hall

Site information
- Type: Drill Hall

Location
- Location within London
- Coordinates: 51.49745°N 0.12853°W

Site history
- Built: 1899
- Built for: War Office
- In use: 1899–1946

The Tufton Street drill hall is a former military installation on Tufton Street, Westminster, London.

== History ==
The drill hall was designed as the headquarters of the 23rd Middlesex Rifle Volunteer Corps and completed in 1899. That unit became the 2nd (City of London) Battalion, London Regiment (Royal Fusiliers) in 1908. The battalion was mobilised at the drill hall in August 1914 and was deployed on railway guarding duties before sailing for Malta and, ultimately, for the Western Front.

When the London Regiment was broken up and the battalions reallocated to other units in August 1937, the hall became the home of the 9th (2nd City of London) Battalion The Royal Fusiliers (City of London Regiment). In April 1946 the 9th (2nd City of London) Battalion was placed in suspended animation and the hall fell vacant. The building was converted for commercial use in the late 1980s and is now occupied by the Westminster School Music Centre.
