= Winifred Austin =

English library pioneer (1873–1918)

- Born: 7 October 1873; London
- Died: 17 May 1918 (aged 44); Fitzroy Square
- Occupations: Librarian and manager

Winifred Austin or Ethel Austin (7 October 1873 – 17 May 1918) was an English pioneer of library services for blind people at what was later called the National Library for the Blind from 1906 until her death.

== Life ==
Austin was born in London in 1873. Her father had been successful in business and was living off his investments. The writer Naomi Royde-Smith wrote a book, Love in Mildensee, in 1948, whose main character, Annette Willoughby, was based on Austin. Smith dedicated the book to her.

She had a well off family and did not appear to work until 1906 when she applied for a job at the Incorporated National Lending Library for the Blind.

Despite her lack of experience of qualifications she was appointed at £75 an year and started her job in May. The organisation had been founded and run by volunteers until the founder died in 1898. Under Austin's management the number of braille documents rose from 8,000 to 19,000 to 1914. More importantly the customer base had grown from 900 to 19,000.

Ethel Austin's earliest proposals of 1911 for the amalgamation of small libraries for the blind into one centralised system proved abortive. She gave talks at national conferences and from 1913 she wrote regularly for Librarian and Book World. By 1917, the Braille collections of the Home Teaching Society, the Girls Friendly Society and the Catholic Trust Society had been taken over. During the same year, the Library of the Manchester and Salford Blind Aid Society was presented to the National Library for the Blind and incorporated as its Northern Branch. It is noted that she spent a lot of time there where the librarian Louis Stanley Just worked. They wanted to marry but Austin's family objected because of the difference in circumstances.

Austin died in Fitzroy Square in 1918 from appendicitis which thwarted her plans to marry Louis Stanley Jast. Jast would later write one of his plays "The Lover and the Dead Woman" about her. Austin is acknowledged as a major cause of the success of the library for the blind. In 1918 it was reported that 100,000 documents were being circulated each year by the organisation that she had developed.
