= 2nd (City of London) Battalion, London Regiment (Royal Fusiliers) =

British volunteer military unit from 1861 to 1961

46th (London & Westminster) Middlesex RVC 2nd Volunteer Bn, Royal Fusiliers 2nd Bn, London Regiment 9th Bn, Royal Fusiliers 624 LAA Regiment, Royal Artillery
- Active: 16 April 1861–1 May 1961
- Country: United Kingdom
- Branch: Volunteer Force/Territorial Force/Territorial Army
- Type: Infantry Battalion; Anti-Aircraft Regiment
- Role: Infantry; Air Defence
- Size: 1–4 Battalions
- Part of: London Regiment; Royal Fusiliers; Royal Artillery
- Garrison/HQ: 9 Tufton Street, Westminster (1899–1937); 213 Balham High Road, Wandsworth (1937–1961)
- Nicknames: 'Second to Nondons' 'Two and Twopennies' (2/2nd Bn)
- Engagements: Second Boer War; World War I: Western Front; Gallipoli; World War II; Tunisia; Italy

Commanders
- Notable commanders: Sir John Shelley, 7th Baronet

The 2nd (City of London) Battalion, London Regiment (Royal Fusiliers) was a volunteer infantry battalion of the British Army under various titles from 1860 to 1961. It served in Malta, Gallipoli, Egypt and on the Western Front during World War I. In World War II it saw service in Iraq, North Africa and Italy. After a postwar spell as an air defence unit, it reverted to the infantry role, and merged into the Territorials of the Royal Fusiliers.

== Volunteer Force ==
The enthusiasm for the Volunteer movement following an invasion scare in 1859 saw the creation of many Rifle Volunteer Corps (RVCs) composed of part-time soldiers eager to supplement the Regular British Army in time of need. One such unit was the Royal National Rifles, proposed in August 1860 by Sir John Shelley, 7th Baronet, MP for Westminster, which was to be raised from 'Artisans and other respectable persons'. The prospectus suggested that uniforms would be paid for by a benevolent fund rather than the men themselves. However, there was a protracted controversy over its foundation: the Lord Lieutenant of Middlesex, the Marquis of Salisbury, was opposed to any unit that would 'place upon its class the stamp of inferiority to another' and refused to accept it even when Shelley proposed to change its concept from a purely artisan corps to include clerks from banks, printing houses and lawyers' offices. There were accusations of political prejudice and eventually the Secretary of State for War, Sidney Herbert, was forced to instruct Salisbury to accept the unit in March 1861.

The unit became the 46th (London and Westminster) Middlesex RVC with its first officers commissioned on 16 April. The delay in its formation explains its high number in the Middlesex RVC order of battle. Shelley became its first commanding officer (CO) and its headquarters (HQ) was at 5 Victoria Street, close to Westminster Abbey. By June 1861 the corps had eight companies, four raised in the City of London and four from the City and Liberty of Westminster and the district of Pimlico, and it moved into a larger HQ at 31 Great George Street. The recruits were reported to be from 'the respectable working class' and the officers were 'men of good social position'. The Second-in-Command (appointed 29 January 1862) was Major Lord Stratheden and Campbell, and the adjutant (appointed 26 September 1864) was Robert Beatty Henderson, who had served 19 years as a regular officer in the 21st Foot and the Ceylon Rifle Regiment.

After the initial enthusiasm the number of companies was reduced to six in 1864, reverting to eight in 1878. Lieutenant-colonel Shelley died in 1866 and was succeeded as acting CO by Major Lord Stratheden until Lt-Col F. Burlton Bennett, a former regular officer, was appointed on 19 February 1873. Bennett resigned on 11 November 1874, and Lord Stratheden was promoted to Lt-Col on 9 May 1875. When Lord Stratheden left to become Honorary Colonel of the Central London Rangers in 1876, Maj Robert Routledge, one of the unit's early officers, was promoted to succeed him. At one point seven of Routledge's sons were serving in the corps.The 46th Middlesex gained its own Honorary Colonel in 1877 when Lt-Col Sir Charles Russell, 3rd Baronet, VC, MP for Westminster and formerly of the Grenadier Guards, was appointed to the position. In 1876 the corps' HQ was at Great Smith Street.

When the Cardwell Reforms introduced 'Localisation of the Forces' in 1873, the 46th Middlesex was brigaded, together with several other London and Middlesex Volunteer and Militia battalions, in Brigade No 49 (Middlesex and Metropolitan) under the Royal Fusiliers (City of London Regiment). In 1880, following disbandments and amalgamations among less successful corps, the 46th Middlesex became the 23rd Middlesex RVC. In July 1883 as part of the Childers Reforms it became the 2nd Volunteer Battalion, Royal Fusiliers.

The Stanhope Memorandum of December 1888 proposed a comprehensive Mobilisation Scheme for Volunteer units, which would assemble in their own brigades at key points in case of war. In peacetime these brigades provided a structure for collective training. The battalion formed part of the West London Brigade, together with other VBs of the Royal Fusiliers and Middlesex Regiment, whose place of assembly was Caterham Barracks. In 1899 the battalion moved to a purpose-built HQ at 9 Tufton Street, next to Dean's Yard. An affiliated Cadet Corps was formed at St John's, Smith Square; at one point it was commanded by the Rev William Enderby Lutyens, the 2nd VB's Chaplain.

=== Second Boer War ===
After Black Week, the battalion was one of the first units to answer the call for volunteers to serve alongside the regulars in the Second Boer War. A composite Service Company drawn from the 1st, 2nd and 3rd VBs Royal Fusiliers and under the command of Maj W.S. Freidberger of the 2nd VB joined the 2nd Royal Fusiliers on 7 May 1900 at Fourteen Springs. G Company of the City of London Imperial Volunteers (CIV) was also formed from the three Royal Fusiliers VBs. The CIV returned to London when the war seemed over in the summer of 1900, but the service company continued with the regulars during the guerrilla phase of the war. This involved long marches, including the 'Great De Wet Hunt', and then tedious garrison duty in the blockhouse lines. A second composite company joined the 2nd Royal Fusiliers on 22 July 1901, and a third on 1 April 1902. Altogether, four officers and over 150 volunteers from the battalion served in the war, of whom nine were killed or died on active service. The battalion was awarded the Battle honour South Africa 1900–1902.

== Territorial Force ==
When the Volunteer Force was subsumed into the new Territorial Force (TF) under the Haldane Reforms of 1908, the Volunteer units in and around London were formed into a new London Regiment, with the 2nd VB of the Royal Fusiliers becoming the 2nd (City of London) Battalion, the London Regiment (Royal Fusiliers), conveniently shortened to '2nd Londons'. The 1st–4th Bns London Regiment (formerly the 1st–4th VBs Royal Fusiliers) remained brigaded together as 1st London Brigade of the 1st London Division of the TF.

Units of the TF were granted the privilege of carrying Colours if their strength was at least three-quarters of establishment. The 2nd Londons did not qualify, but the battalion began a vigorous recruitment campaign beyond its usual area of Westminster, Pimlico and North Lambeth, and established a new C Company in Willesden and Kilburn, with its HQ at Kingsgate Road, later at the Red Lion Hotel in Kilburn High Road. The unit therefore qualified alongside other battalions of the London Regiment for the presentation of colours at Windsor Castle on 19 June 1909.

== World War I ==
=== Mobilisation ===
The 1st London Division left by train from Waterloo Station on Sunday 2 August 1914 for its annual training camp, which was to be held at Wareham in Dorset. No sooner had the battalions reached camp than they received orders to return to London for mobilisation. This process had been carefully planned, and was completed on 3 August, so that before war was declared on 4 August the battalions of the 1st London Brigade were already at their war stations, guarding the vital London and South Western Railway line between Waterloo and Southampton. Under their commanding officer, Lt-Col Edwin Marler, the 2nd Londons were assigned to X Section, including Southampton Docks and the line from Eastleigh to Andover Junction to Amesbury. In the docks C Company boarded and seized the SS Hanna Larsen, a German-registered vessel moored suspiciously close to a vulnerable wooden railway bridge; the crew were interned for the duration of the war.

The TF was intended to be a home defence force and members could not be compelled to serve outside the country. However, on 10 August 1914 TF units were invited to volunteer for overseas service and the majority did so. On the night of 31 August/1 September the 1st London Bde was ordered back to its peacetime headquarters to mobilise for garrison duty overseas. At first the men of 2nd Londons were billeted in the Royal Horticultural Hall or camped in the adjacent Vincent Square, while recruits were drilled in Dean's Yard.The 1st London Brigade was the first Territorial formation to go overseas, sailing on 4 September aboard HM Transport Nevasa to relieve the Regular troops in garrison in Malta. A small number of officers and men ruled medically unfit or who had not volunteered for overseas service were left at Tufton Street to begin recruiting a reserve battalion. Shortly afterwards this was designated the 2/2nd Bn London Regiment, after which the parent unit became the 1/2nd Bn.

Recruitment was rapid, many volunteers coming from the 1st Royal Fusiliers Cadet Battalion and others from local department stores (Harrods, Army & Navy Stores, and half a company from Barkers of Kensington), and the 2/2nd was soon ready for overseas service, while a 3rd Line was formed as a reserve battalion to provide drafts for the 1/2nd and 2/2nd. Later a 4/2nd Battalion was also raised (see below).

=== 1/2nd Londons ===
The 1/2nd Bn disembarked in Malta on 14 September and began guard duties at Valletta as well as training the recruits in its ranks. While in Malta Lt-Col Marler was injured in an accident and Maj James Attenborough was promoted to succeed him in command. On 2 January 1915 the 1/2nd Bn was relieved by the 2/2nd Bn (leaving its obsolete rifles and equipment for the newcomers) and embarked for Marseille in France to join the British Expeditionary Force (BEF) on the Western Front. After disembarking on 6 January it was moved by train to Étaples where it had to make camp. After re-equipping with charger-loading Long Lee-Enfield rifles and 1914 pattern equipment and reorganising into the four-company establishment, 1/2nd Londons joined GHQ Reserve at Saint-Omer on 25 January for further training. It then joined 17th Brigade in 6th Division at Armentières on 21 February.

==== l'Epinette ====
6th Division was a Regular Army formation, and 1st Battalion, Royal Fusiliers, was serving in 17th Bde; it took in hand the TF battalion's introduction to Trench warfare. Afterwards pairs of companies took their turn in the front line alongside the rest of the brigade, and suffered their first casualties. On 10 March the BEF launched the Battle of Neuve Chapelle, and 17th Bde was ordered to carry out a diversion by capturing the hamlet of l'Epinette in the German front line opposite. 1/2nd Londons was detailed to support the two attacking battalions, moving up behind them and providing carrying parties. The surprise attack was made on the night of 11/12 March and was successful; the brigade then had to consolidate its gains before the Germans could counter-attack, with 1/2nd Londons digging and wiring the new line. The Germans now brought down a heavy bombardment and launched three separate attacks, which were all driven off by artillery and rifle fire. The shelling was kept up next day, and A Company of 1/2nd Londons reinforced 1st Bn North Staffordshire Regiment, assisting in evacuating their casualties. When B Company went up to relieve A Company the next night it was caught by shellfire, suffering numerous casualties. The brigade carried out further diversionary attacks on 24 April during the Second Battle of Ypres and on 8–9 May during the Battle of Aubers Ridge. 6th Division was relieved from the Armentières sector on 3 June and marched to Poperinge in the Ypres Salient.

==== Hooge ====
On arrival in the Salient 17th Bde bivouacked in the woods, there being no habitable buildings or any tents, and the area was under constant shellfire. When 1/2nd Londons took its place in brigade reserve along the Yser Canal it occupied dugouts that were simply scrapes in the canal bank and it spent 21 consecutive nights in June on working parties to repair the front line trenches. During a second tour of duty in July, 17th Bde had to contend with enemy snipers and trench raids. The strength of the 1/2nd Londons fell, both because of casualties and because many of its skilled Territorials were seconded to other roles. The battalion went back into brigade reserve, but when the brigade as relieved in mid-July 1/2nd Londons remained, providing nightly working parties; it was not sent for rest until 3 August. At the end of July the Germans had captured the British positions on the Menin Road at Hooge. 6th Division carried out a carefully prepared operation to retake the positions on 9 August. 16th and 18th Brigades made a concentric attack at daybreak, after which 17th Bde moved up to consolidate the new line. This took 12 days, during which 1/2nd Londons was frequently shelled and its working parties often engaged in skirmishes with the enemy.

In September the battalion moved into the dilapidated La Brique trenches, and with the help of a reinforcement draft were able to improve them, and carried out a diversion with smoke and rifle fire to assist an attack elsewhere. In order to even up experience levels between Regular and New Army (or 'Kitchener's Army') formations, 17th Bde transferred to 24th Division on 14 October. 1/2nd Londons did a short tour of duty at Hill 62, then in was moved to 'The Bluff', a key position by the Ypres–Comines Canal where the trench conditions were especially bad. It held this position from 26 October to 21 November without relief, suffering a steady trickle of casualties. 17th Brigade was then relieved for rest and training, and providing working parties.

==== Gommecourt ====
'St Paul's Sword', the formation sign of 56th (1st London) Division in World War I

On 9 February 1916 the battalion returned to the 1st London Division, which was being reformed in the Hallencourt area as the 56th (1st London) Division. The battalion was now assigned to the 169th (3rd London) Brigade, along with the 1/5th (London Rifle Brigade) (LRB), 1/9th (Queen Victoria's Rifles) (QVR) and 1/16th (Westminsters) Londons (QWR). On 5 May the battalion absorbed a large draft from the 2/2nd Bn (see below), followed by others as that battalion was dispersed.

After the reformed division had shaken down, 169th Bde moved south on 7 May and went into a hutted camp at Halloy to train for its part in the forthcoming 'Bug Push' (the Battle of the Somme). On 19 May the 1/2nd moved to Souastre and later to Hébuterne to take part in labouring to prepare for the offensive, including laying a siding for heavy railway guns. From 3 June two companies at a time moved out of Hébuterne into the 'Y' trenches opposite the Gommecourt Salient, where the division was due to attack. The Gommecourt sector was static, but the Y trenches were under fire from enemy Minenwerfers and the unit suffered frequent casualties until it was relieved between 11 and 13 June. It then returned to Souastre and resumed nightly digging to bury telephone cables. The bombardment preceding the attack began on 24 June (U Day) and was expected to continue over the following days (V, W, X and Y) until Z Day when the assault would go in. During this period 169th Bde was moved out of the line to practise the assault they were to make on Z Day (which was delayed by weather to 1 July). Meanwhile 167th (1st London) Brigade held the line, but by 29 June the 1/7th Middlesex Regiment was so exhausted from serving in the wet trenches that it had to be relieved, and 1/2nd Londons was sent into the front trenches until 30 June when it went to its assembly trenches for the next day's attack.

Having done extra labouring and trench duty, 1/2nd Londons were assigned to brigade reserve for the attack. However, they were heavily shelled in their assembly trenches even before the attack began at 07.25. 169th Brigade's leading battalions, the LRB and QVR, reached the enemy front trench and most of their first objectives, though the QVR was delayed by uncut wire, and the QWR in support caught up and became mixed with them. All three battalions quickly came under heavy counter-attack by German parties working their way down the communication trenches. Meanwhile, the heavy German barrage made No man's land impassable to carrying parties and reinforcements. Only a 20-man party of the 1/2nd Londons carrying mortar ammunition had got across with the third wave. By 12.30 the situation for the leading battalions was becoming desperate, and they were running out of bombs. Four volunteers from 1/2nd Londons tried to get across with orders to move up the communication trenches to 'The Quadrilateral', which seemed to be unoccupied by either side. The survivor came back to report that it was impossible to advance without bombs. Between 13.30 and 13.45 the brigadier ordered 1/2nd Londons to attempt to cross, carrying as many bombs as they could. Lieutenant-Col Attenborough gave out his orders, and C Company set out, followed by A Company.

As the Official History records: 'a very gallant attempt of two companies of the 1/2nd Londons' (to cross No man's land) 'about 2.P.M. merely led to their being mown down by machine-gun fire from the park and by heavy artillery fire from Puisieux'. The Lord Mayor of London, Sir Charles Wakefield, later compared the action of the two companies to the Charge of the Light Brigade. The brigadier and Lt-Col Attenborough stooped the other two companies from following. There were now so many wounded lying in No man's land that men of the remaining companies went out to try to bring some of them in. This was allowed by a German medical officer who went out with a white flag and said that there was no objection to the removal of wounded from the British side of the wire, so long as no firing took place. Unfortunately this truce was interrupted by British artillery fire on the German front trench. The survivors of 169th Bde in the lines withdrew at 20.00, and the survivors of A and C Companies (barely 50 men, mostly wounded) made their way back after dark. The battalion's casualties amounted to 4 officers and 41 other ranks (ORs) killed, 6 officers and 158 ORs wounded, and 2 officers and 42 ORs missing, some of whom were later confirmed to be dead. About 45 wounded were brought in on the morning of 2 July during another informal truce. 1/2nd Londons were relieved on 3 July.

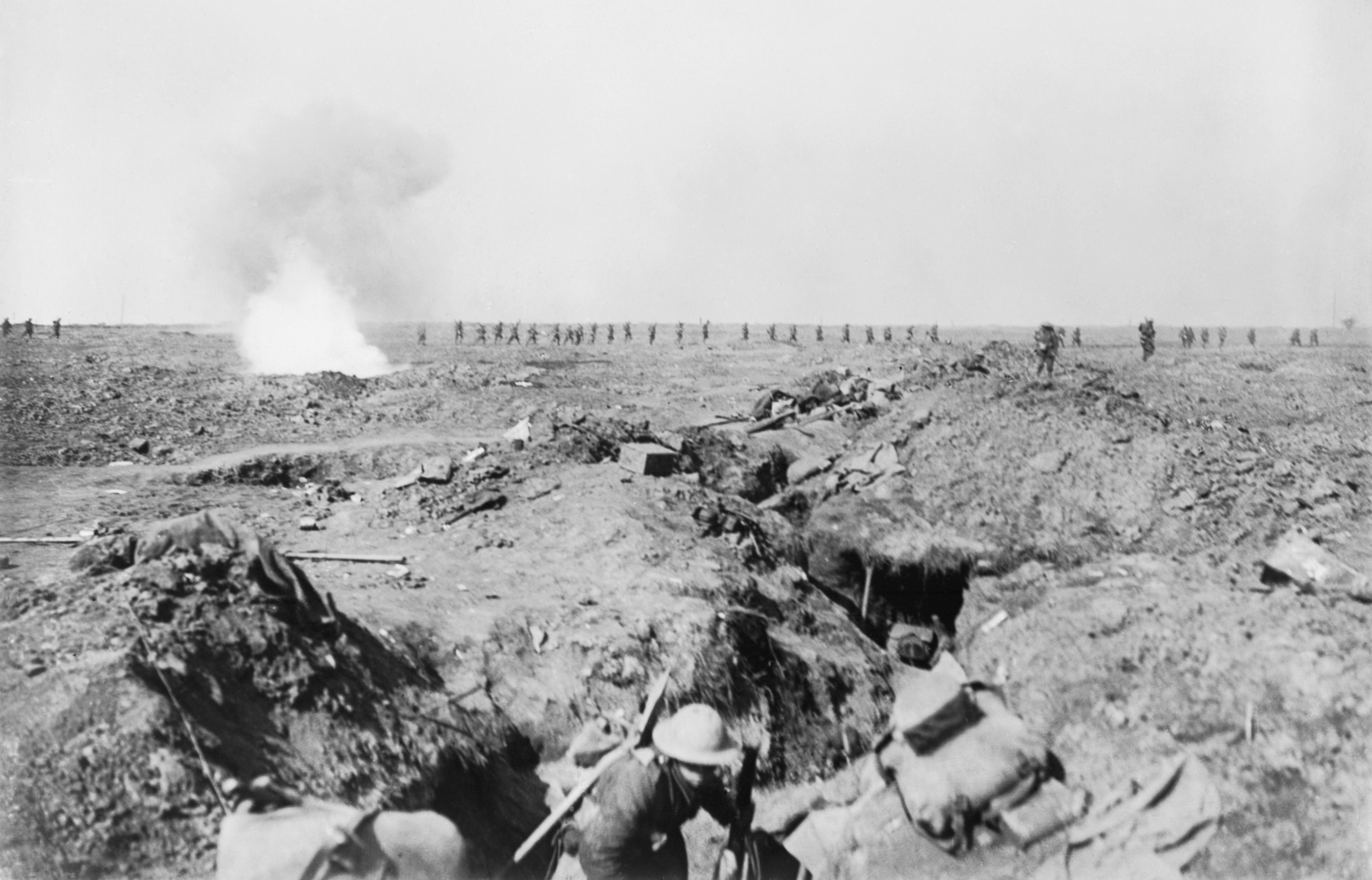
British troops advancing during the Battle of Ginchy

==== Somme ====
The Gommecourt attack had been a diversion and no further attack was made in the area. The reduced battalions of 56th Division had to hold their line until 20 August. 1/2nd Londons was joined by a large draft of reinforcements from the 21st (1st Surrey Rifles) and 22nd (Queen's) Bns of the Londons.After being relieved, the 56th Division moved to the southern Somme sector and underwent training to re-enter the Somme Offensive.

On 5 September 1916 the 56th Division went back into the line during the Battle of Ginchy. For the attack of 9 September 169th Bde had the responsibility of establishing a defensive flank along the slopes of the Combles ravine. At 16.45 the LRB advanced against Loop trench, but was obliged to retire back into Leuze Wod ('Lousy Wood') by artillery and machine gun fire. It was reinforced by part of 1/2nd Londons for a renewed attempt, and then the QWR was sent in as well. The troops dug in and waited until next morning before trying again at 07.00. The QWR attacked out of Leuze Wood in a heavy mist, but the artillery barrage was feeble and the machine guns in Loop trench were unaffected. 1/2nd Londons sent A Company to help a new bombing attack at 15.00 supported by the brigade's own trench mortars, but this too was driven back by shellfire. B Company had to man Q trench south of the wood to hold off a German counter-attack, losing all but one of its officers to a shell burst. The brigade was relieved that night, 1/2nd Londons having lost 4 officers and 23 ORs killed, 4 officers and 91 ORs wounded, and 19 missing.

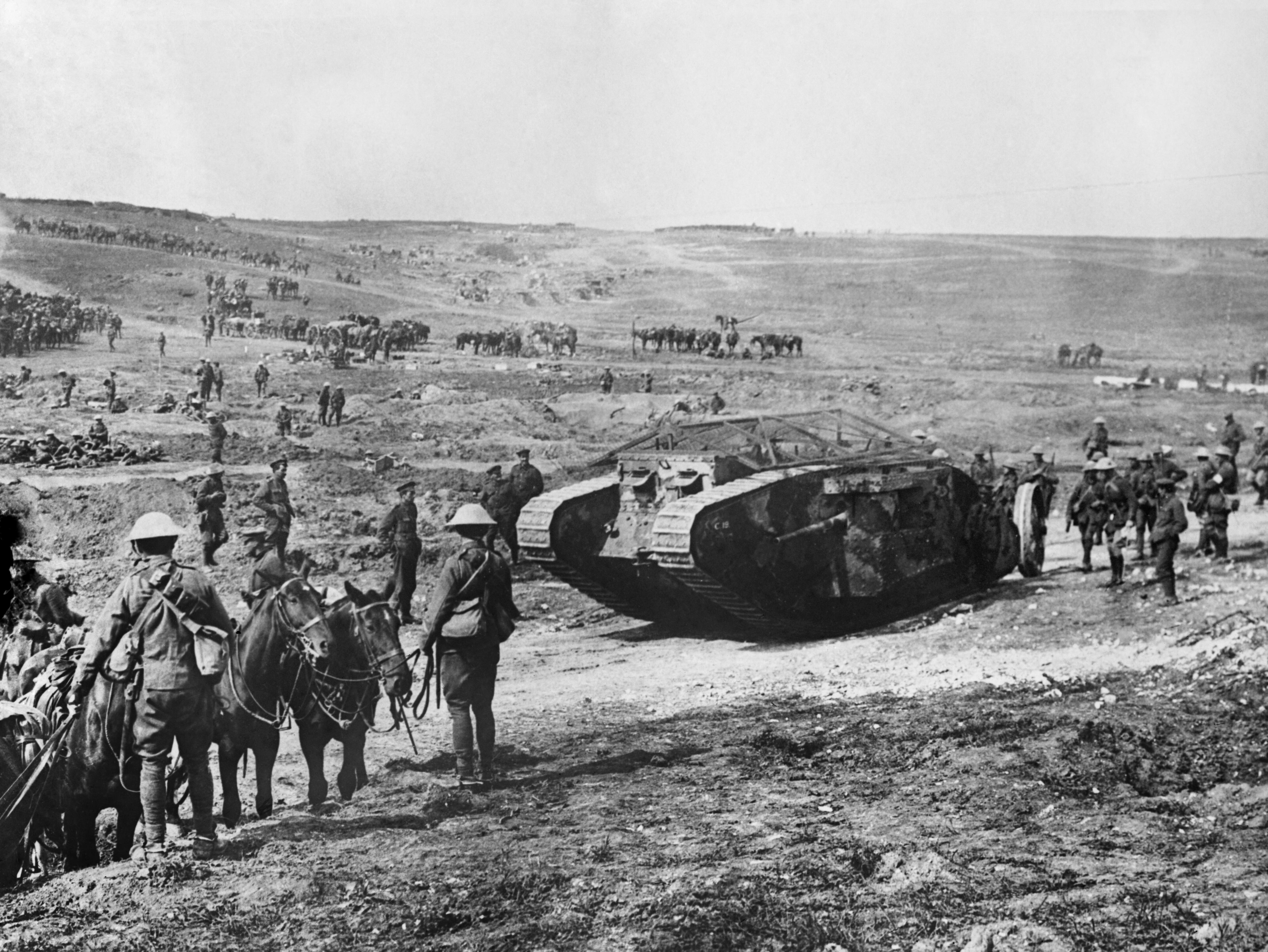
A tank of C Company moving up on 15 September 1916

For the next phase of the offensive, the Battle of Flers–Courcelette beginning on 15 September, 169th Bde once again had the task of forming the defensive flank in the Combles ravine, but this time it would have one of the new tanks in support. During the night of 14/15 September 1/2nd Londons dug assembly trenches south of Leuze Wood and tank C16 (' Creme de Menthe ') of C Company, Heavy Section, Machine Gun Corps, was ready at the corner of the wood before dawn. It began its advance just before 06.00, and at 06.20 the leading waves of 169th Bde including D Company of 1/2nd Londons advanced when the creeping barrage came down. With the help of the tank D and then C Companies of 1/2nd Londons entered Combles trench and began moving down that trench and up Loop trench; fighting went on all day, eventually drawing in the whole of the battalion and the bombers of the LRB. By the end of the day the battalion had established blocks in the trenches and the brigade was not far short of its objectives. The battalion consolidated its position, though it was now very weak having lost 4 officers and 10 ORs killed, 3 officers and 19 ORs, wounded, and 251 ORs missing.

The division made a second attempt on its other objectives on 18 September, but the battalion (now only 7 officers and 481 ORs, even after receiving a draft of 50 men) did not take part, only relieving the QWR in the Combles and Q trenches after the action. It stayed there until 24 September, digging new advanced trenches, harassed by enemy shellfire, including gas shells. When the division attacked again with tanks on 25 September (the Battle of Morval), German resistance began to crumble and at 08.00 on 26 September a patrol from 1/2nd Londons found that they had evacuated Combles. Major Gerald Stacey, temporarily in command, sent the combined A and C Companies into the village with the LRB and the neighbouring French to complete the Capture of Combles. The two companies took a number of wounded prisoners and pushed on about 1,500 yards (1,400 m) beyond the village to establish a line along the railway. It was only a series of rifle pits and was under shellfire, but it connected up the French and the rest of 56th Division. The battalion's casualties in the final stages of the operations against Combles had cost 7 ORs killed and 51 wounded.

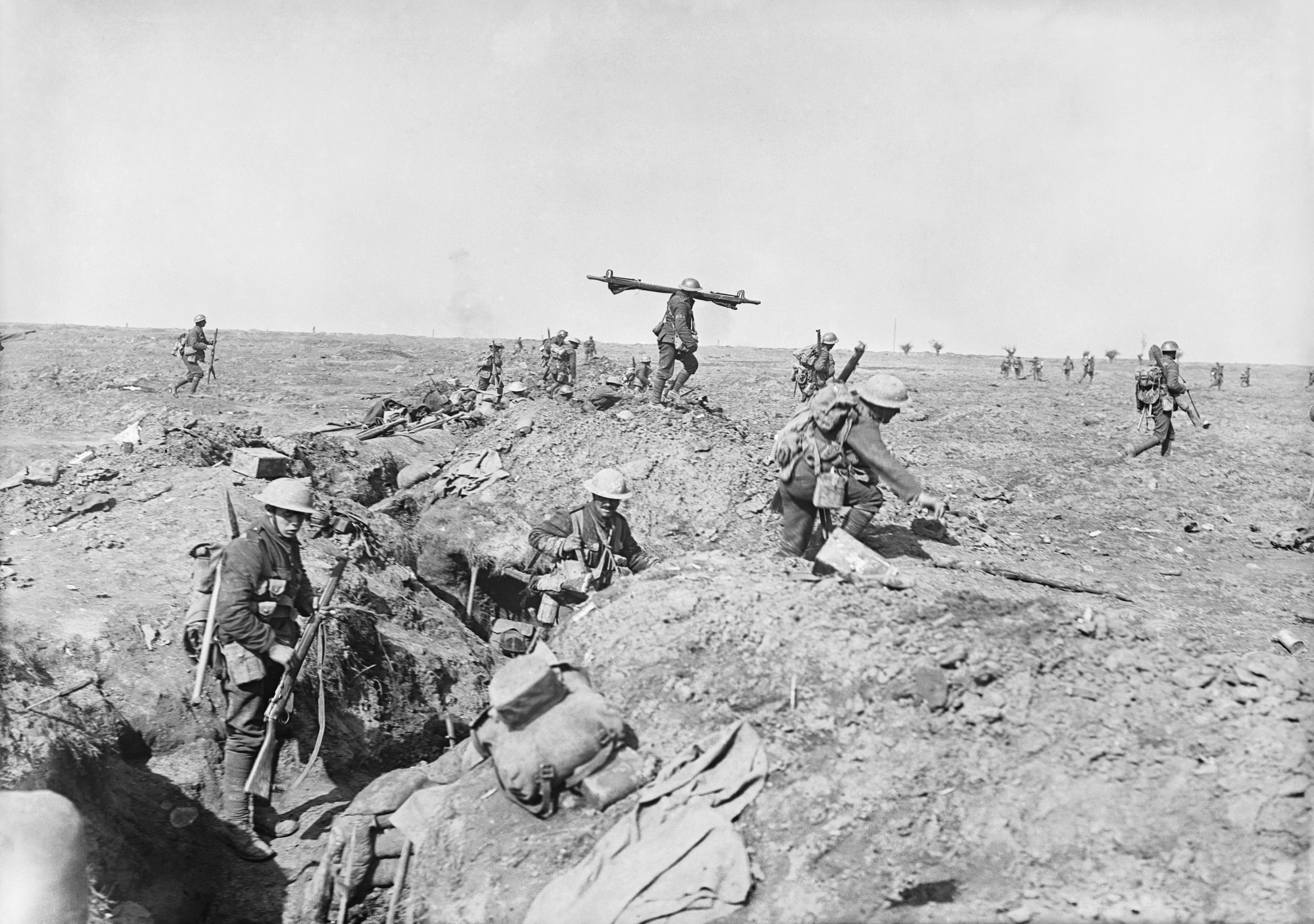
British troops at Morval 25 September 1916

The battalion was taken out of the line for rest at Méaulte but after only two days it was sent back up to participate in the Battle of the Transloy Ridges. First it dug new communication trenches, then it relieved 1/1st Londons in the front line at Lesbœufs, a difficult task with the foremost trenches cut off in a sea of mud and only accessible at night. The positions were under frequent shellfire. It had to be relieved after only two days and pulled out to Bernafay Wood. With a fighting strength of only 14 officers and 354 ORs it was not called upon for the attack on 7 October, but supplied working parties, and then took over the line the following day. On 9 October the division was relieved, but Maj Stacey was killed by shellfire as 1/2nd Londons pulled out. The battalion's casualties since it re-entered the Somme fighting in September had been 9 officers killed and 8 wounded, 47 other ranks killed, 291 wounded, and 273 missing.

There followed months of light training and line-holding in the Neuve Chapelle sector while the units of 56th Division were slowly rebuilt. By the beginning of 1917 1/2nd Londaons attained a strength of 41 officers and 1012 ORs. The battalion was engaged in active patrolling and capturing prisoners for identification of enemy units, which were only holding their lines thinly. However, enemy shelling was frequent and accurate.

==== Arras ====
In the first week in March 56th Division marched to the Arras sector to take part in the forthcoming Arras Offensive. At dawn on 17 March a patrol of 1/2nd Londons, lying out close to the enemy line, found it unmanned. The company commander immediately occupied their line. It was the beginning of the German retreat to the Hindenburg Line (Operation Alberich). Soon the whole division was moving forward and 1/2nd Londons had occupied Beaurains. 169th Brigade was ordered to keep touch with the enemy and next day found them holding strong lines at Neuville-Vitasse and Telegraph Hill. The retreat here was minor compared with other sectors, and so the planned British attack (the First Battle of the Scarpe) went in on 9 April, only one day late. Leaving 169th Bde in reserve, 56th Division captured Neuville-Vitasse on the first day, and most of the Cojeul Switch trench (part of the main Hindenburg Line defences) the day after. Late on 11 April, 169th Bde relieved 167th Bde to continue the attack next day. This was launched at 05.15 with 1/2nd Londons of the right and the LRB on the left to envelop Hill 90. B Company of 1/2nd Londons bombed its way of Cojeul Switch behind the hill and joined hands with the LRB. A Company then pushed on and captured Héninel, after which the rest of the battalion occupied Wancourt Tower Ridge by 08.00 and made contact with the division on the right. There was now no organised defensive line between the brigade and its next objective, Chérisy, about 2 miles (3.2 km) away, and for the next day it was ordered to be ready to attack as soon as the divisions on either flank were up. However, both flanking divisions failed in their attacks, and 169th Bde's advance was postponed. On 14 April it attacked towards Wancourt Tower but the attack failed because of confusion with the neighbouring division; 1/2nd Londons was not engaged and at the end of the day moved back to Neuville-Vitasse, its casualties over the whole operation having been light (1 officer and 45 ORs).

During a period out of the line, in reserve and training, Lt-Col Attenborough left the battalion due to ill-health and Maj J.P. Kellett (who had joined the regiment in August 1914) was promoted to succeed him.

56th Division moved back for the Third Battle of the Scarpe. On 29 April 169th Bde took over the line from the Cojeul River to the Arras–Cambrai road, with 1/2nd Londons initially in reserve. On the night of 1/2 May the battalion moved into the front line for the attack, with a fighting strength of 17 officers and 577 ORs. The assault was launched at 03:45 on 3 May, with 1/2nd Londons advancing in four waves. The first wave made good progress, bypassing Cavalry Farm and reaching its objective, Lanyard trench, but 167th Bde on its left got held up, and troops of 1/1st Londons falling back got mixed up with the second wave of 1/2nd Londons. The second wave therefore had trouble 'mopping up' Cavalry Farm and the third and waves became mixed up with it, only a small parties pressing on to Lanyard trench and beyond. These formed a defensive flank where 167th Bde should have been, and began digging in. Major Kellett was given a company of the reserve battalion (QVR) and a section of the brigade trench mortar battery, and instructed to clear Cavalry Farm and if possible Tool trench, from which machine gun fire was holding up the whole advance. However, the Germans still held part of Tool trench at 16.00 and the situation of the leading troops in Lanyard trench was becoming precarious. Although they were relieved by the LRB after dark, both battalions were ordered at midnight to withdraw to the starting line. The battalion's casualties amounted to 3 officers and 16 ORs killed, 2 officers and 114 ORs wounded, and 2 officers and 55 ORs missing. One sergeant was captured in Tool trench, but returned next day with his captors (1 officer and 12 ORs) who had surrendered to him. 169th Brigade spent the next two weeks in divisional reserve while 56th Division continued attacking.

==== Ypres ====
Apart from a short spell back in the Cojeul trenches (9–20 June), when C and D Companies opened heavy fire on a series of German-held shellholes being attacked by 3rd Division, the battalion was out of the line until the end of July. Reinforcements in this period included a large group of officers from the 7th Londons. On 4 August 56th Division began moving to the Ypres Salient to take part in the second phase of the Third Ypres Offensive (the Battle of Langemarck, 16 August). 169th Brigade carried out a preliminary operation to improve the start line around Glencorse Wood but was driven off. The offensive was already bogging down in mud: 1/2nd Londons could only reach their jumping off line by skirting round the rims of water-filled shellholes. For the main attack 169th Bde was in the centre with 1/2nd and the LRB leading. At first all went well, as they disposed of isolated German parties with machine guns in the shellholes, but then 1/2nd Londons ran into a marsh and had to edge to the right, pushing the LRB further right. Meanwhile, the same marsh was causing 167th Bde to edge to the left, opening a gap between the two. Beyond the marsh the battalion came upon the main German defence line in concrete pillboxes along a sunken road crossing Glencorse Wood. The leading waves of A and B Companies cleared Glencorse Wood and pushed on towards Polygon Wood, but what happened to them is unknown, the second waves having been thrown back to Glencorse Wood. A heavier counter-attack later in the day pushed the whole brigade back to its start line. After this failure the division was withdrawn the following night. The casualties had been very heavy, 1/2nd Londons losing 4 officers and 32 ORs killed, 5 officers including Lt-Col Kellett and 121 ORs wounded, 5 officers and 162 ORs missing.

==== Cambrai ====
The casualties from the Ypres fighting were not replaced, and the whole division was numerically weak, so it was sent to a quiet sector at Louverval, where 1/2nd Londons and the LRB alternated in the line for the next three months. 56th Division was given the task of making a demonstration with dummy tanks and figures on the flank of the great tank attack that opened the Battle of Cambrai on 20 November. The demonstration succeeded in attracting German defensive fire. On 22 November the flank battalions of 169th Bde became involved in the fighting round Tadpole Copse and next day 1/2nd Londons and 1/14th (London Scottish) were ordered to get into the Hindenburg Support Line trenches to isolate the German garrison of Mœuvres. The men had to be called back from working parties and hurriedly assembled, and Zero hour had to be delayed. Each company was to work its way down a communication trench towards the support line, but these trenches had been filled with barbed wire and strong bombing blocks. The battalion struggled with these for six hours before it was conceded that either artillery or tank support was necessary. Lieutenant-Col Sneath had to send the reserve platoon of 1/2nd Londons to help the London Scottish stop a German counter-attack.

On 30 November the Germans began a counter-offensive that slowly recaptured the ground. At 07.30 the forward companies of the 1/2nd Londons reported that large parties of the enemy could be seen assembling north of Mœuvres and around Quarry Wood; the battalion stood to arms. The attack began further south at 08.00 and only developed on the front of 56th Division two hours later, preceded by a tremendous barrage. At 10.45 the SOS rockets calling for artillery support went up all along the line as the German infantry attacked behind a heavy trench mortar barrage. Despite their casualties, C and D companies were able to hold this up, but the Germans were also coming down the communication trenches on both flanks and eventually attacked the two companies from their support trench in the rear. However, A Company together with all available men from Battalion HQ and plenty of bombs was able to retake the support line and regain touch with the brigade to the left. Meanwhile, Battalion HQ formed a strongpoint and rallying point in the rear; it was heavily shelled, the fire controlled by five German aircraft, one of which was brought down by Lewis gun fire. Fighting continued for several hours, but by 18.30, reinforced by a company of the QVR, the enemy had been driven off. The battalion had lost one officer and 16 ORs killed, three officers and 116 ORs wounded, and one officer and 52 ORs missing. That night the 1/3rd Londons relieved the battered 1/2nd Londons, and the fighting continued the next day until the German advance was held. The division was relieved and sent to a quieter sector on 3 December. At the end of the battle the 1/2nd Londons with 561 all ranks was the weakest battalion in the battered division.

56th Division spent the winter in the Gavrelle sector, north-east of Arras. By early 1918 the BEF was suffering a manpower crisis and disbanded one battalion in four to provide reinforcements for the remainder: 1/2nd Londons received a draft off 11 officers and 250 ORs when 1/3rd Londons was disbanded. Anticipating a German offensive the BEF worked on its defences.

==== Spring Offensive ====
The German Spring Offensive opened on 21 March 1918, further south from 56th Division's positions, but on 28 March the Germans extended their attacks to the Arras sector (Operation Mars, or the Third Battle of Arras). The previous night 56th Division had just been redeployed, and 1/2nd Londons had taken up defences in the 'Red Line', behind the first line and outposts held by the LRB and QWR. The bombardment began with gas shelling at 03.00, followed by high explosive. The men of 1/2nd Londons 'stood to' in their respirators to await the attack. The SOS signals went up from the outposts at 07.00 as the German infantry advanced behind a creeping barrage and enveloped the outposts, most of which had been obliterated by the bombardment. Eventually casualties among the LRB and QWR were so high that they were ordered to fall back to the Red Line. Lieutenant-Col Kellett watched the attack unfolding from Battalion HQ in Ditch Post, which had a buried telephone cable back to Brigade HQ (one of the few lines not cut by shellfire). After their initial successes, the German attack on the Red Line was uncoordinated, developing between 08.45 and 10.15. Despite being fired on by German aircraft, 1/2nd Londons held off three attacks on its company positions. By 14.00 some German troops were seen to be withdrawing, and a second bombardment began. At about 16.45 Kellett was able to call down defensive artillery fire on a group of four enemy field guns that had been brought up into close action. However, although the bombardment continued until 18.00, no new attack materialised: Operation Mars had completely failed. 169th Brigade was relieved early next day and went into billets. 1/2nd Londons' casualties amounted to 1 officer and 23 ORs killed, 2 officers and 69 ORs wounded, and 15 ORs missing.

While the Germans continued their offensive in other sectors, 56th Division spent the following weeks in reserve, often at 5 minutes' notice to go into action, or preparing defences round Arras. Some training was carried out, and 1/2nd Londons was reinforced to a strength of 41 officers and 931 ORs during April. By the end of the month the 56th Division was holding the line once more, and carrying out aggressive patrolling trench raids.

==== Hundred Days Offensive ====
The Allies launched their counter-blow (the Hundred Days Offensive) at the Battle of Amiens on 8 August. 56th Division was sent south and joined in the offensive at the Battle of Albert on 23 August. Earlier, 169th Bde had been sent on ahead to prepare for an attack that was cancelled, and had a difficult march to reposition, so it remained in reserve during the attacks by the other brigades from 23 to 26 August. On the evening of 26 August 169th Bde relieved 167th Bde in the line, with 1/2nd Londons on the left, with orders to press the attack next morning round the north of Croisilles up to the Hindenburg Line (the Battle of the Scarpe). The attack was to be launched from Summit trench, which the division had captured earlier, and several platoons of 1/2nd Londons made a stealth attack that night to take Fooley trench in preparation; this failed, but they established outposts ahead of Summit trench. The main attack was launched at 09.36 on 27 August behind a weak creeping barrage. Although Fooley trench was quickly cleared, the advance was enfiladed by fire from Croisilles. Seeing this, Lt-Col Kellett gathered all the available men, chiefly from HQ, together with some machine guns, and improvised a flank guard to allow the advance to continue to Farmer's trench. At about midday the battalion intelligence officer, reconnoitring ahead, reported to Kellett that Sensée alley was unoccupied by the enemy and would provide a covered way up to the Hindenburg Line. Leaving B Company at the junction of Farmer's trench and Sensée alley to provide a flank guard towards Croisilles, the rest of the battalion moved up under cover and made good its objectives in the Hindenburg Line. Its casualties in the day were over 200. Next day the battalion supported 169th Bde's advance that swung along the Hindenburg Line towards Bullecourt. Carrying out this difficult manoeuvre the battalions got mixed up with each other and with the neighbouring division, but C and D Companies of 1/2nd Londons followed the barrage and worked their way down Tunnel trench (see below). A and B Companies attacked in support of the QWR. the battalion only had 7 officers and 95 ORs available for the next day's attack, so it was assigned to 'mop up' behind the rest of the brigade. The advance was carried out under intense machine gun fire form in front and both flanks, but reached the outskirts of Bullecourt, Lt-Col Kellett being wounded. 1/2nd Londons' other casualties during the operations were 2 officers and 39 ORs killed, 13 officers and 220 ORs wounded. The other brigades completed the capture of Bullecourt before the division was relieved on 31 August.

56th Division returned to the line between 6 and 9 September, and by 25 September was on the Arras–Cambrai road preparing for the major series of Allied attacks beginning next day. The division was given a role on the Battle of the Canal du Nord launched on 27 September: after the Canadian Corps had forced a crossing of the canal, 56th Division was to work its way north up both canal banks. 169th Brigade was to cross to the east bank, relieve the Canadians on the Blue Line, and then advance with 1/2nd Londons on its right working up the east bank of the parallel Agache river. The battalion's immediate objective was the village of Sauchy-Lestrée and the east end of Sauchy-Cauchy including Cemetery Wood. The Canadians were held up at the village of Marquion and then 56th Division's Royal Engineers (REs) and pioneer battalions had to fight to clear the enemy from the far bank before they could lay their assault bridges. 1/2nd Londons only crossed at midday, and D Company had to fight their way onto their start line. 169th Bde's attack was consequently delayed by 40 minutes, but the orders only arrived at battalion HQ 14 minutes before Zero, and a runner could not reach A Company before it began its advance. Luckily the company was halted and reformed on the Blue Line before the new barrage came down. However, the attack went well, and 1/2nd Londons took Sauchy-Lestrée, Sauchy-Cauchy and Cemetery Wood without difficulty. However, it took five attacks in conjunction with the LRB to take a pesietsent machine gun nest on the railway embankment south-west of Oisy. The Sensée marshes beyond were covered by machine guns and no further progress could be made. However, next day 169th Bde advanced across the marshes behind a creeping barrage without meeting much opposition. The battalion's casualties had been light (6 ORs killed, 4 officers and 61 ORs wounded) and it had taken many prisoners. Lieutenant-Col Kellett was awarded a Bar to his Distinguished Service Order (DSO).

The 1/2nd Londons carried out active patrolling over the next few days, with some clashes with the enemy, but it was not engaged in the Battle of Cambrai (8–9 October) with the rest of the division. However, on the night of 12/13 October 169th Bde attempted to cross the Sensée Canal and capture Aubigny-au-Bac. First, 416th (Edinburgh) Field Company, RE, laid a footbridge and a patrol of the QWR went over. Then a platoon of D Company, 1/2nd Londons, crossed silently and overpowered the sentries without the alarm being raised. By 04.50 the whole company was across and was able to improvise a bridge over the next stream. The attack went in at 05.15, covered by a barrage, D Company attacking the village from the flank, the leading platoon clearing the houses on the Aubigny–Féchain road, the remainder entering the village along the Auberchicourt road. The company was then reinforced by two platoons from C Company and by four light trench mortars, while A Company closed up to the canal in support, taking cover in a railway cutting from enemy shelling. However, enemy fire made it difficult to expand the bridgehead, and the garrison of the villages was counter-attacked by a full enemy battalion about 10.30. One by one 1/2nd Londons' posts were eliminated and eventually a withdrawal was ordered. The survivors made a stand on the far bank, covered by artillery, and even attempted to recapture Aubigny, before crossing back to rejoin the battalion. A Company continued to hold a mall bridgehead until 17.00, when it was ordered to withdraw by 169th Bde. At dawn next day B Company sent a patrol across, but the bridge broke, and the patrol was only recovered after Corporal James McPhie of 416th Field Company repaired the bridge. He was mortally wounded and was awarded a posthumous Victoria Cross for this action. Although the operation failed at a cost of 8 ORs killed, 1 officer and 51 ORs wounded, 1 wounded officer and 56 ORs missing, 1/2nd Londons received high praise for the effort.

When 56th Division returned to the front on 2/3 November after a spell of rest and reorganisation, it was to conditions of open fighting rather than trench warfare. On the morning of 3 November a sentry of 1/2nd Lonsons patrols reported that the enemy were retiring, and the QWR advanced and liberated Saultain at 11.00. 1/2nd Londons then took over the lead and followed up to the line of the Aunelle river, which was strongly held, The division continue to press the enemy rearguards over the next two day during the Battle of the Sambre, up to the line of the Grande Honnelle which the Germans were holding in strength. 56th (London) Division attempted an assault crossing at 05.30 on 6 November. Just before Zero the enemy put down a heavy barrage of gas shells, but 1/2nd Londons and the LRB advanced in gas masks and crossed the river. The 1/2nd then attacked the Bois de Beaufort ahead, but a large force of Germans counter-attacked out of the wood, driving back the LRB. A and B Companies of the 1/2nd remained in front of the wood until late in the afternoon, driving back a party of Germans who had demanded their surrender. But finding themselves almost surrounded they fell back across the river. That was the battalion's last action. During the night of 6/7 November the Germans made a general withdrawal, and next morning the 56th Division swept across the Grande Honnelle and began a pursuit that ended at Harveng on 10 November, when the division was withdrawn. Hostilities ended next day when the Armistice with Germany came into force.

At the Armistice the 1/2nd Londons was at Athis. It took part in the official entry into Mons on 15 November. The division remained in the area of Harveng carrying out road repairs. Demobilisation of 'pivotal' workers got under way and by the end of January 1919 unit strengths had dropped considerably. They were progressively reduced to cadre strength; the cadres of 56th (London) Division then returned to the UK, 1/2nd Londons sailing on 23 May. The battalion was officially disembodied on 5 August 1919.

==== Commanders ====
The following officers commanded 1/2nd Londons:

- Lt-Col Edwin Marler, from mobilisation to 30 September 1914 (injured)
- Lt-Col James Attenborough, CMG, TD, 30 September 1914–November 1916; February–April 1917 (sick)
- Maj Gerald Stacey, DSO (acting) 18 September–9 October 1916 (killed)
- Acting Lt-Col J.P. Kellett, DSO and Bar, MC, November 1916–February 1917; May–August 1917 (wounded); January–October 1918, January 1919 to demobilisation
- A/Lt-Col R.E.F. Sneath, MC, August–December 1917 (transferred to Machine Gun Corps)
- A/Lt-Col D.H. Stevens, MC, November 1918–January 1919

=== 2/2nd Londons ===
The 2nd Line battalion was formed at Tufton Street on 21 September 1914 and was quickly recruited to full strength. The 2/2nd Londons soon gained the nickname of the 'Two and Twopennies'. (Note: Two shillings and two pennies in pre-decimal sterling currency being written as '2/2d'.) The 2nd Londons' hon colonel, Col Philip Carlebach, returned to the active list to command the battalion. Training began at Vincent Square, but the space was inadequate and the battalion soon moved to Epsom Downs Racecourse, with the men billeted in the stables and jockeys' quarters at Tattenham Corner and in buildings and railway coaches at Tattenham Corner railway station.

The battalion remained at Epsom until 15 December, when it left to join the 2/1st London Brigade, which was concentrating in Kent. The more recent recruits, who had already been formed into the 3/2nd Battalion, remained at Tattenham Corner. 2/2nd Londons were billeted in Tonbridge, but received the warning order for embarkation two days after arriving and on 23 December it entrained for Southampton and boarded HM Transport Neuralia. The battalion disembarked at Malta on 31 December 1914, allowing the 1/2nd Battalion to embark for France on 2 January 1915 (see above). The 2nd line battalion took over the rifles, Vickers-Maxim machine guns and heavy baggage left by the 1st Line; it reformed into four companies and a machine gun section. Apart from one company detached on coast defence duty, the battalion could concentrate on training during its time on Malta. Colonel Carlebach returned to the UK in August to command the 100th Provisional Battalion (see below), and Maj A.G. Houlder was promoted to succeed him.

==== Gallipoli ====
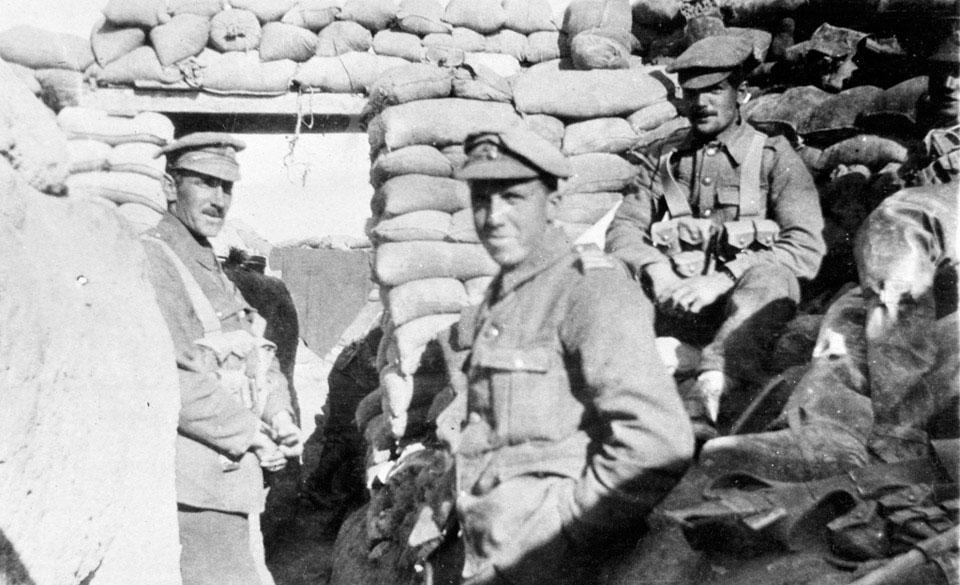
Tommies from the 2/2nd Battalion, Royal Fusiliers (City of London Regiment), who had landed at Cape Helles on 13 October and went into the line with the Royal Naval Division, pose for a photograph in the trenches on 25 December.

On 26 August the 2/2nd Londons boarded HM Transport Ivernia bound for Egypt disembarking at Alexandria on 30 August and proceeding by train to Cairo. The 2/1st London Bde was broken up in October and the battalions sent individually to reinforce formations fighting at Gallipoli. 2/2nd Londons embarked aboard HMT Simla on 5 October and then remained in Mudros harbour during a storm. It was transshipped to HMT Sarnia on 13 October and landed at Cape Helles that night. Next day it was attached to the 2nd Bde of the Royal Naval Division, alongside two battalions of Royal Marine Light Infantry (RMLI) and two more of sailors.

Parties from the 2/2nd Londons were attached to the other battalions for instruction. On 17 October two companies were sent up to the 'Eski Lines', a reserve position, though the whole area was under shellfire. They were relieved on 20 October by 2/4th Londons serving in 1st Bde, beginning a routine whereby each battalion spent a week holding the front line alternating with a week at rest or fatigues. On 15 November 2/2nd Londons and 1st RMLI assisted a limited offensive the neighbouring 52nd (Lowland) Division with rifle fire and grenades, the MG section of the 2/2nd Londons employing its two old Vickers-Maxim guns and two even older Nordenfeldts. The battalion suffered numerous casualties from Turkish shellfire. The battalion also began to lose men from sickness and exposure, exacerbated on 26 November when a storm flooded the trenches, followed by a three-day blizzard. The only machine gun on the brigade front that would fire was one of 2/2nd Londons, kept from freezing by use of glycerine and regular bursts of fire. 2/2nd Londons were relieved in the front line by 2/4th Londons on 1 December. The battalion returned to the line on 11 December as the RN Division took over some trenches from the French. On 16 December it was reinforced by a draft from 2/1st Londons attached to 29th Division, which had just been evacuated from Suvla Bay. The decision had been made to evacuate the Helles sector as well. 2/2nd Londons was relieved for the last time on 26 December, with most of the men suffering from trench foot or frostbite. Most of the battalion was withdrawn to Mudros on 1 and 3 January 1916, but two parties remained until the last night (9 January) to help the REs to lay mines. The battalion assembled at Mudros on 11 January with a strength of 20 officers and 549 ORs. The casualties during the campaign were not recorded, but 2/2nd Londons' historian estimated that the battalion had lost some 50 officers and men killed or wounded, a number died of exposure or disease, and a much larger number were evacuated sick.

==== Senussi Campaign ====
The London battalions were withdrawn from Mudros to Egypt, with 2/2nd Londons travelling aboard HMT Ionian, arriving at Alexandria on 21 January. Once in Egypt, the London battalions underwent rest and reorganisation at Beni Salama Camp, attached to 53rd (Welsh) Division. On 16 February the 2/2nd Londons were sent to join the Southern Force, with battalion HQ, A and B Companies carrying out duties with Force HQ at Beni Suef, while C and D Companies under Capt G.N. Hunter were attached to 2/4th Londons at Beni Mazar as part of Minya Force guarding the Nile against a potential attack by Senussi rebels. On 26 February Capt Hunter led a detachment of 2/2nd Londons and REs to guard the Nile bridge at Nag Hammadi. The rest of Minya Force carried out demonstration marches through local villages and practice mobilisations. The defences were later extended to Isna, some 300 miles (480 km) below Minya, and C and D Companies including the Nag Hammadi detachment were moved there on 13 March, where they were joined by Lt-Col Houlder and Battalion HQ. The detachments of 2/2nd Londons were withdrawn on 12 April and returned to Alexandria, where the 2/1st London Brigade concentrated at Sidi Bishr Camp. The men handed in their obsolete long Lee-Enfields and were issued with the SMLE short pattern. On 17 April the whole brigade embarked on HMT Transylvania and sailed to Marseille.

==== Disbandment ====
Once in France, the 2/1st London Brigade moved to Rouen, where it was disbanded. The troops were drafted, mainly to their 1st Line battalions in 56th Division preparing for the attack at Gommecourt (see above). The dispersal of 2/2nd London began on 5 May, when 3 officers and 126 other ranks (ORs) were sent to 1/2nd Londons. On 24 May 223 ORs were sent to the 1/16th Londons (Queen's Westminsters) (many of whom became casualties at Gommecourt). A large draft was also sent to 1/12th Londons (Rangers) and further drafts to 1/2nd Londons. The original 2/2nd Londons had disappeared by the middle of June, when 3/2nd Londons (see below), completing their training in the UK, were renumbered as the 'New' 2/2nd Bn.

=== 3/2nd Londons ===
The 3rd Battalion was formed at Tattenham Corner on 26 November 1914 and Lt-Col R.P. Charles of the University of London Officers' Training Corps was appointed to command it. By now voluntary recruiting was drying up, and it took some time for the battalion to reach full strength. It sent its first reinforcement draft to 1/2nd Bn in France on 16 April 1915, but retained certain 'Service' platoons of trained men for home defence. The 3rd Line battalions of the regiments of the old 1st London Brigade were now concentrated in camp at Tadworth as the 3/1st London Brigade. 3/2nd Londons joined it on 7 May, leaving Tattenham Corner to the 3/1st London Bde School of Instruction to train officers under the command of Maj L.N.G. Filon of 3/2nd Bn. 3/2nd Londons then moved with the brigade to Bury St Edmunds for home defence on 31 May, sending its unfit men to 100th Provisional Battalion (see below), and assembling a 4th Line battalion to take over the training role (see below). The 3/1st London Brigade absorbed large drafts of recruits under the Derby scheme in February 1916, and in June it moved into camp outside Ipswich.

=== New 2/2nd Londons ===
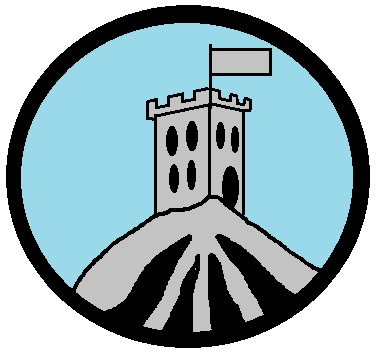
'The Tower', the formation sign of 58th (2/1st London) Division in World War I

In June 1916 the 3/2nd Bn was renumbered to replace the disbanded 2/2nd Bn (see above). The battalion formed part of 173rd (3/1st London) Brigade (popularly known as the Fusilier Brigade) in 58th (2/1st London) Division. At the time of the renumbering, the 58th Division was carrying out coast defence duties in East Anglia, but on 10 July 1916 it concentrated at Sutton Veny for final training on Salisbury Plain. In January 1917, the battalion embarked at Southampton Docks for Le Havre, and joined the division concentrated around Lucheux.

In February the division went into the line for the first time, at Ransart, south of Arras. This was considered a quiet sector, and the battalions of 173rd Bde were introduced to trench warfare by units of the 49th (West Riding) Divisions, the 2/2nd Londons being assigned to the 1/5th West Yorkshire Regiment. The battalion then did two tours of duty in the trenches. On the night of 16/17 March the 2/2nd Londons had just moved into billets in Bienvillers ready to go back into the line next day, when patrols reported that the Germans in front had begun their retreat to the Hindenburg Line. Next morning the battalion led 173rd Bde forward into the enemy trenches and pushed patrols beyond. The advance continued over succeeding days, 173rd Bde covering the whole of the divisional front, with 2/2nd Londons in support behind the leading battalions. On 20 March they came up to a German delaying position; that night 2/2nd Londons resumed the lead and on 23 March had their first contact with the enemy since arriving in France. The 58th Division having been squeezed out of the line, its troops were put to work repairing the roads and railways destroyed by the retreating enemy. 2/2nd Londons then spent a month refitting and training at the railhead at Achiet-le-Grand.

==== Bullecourt ====
Under heavy shellfire during the night of 12/13 May, 173rd Bde moved up from Achiet-le-Grand to relieve the 15th Australian Brigade, which had been attacking at the Second Battle of Bullecourt. 2/2nd Londons was in the support line, with only a single communication trench to the front and rear. The battalion immediately began digging a second trench, suffering heavy casualties from German shellfire, while also carrying water forward to the battalions in front and evacuating their casualties. Early on 15 May the German bombardment intensified and they attacked the junction of 173rd Bde and the neighbouring Australian troops, forcing an entry into the trench. They were driven out by 2/3rd Londons, reinforced by A Company of 2/2nd. A platoon carrying boxes of bombs forward to 2/4th Londons lost two third of its number from shellfire. On 16/17 May 2/2nd Londons relieved the 2/3rd, and held the line until it was relieved in turn on 21 May. During the fighting the battalion had lost 8 officers and 168 ORs killed and wounded.

On 15 June 173rd Bde attacked a section of the Hindenburg Line from 'The Knuckle' to 'The Hump', supported by the full artillery of V Corps. C Company and two platoons of A Company of 2/2nd Londons formed the left centre of the attack, with A Company of the 2/4th under command on the left. The attack had been carefully rehearsed, and tapes and duckboards had been laid to mark the forming-up positions. Zero Hour was set for 02.50, and the companies followed the barrage closely. After a struggle to overcome a number of pillboxes or Mebus, the objectives were taken and consolidated behind a standing barrage, although the two leading platoons and the 2/4th failed to recognise the objective and advanced too far, losing casualties to their own barrage. The second phase of the attack, against the Hindenburg Support line, followed the next day, the rest of 2/2nd Londons in the first wave with two companies of 2/4th under command. Preparations for this attack were hampered by a series of German counter-attacks during the night, which re-entered part of the line and some pillboxes before they were thrown out. Nevertheless, the attack succeeded in capturing 'Tunnel trench' and bombing the Germans out of their dugouts and tunnels. However, the attackers were unable to consolidate their positions in the shell-damaged line and artillery support could not be arranged. The support companies could not get through the Germans shellfire and the survivors of the three companies were bombed and attacked from both flanks. They were eventually overwhelmed, almost all being killed or taken prisoner. The battalion's casualties over the two days amounted to 2 officers and 21 OR killed, 10 officers and 207 ORs wounded, and 5 officers and 156 ORs missing.

==== Ypres ====
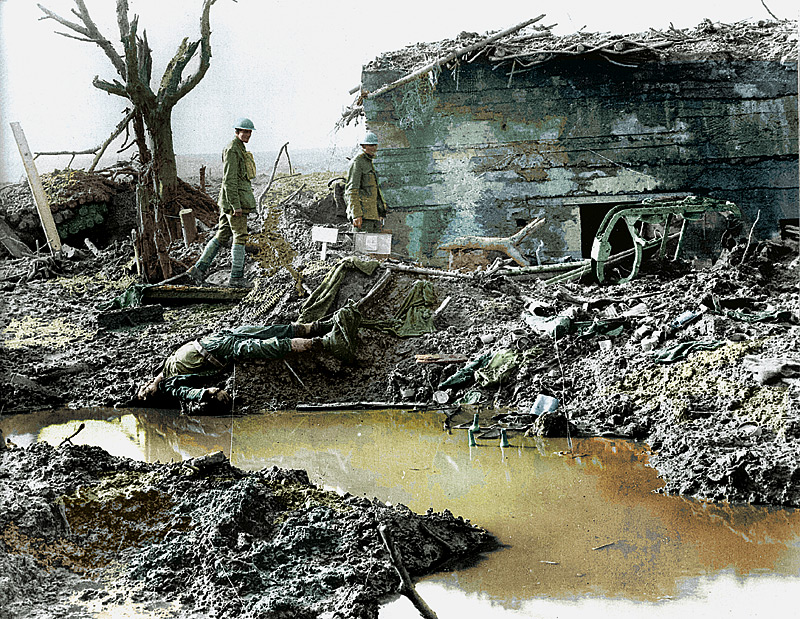
Captured German pillbox or Mebu at Passchendaele

In the three months after the fighting in the Hindenburg Line, the shattered 2/2nd Londons only did one eight-day spell in the line. Then on 24 August it moved with 58th Division to the Ypres Salient. From 1 to 10 September it carried out training at Poperinge. 173rd Brigade then took over 58th Division's front line, with 2/2nd Londons in brigade reserve, sheltering in concrete pillboxes that had been captured earlier in the Third Ypres offensive. On 18/19 September the brigade was relieved in order to prepare for the attack of 20 September (the Battle of the Menin Road Ridge). 2/2nd Londons remained in camp during this attack, with the exception of one platoon, which had been detailed to escort prisoners. Instead, the platoon was used to provide a link between 174th Bde and the neighbouring division, lying out in the outpost line for 30 hours under shellfire, bringing in many wounded from No man's land.

Although 58th Division participated in the Battle of Polygon Wood on 26 September, only 175th Bde was engaged, with 2/2nd Londons holding an inactive part of the line, though suffering numerous casualties. Afterwards the 58th went into reserve, with 2/2nd Londons spending three weeks at Louches resting, training and absorbing reinforcements.

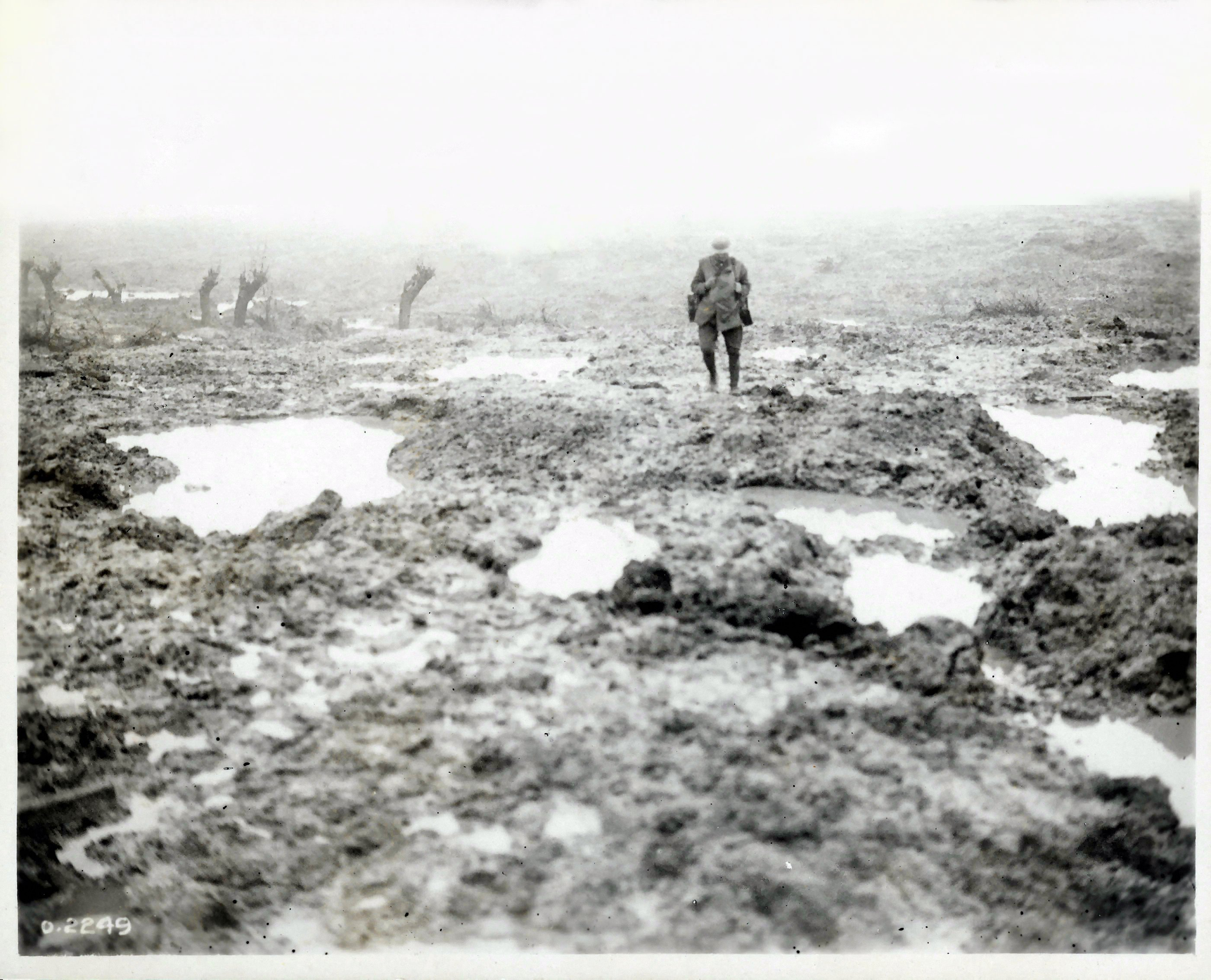
Passchendaele mud

The division returned to the line on 23 October for the Second Battle of Passchendaele. 2/2nd and 2/3rd Londons were detailed to capture and consolidate the first objective, then after 45 minutes the 2/4th Bn would leap-frog through and take 173rd Bde's second objective. But as the division arrived, the weather broke, and the pre-battle assembly in the Poelcapelle area was extraordinarily difficult. The battalion was then forced to jump off at 05.30 on 26 October from a line of flooded craters under enemy shellfire, which caused heavy casualties: A Company went into action under the command of a 19-year-old sergeant, the only officer or NCO left standing. The men struggled forward behind a weak barrage that advanced too quickly. Exhausted, with hardly a rifle able to fire because of the mud, they had to bunch up to reach the only crossing over the morass in front. D Company managed to capture the strongpoint at Tracas Farm, and B Company another, while C Company with part of B Company took five out of six pillboxes at Cameron House, coming within 100 yards (91 m) of the battalion objective. The enemy out in a strong counter-attack at 07.20 and the withdrawal of 2/3rd Bn exposed the flank of 2/2nd Bn, who were also forced to withdraw from all its gains except Tracas Farm. The battalion suffered losses on 3 officers and 36 ORs killed, 3 officers and 190 ORs wounded, and 2 officers and 151 ORs missing. Losses among senior NCOs had been particularly heavy.

The 58th Division remained at Poelcappelle to hold the line during November and December before it was transferred to the south in January 1918. Here it spent time digging defences, converting former French positions into the newly devised defences in depth. In February 1918 the battalion absorbed a draft from the disbanded 2/1st Londons in 173rd Bde, but still only had a combatant strength of 22 officers and 585 ORs.

==== Spring Offensive ====
When the German Spring Offensive opened on 21 March 1918, 58th Division was positioned astride the River Oise with 173rd Bde north of the river at La Fère. It was covering a wide frontage of about 5000 yards, with 2/2nd Londons in the Forward Zone and 2/4th Londons behind them in the Battle Zone, each company being in a 'defended locality' with a central keep and outlying redoubts, the wide spaces between being covered by machine guns. The massive German bombardment opened at 04.50 and 173rd Bde's Signal HQ was knocked out early on, so no orders went out. In A Company's area at Travecy on the battalion's left, large numbers of gas shells were sent over, casing many casualties. At 07.00 the German infantry advanced through the mist using infiltration tactics, and one by one the battalion's unsupported posts were overrun and the survivors captured, leaving only Travecy, Railway Post (covering the canal crossing) until 09.00 and Brickstack Keep, which held out until 14.00. Lieutenant-Col Richardson requested a counter-attack from the Battle Zone behind, but was refused, so at about noon he ordered the remains of battalion HQ to fight their way back. With the survivors of C Company from Main Keep, they took up a position about 500 yards (460 m) back where they made a final stand until they were overrun about 14.00; Richardson himself was badly wounded and captured. The remains of A Company in Travecy, which had been bypassed, held out until 01.00 on 23 March. The battalion's casualties had been 21 officers and 550 ORs, leaving only 1 officer and 34 ORs out of the fighting strength. These, with the rear echelons of battalion HQ, were the cadre on which the battalion would have to be rebuilt.

A mixed force under 173rd Bde (including the 8th Londons, 18th Entrenching Battalion, 182nd Tunnelling Company and dismounted cavalry) held out in the Battle Zone until the fourth day of the battle, when they made a planned withdrawal to join the rest of 58th Division. Here a composite 'Fusilier Battalion' was formed under Lt-Col Dann of the 2/4th, with Maj J.A. Miller of 2/2nd as second-in-command. It consisted of companies drawn from each of the 2/2nd, 3rd, 2/4th and held the Oise river crossings. The 2/2nd Company, reinforced by some dismounted cavalry and 114 ORs just arrived from England, took up positions covering the Quierzy bridges until the Royal Engineers could blow them up; the expected German attack was then driven off. The Fusilier battalion continued to patrol the flooded riverbank until 58th Division was relieved by the French on 2/3 April.

==== Villers Bretonneux ====
2/2nd Londons resumed its independent existence on 4 April, and travelled by rail with 58th Division to cover Villers-Bretonneux against the continuing German advance. Here the battalion was joined by large drafts of men from the 20th Londons, 1st Devons and particularly from the 12th Middlesex (nearly 500 officers and ORs), which had been disbanded in the February reorganisation and included in 18th Entrenching Battalion; all the original men of the 2/2nd were grouped in D Company. Major J.A. Miller was promoted to command the reformed 2/2nd Bn, whose first task was to establish a reserve line east of Gentelles Wood. This was done under constant shellfire, which caused numerous casualties.

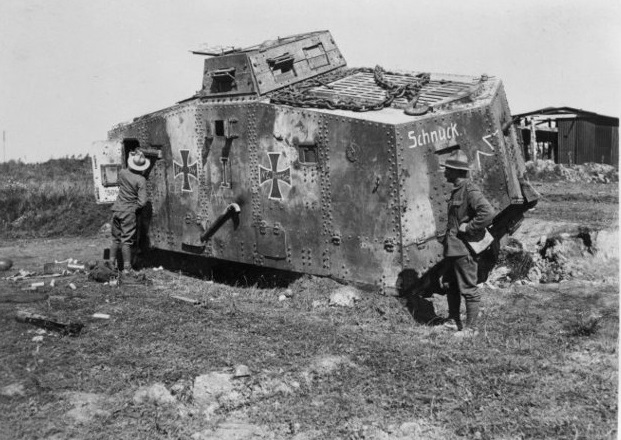
Knocked-out A7V tank

The battered 173rd Bde was not involved with the rest of the division in the First Battle of Villers-Bretonneux, but took over the front line in Hangard Wood on 17 April and was in position when the German Second Army launched the Second Battle of Villers-Bretonneux on 24 April. 2/2nd Londons were in the centre of the brigade, with three companies in line and C Company in support, tasked with counter-attacking any enemy penetration between the posts of the front line. Warned by a German deserter, the battalion was on full alert when the German bombardment opened at 04.00. It was heavy and accurate, and with a high proportion of gas shells it caused heavy casualties. The German infantry advanced at 06.00 out of the mist and the three companies in front successfully held them off. However, the neighbouring 2/4th Londons had been forced back by six German A7V tanks, which then worked round behind D Company of 2/2nd Londons. British tanks soon arrived and drove them off, but German infantry had got round that battalion's open flank and were working their way down the support line. At 07.00 Lt-Col Miller sent forward C Company, carrying as much ammunition as they could, but the German infiltration continued until 8.30, when C Company reinforced by the 2/10th Londons formed a defensive flank. However, the mist cleared at about 09.00, and German troops that had captured the high ground north of Hangard Wood now had excellent observation over the battalion's positions. Their enfilade fire forced the battalion back to the line of the Hangard road. The British line was finally stabilised about 11.30, and companies of 2/2nd and 2/10th Londons were attempting to regain Hangard Wood. Later a concentration of German infantry and tanks was broken up by artillery fire called down by A Company. A larger counter-attack was carried out that night by 9th Londons, with the remnants of 2/2nd attached; it recaptured most of Hangard Wood. The 2/2nd Battalion's casualties had been very heavy: 1 officer and 29 ORs killed, 3 officers and 127 ORs wounded, 8 officers and 301 ORs missing. D Company, with most of the battalion's original members, was wiped out, mostly captured in the front line outposts. The battalion remained in the line until 25 April, but was not engaged again.

The battalion spent the summer of 1918 working on the defences in front of Amiens. By July it had been reinforced enough to be able to hold the front line and carry out raids.

==== Chipilly ====
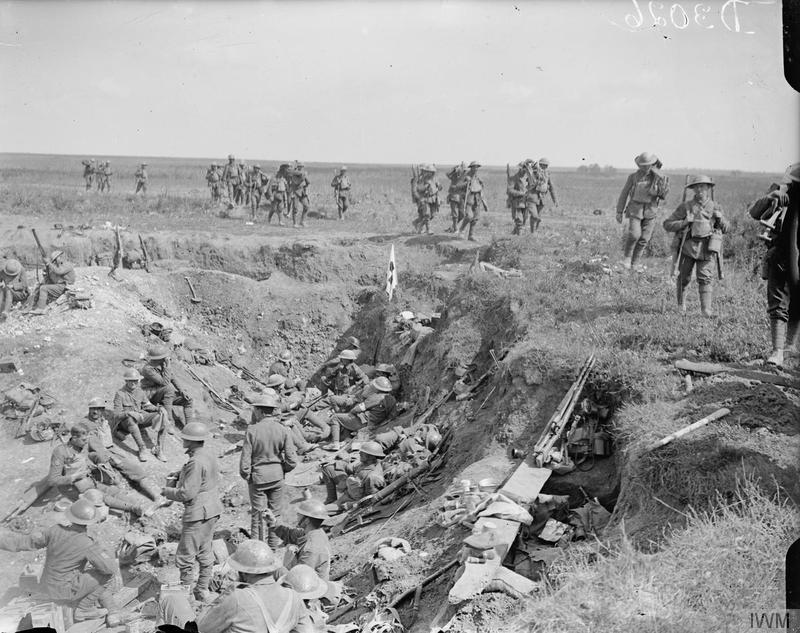
Regimental aid post near Chipilly, 10 August 1918

At the beginning of August the 58th Division was moved by motor buses to the Somme valley to take part in the forthcoming Allied counter-offensive (the Battle of Amiens). On the night of 5/6 August it took over part of the line held by 18th (Eastern) Division, from which it was to jump off on 8 August. However, the Germans put in a spoiling attack on 6 August, and 58th Division had to extemporise a new start line for its attack, wit th result that 173rd Bde was unable to carry out reconnaissance. 174th Brigade was given the initial objective of capturing Malard Wood, after which 173rd Bde would pass through to take the vital Chipilly Ridge overlooking a bend in the River Somme and flanking the battlefield. The attack was launched at 04.20 on 8 August with a surprise bombardment and large numbers of tanks, and made good progress. When 173rd Bde moved forward, however, it was caught by the German counter-barrage, and not knowing the ground it veered off to the left in the morning mist. At 08.30 174th Bde had not yet cleared Malard Wood, and the two leading battalions of 173rd Bde were mixed up with it. When they emerged form the wod they were met by a hail of machine gun fire. As the support battalion, 2/2nd Londons arrived at 10.00, and Lt-Col Miller began reorganising the mixed up units in front. The barrage had gone on to Chipilly, and offered no support. A renewed attack, behind a new barrage, was attempted by 2/2nd Londons in the afternoon but was also turned back into Malard Wood by the machine gun fire from the village. 58th Division continued to attack Chipilly that afternoon and next morning. US troops were brought up to reinforce the division and a new attack was ordered for 17.30 on 9 August, with Lt-Col Miller organising the advanced troops of 173rd Bde. 2/2nd Londons, now reduced to just 150–200 fighting men, attacked on the left of the brigade. The barrage was heavu but inaccurate, falling in the valley rather than the village on the ridge, and the German machine guns remained in action. Halted at a sunken road on the slope, 2/2nd Londons began to dig in, but 2/10th Londons, sent up from brigade reserve, had been able to work their way round Chipilly, clearing the machine guns and allowing the American troops to surge forward on the other flank. The Germans hurriedly abandoned the ridge. In the two days of the battle 2/2nd Londons had lost 7 officers and 272 ORs. 58th Division was relieved on 13 August and marched to Pont-Noyelles where 2/2nd Londons received a draft of 314 NCOs and men. It then moved on to the rest area at Querrieu, where Acting Lt-Col J. Walsh of the Northumberland Fusiliers succeeded Lt-Col Miller in command.

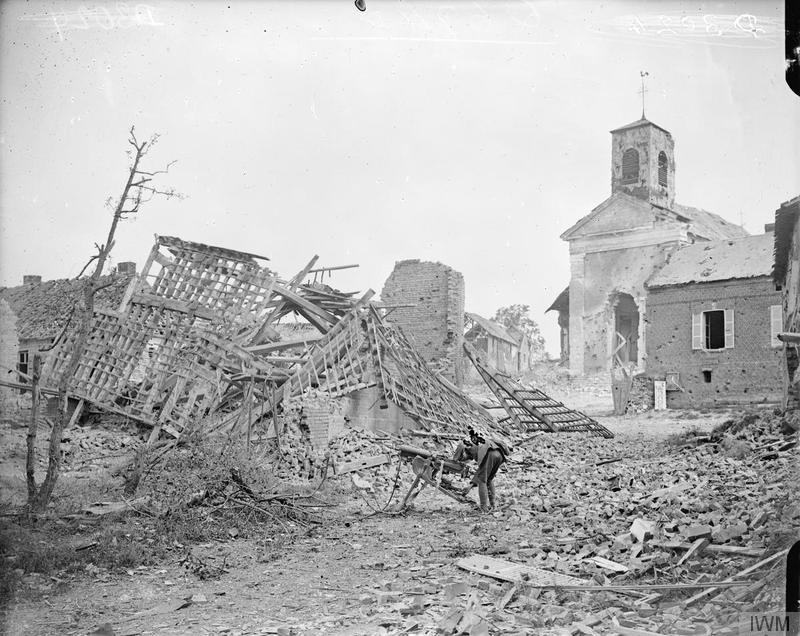
The ruins of Chipilly after its capture

==== Bapaume ====
The Second Battle of Bapaume opened on 22 August and was continued with a night attack on 23/24 August, in which 173rd Bde supported 175th Bde and 47th (1/2nd London) Division. A dawn attack on 25 August with 173rd Bde in close support found the German positions empty, and 2/4th Londons were sent in pursuit, supported by 2/2nd Londons. At 16.30 2/2nd Londons captured Billon trench on the high ground ahead. The following morning 2/2nd Londons dropped back into brigade reserve while the other battalions attacked Maricourt; later it moved up to 'mop up' the captured village. On 28 August 2/2nd Londons led the brigade's attack, and all objectives were taken. The battalion was then withdrawn having suffered casualties of 2 officer and 53 OR killed, 6 officers and 252 ORs wounded, and 59 ORs missing. On 31 August the battalion was bussed up to the line at short notice to join in a dawn attack towards Bouchavesnes on 1 September. With 2/2nd Londons in support 173rd Bde followed a creeping barrage and achieved all its objectives, ending the day overlooking the Canal du Nord; casualties were light. The battalion then spent the early days of September resting and training.

==== Épehy ====
The Allies were now closing up towards the Hindenburg Line. On 10 September 58th Division attacked the villages round Épehy which formed the outposts of that line. 173rd Brigade led, with 2/2nd Londons attacking Pezières with 2/4th Londons in close support to 'mop up'; the final objective was Prince Reserve trench, east of the villages. The brigade moved forward behind a creeping barrage at 05.15 and struggled through the villages against stubborn opposition from the German Alpine Corps. Elements of 2/2nd Londons reached Prince Reserve trench, but the brigade was too weak to clear all the machine gun posts in the villages and the battalion found itself almost surrounded. 2/2nd Londons fought their way back to a line just outside Pezières. An attempt to infiltrate back into the village with 175th Bde that afternoon also failed. 2/2nd Londons withdrew to Guyencourt-Saulcourt, having lost 9 officers and 164 ORs. Two days later at Liéramont it absorbed the whole of 2/4th Londons, which ceased to exist as a separate unit.

58th Division's probing attack showed that it would require a formal operation to clear the Hindenburg outposts. This (the Battle of Épehy) was launched on 18 September. Once again 2/2nd Londons attacked Pezières, with two companies of 3rd Londons alongside, supported by two tanks and with the newly arrived 2/24th Londons following as 'moppers-up'. The assembly was hindered by heavy gas shelling, but the attack went in on time at 05.30 behind a creeping barrage. Within an hour the battalion had taken Pezières and reached the railway embankment beyond. There was confusion at brigade HQ, but it could be seen that the Germans were bombarding their old positions in the village so it was assumed that it had been captured. One of the tanks was detailed to turn off and help 12th (Eastern) Division into Épehy, but it fired on friendly troops by mistake, causing a gap to open between 173rd Bde and that division. Nevertheless, 2/2nd Londons advanced towards their second objective, Fir Support trench, and soon held most of it. B Company reached the final objective, Poplar trench, but were too weak to hold it and fell back. Lieutenant-Col Walsh was ordered to make another attack on Poplar trench, which he launched at 21.00, but which only succeeded in establishing some posts close to the trench. The battalion tried again at 11.00 next morning, supported only by the brigade trench mortars, and slowly bombed its way along, finally clearing it by 19.00. The brigade was relieved on 20 September, 2/2nd Londons returning to Guyencourt having lost 7 officers and 176 ORs.

==== Final advance ====
58th Division was rested after Épehy and moved north by train to join First Army, going into the line between Lens and Loos on 29 September. The Allied armies had launched a series of coordinated assaults on 27 September that had breached the Hindenburg Line. The Germans began withdrawing all along the front: 173rd Bde pushed forward on 2 October and found the enemy positions abandoned. The brigade advanced through the mining villages round Lens and continued until enemy resistance stiffened on 4 October. 2/2nd Londons was in brigade reserve while the rest of the division patrolled forwards. Then on 11 October the enemy resumed their retreat and the battalion moved through Harnes into the Canal Maze trenches on the bank of the Souchez Canal. On 13 October it sent fighting patrols forward, which contacted the enemy along the Haute Deûle Canal, where the enemy was holding the buildings of a distillery and a chemical works. The battalion attacked these positions next morning after they had been bombarded, but made little progress and the action dissolved into patrol actions. However, at dawn on 15 October it was reported that the Germans had resumed their withdrawal, and the battalion crossed the canal by extemporised footbridges.

173rd Brigade now went into divisional reserve, concentrating round Harnes. The division switched to Fifth Army's command, but continued to advance in the same line. 173rd Brigade passed through on 19/20 October and led the division into Belgium. 2/2nd Londons were mainly employed on road repair. The Germans were holding the line of the River Schelde in strength, and 173rd Bde was ordered to force a crossing on 22 October. 2/2nd Londons was brought up from billets and assembled at Bléharies while the REs launched rafts opposite Espain. B and D Companies attempted to cross, and one platoon actually gained a footing on the opposite bank before being driven back by machine gun fire. The battalion renewed its attempt on 26 October, but was again stopped by enfilade machine gun fire. On the night of 27/28 October 173rd Bde was withdrawn for rest and training. 2/2nd Londons returned to the outpost line opposite Espain on 6 November. Early next morning the Germans fired a heavy concentration of gas shells into Bléharies, causing numerous casualties both to troops and civilians, and forcing B and D Companies on the edge of the village to evacuate the contaminated ground. On the morning of 8 November the mayor of la Plaigne on the far side of the river informed the battalion that the Germans had evacuated la Plaigne and Cin. 2/2nd Londons was ordered to cross over, and with B Company helping the REs with rafts and bridges, A Company established a bridgehead at Cin and occupied la Plaigne while C Company exploited beyond. By mid-afternoon the battalion was established on the line Rœux–Sart Colin. 174th and 175th Brigades continued the advance from that line until hostilities ended on 11 November. During the fin al operations of October and November, 2/2nd Londons lost 1 officer and 14 ORs killed, 4 officers and 62 ORs wounded, and 3 ORs missing.

2/2nd Londons had moved up to Basècles on 11 November 1918, and it remained there for the next four months as demobilisation got under way. The regimental history records that 2/2nd Londons was disbanded at Stambruges on 26 February 1919, but in fact cadres of all units in 58th Division continued at Leuze until they sailed home in June 1919. 2/2nd Battalion, London Regiment, was officially disbanded at Tufton Street on 6 August 1918.

=== 4/2nd Londons ===
The 4/2nd Battalion was formed in May 1915 to train drafts for the two battalions already serving overseas and the 3/2nd Bn preparing to go overseas in 58th Division. It briefly joined 173rd Bde in 58th Division in East Anglia, then in January 1916 the reserve battalions for the whole 1st London Brigade were concentrated on Salisbury Plain. On 8 April the unit's title was changed to 2nd (Reserve) Bn, London Regiment, forming part of the 1st London Reserve Group. On 1 September 1916 the 2nd Reserve Bn was absorbed by the 1st Reserve Bn, and continued training recruits for the rest of the war in 1st London (Reserve) Bde.

=== 29th Londons ===
In June 1915, a reorganisation saw the men of the 3/1st London Brigade (Note: According to the regimental history of the 4th Londons; however, the Army Council Instruction establishing the provisional battalions specified that 100th Provisional Bn was actually composed of men from the 1st, 2nd, 4th and 7th Londons.) who were unfit or unavailable for overseas service separated out into a composite battalion, the 100th Provisional Battalion under the command of Col Carlebach of the 2nd Londons. This was stationed at Aldeburgh, guarding the East Coast as part of 6th Provisional Brigade. In August, all the men of the Provisional Battalion were returned to their units except those who had not volunteered for overseas service. These Home Service men continued serving in home defence until 1916, when the Military Service Act swept away the Home/Overseas service distinction and the provisional battalions took on the dual role of home defence and physical conditioning to render men fit for drafting overseas. On 1 January 1917 the 100th Provisional Battalion absorbed the 102nd Provisional Battalion (the Home Service details of the 9th (QVR), 10th (Hackney) and 12th (Rangers) Bns, London Regiment) and officially became the 29th (City of London) Battalion, London Regiment. The battalion never served overseas, and was demobilised early in 1919.

It is estimated that about 8133 men served in the 2nd Londons at some point during the war, and a further 3681 passed through the 29th Londons. The Roll of Honour published in the regimental history lists 1335 men who died while serving with 2nd Londons during World War I.

== Interwar ==
The TF was reconstituted on 7 February 1920 and the battalion was reformed at Tufton Street, under the command of Lt-Col M.F. Scott, who had commanded A Company of 1/2nd Londons in 1914–15. Major J. Walsh of the Northumberland Fusiliers, who had commanded 2/2nd Londons from August 1918 until February 1919, was appointed as its first adjutant. The London Regiment had fallen into abeyance in 1916 and the battalions were treated as independent regiments affiliated to their previous parent regiments, so the battalion was now designated 2nd (City of London Battalion) London Regiment (Royal Fusiliers), simplified in 1922 to 2nd City of London Regiment (Royal Fusiliers). The TF was reorganised in 1921 as the Territorial Army (TA).

Once again the battalion was in 167th (1st London) Bde in 56th (1st London) Division. These became simply '1st London Bde' and '1st London Division' after 47th (2nd London) Division was disbanded in 1935.

The London Regiment was formally disbanded in 1938, the battalion having transferred to the Royal Fusiliers on 31 August 1937 as 9th (2nd City of London) Battalion, Royal Fusiliers (City of London Regiment). (Note: Not to be confused with the 9th (Service) Battalion, a 'Kitchener's Army' unit of the Royal Fusiliers that served in World War I.) In that year the battalion moved its HQ from Tufton St to 213 Balham High Road in South London.

== World War II ==
=== Mobilisation ===
After the Munich Crisis the TA was doubled in size, and 9th Royal Fusiliers formed a duplicate 2/9th Battalion at South Ruislip with its first officers being commissioned on 14 June 1939; it was shortly afterwards designated 12th Battalion, Royal Fusiliers. (Note: Not to be confused with the 12th (Service) Battalion, another Kitchener's Army unit.)

Full mobilisation for the TA was ordered on 1 September 1939, two days before the declaration of war; 9th Royal Fusiliers mobilised next day at Balham High Street. While 9th Bn remained in 1st London Infantry Brigade in 1st London Division, the 12th Bn was assigned to 4th London Infantry Bde in a reconstituted 2nd London Division.

=== 9th Royal Fusiliers ===
The formation sign of 56th (London) Division featured Dick Whittington's cat.

9th Royal Fusiliers served in home defence with 1st London Division (56th (London) Division once more from November 1940). The division was initially organised as a motor division but reverted to a normal infantry organisation during 1940. In August 1942 the division embarked for the Middle East, joining Persia and Iraq Command (PAIC) in November. By the time it arrived, the threat to the Persian oilfields had diminished with the British victory at El Alamein and the lack of German progress at the Battle of Stalingrad. 56th Division was therefore selected for the planned Allied invasion of Sicily (Operation Husky), and had to move 3,200 miles (5,100 km) across North Africa in a month. After seeing some action in the final stages of the Tunisian campaign, the division was held back from Husky, and instead landed at Salerno on the Italian mainland in Operation Avalanche in September 1943.

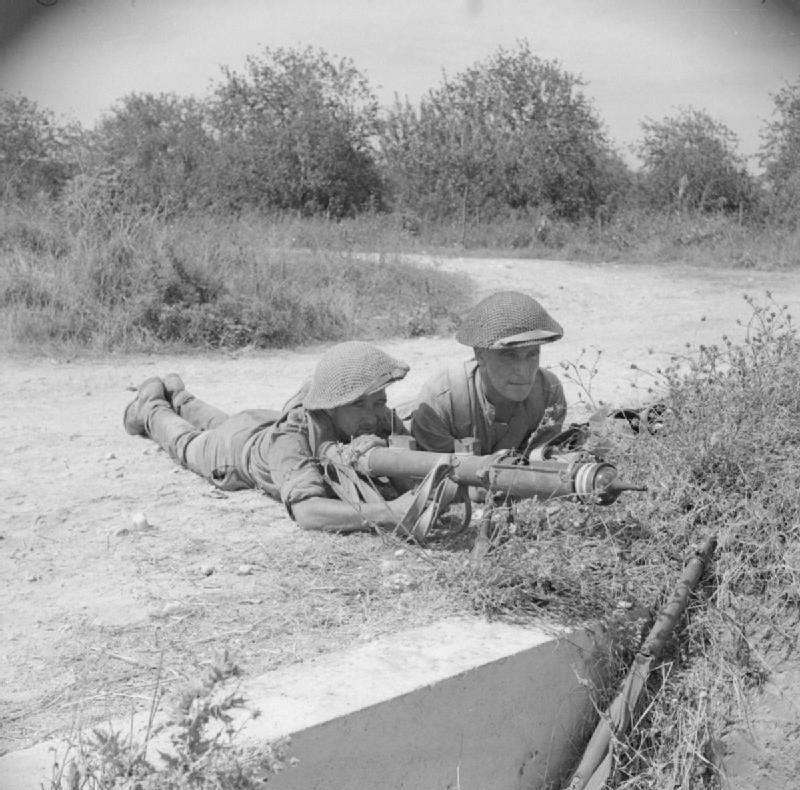
Men of the 9th Battalion, Royal Fusiliers manning a PIAT during the Battle of Salerno, 10 September 1943

9th Royal Fusiliers suffered very heavy casualties in trying to hold the town of Battipaglia against fierce German counter-attacks on the Salerno breachhead. Over the following weeks the division fought its way up Italy. Then in February 1944 it was pulled out and sent by sea to reinforce the Anzio beachhead, where it arrived in time to fend off a German counter-attack. Trench warfare continued at Anzio for months, and by 28 March 56th Division was so weak that it was sent by sea to Egypt for recuperation.

56th Division returned to Italy in July 1944 for the attack on the Gothic Line (Operation Olive). Once the Allies had broken into the German positions, 56th Division was used to widen the breach on 1 September, and then on 3 September to lead the pursuit, taking Monte Maggiore. There followed hard methodical fighting to clear the Germans off successive ridge and river lines. The battalion distinguished itself in the fighting at Croce on .5–8 September.

Owing to a shortage of reinforcements in the Mediterranean theatre in 1944, the 9th (2nd London) Bn absorbed the 8th (1st London) Bn, Royal Fusiliers, on 23 September 1944. In compliment to the 8th Bn, the 9th Royal Fusiliers redesignated its A, B C and D Companies as W, X, Y and Z. (Note: Traditionally, some battalions of the Royal Fusiliers designated their companies W, X, Y and Z rather than A, B, C and D.)

For Eighth Army's Spring offensive in 1945 (Operation Grapeshot), 56th Division was responsible for the operations on Lake Comacchio to outflank the Senio line. 9th Royal Fusiliers fought its way across and along the River Reno and then through the Argenta Gap. 56th Division then pursued the enemy to the River Po. 9th Royal Fusiliers reached the river bank on 25 April and immediately crossed the 600 yards (550 m) river by means of small boats before the Germans could organise their defences. The division reached Venice on 29 April before the Surrender of Caserta came into force on 2 May, ending hostilities in the Italian theatre. 56th Division was made responsible for protecting lines of communication to the disputed city of Trieste in the immediate aftermath of the fighting, and 9th (2nd London) Bn, Royal Fusiliers, was still in the city when the battalion formally passed into suspended animation on 6 April 1946.

=== 12th Royal Fusiliers ===
'Bow Bells', the formation sign of 47th Infantry Division in World War II

12th Royal Fusiliers mobilised at Balham under the command of Lt-Col L.A.M. Bates-Oldham. When war broke out on 3 September 1939 the battalion was defending RAF Kenley. 2nd London Division, like the 1st, was organised as a motor division in Eastern Command, stationed in and around London. 12th Royal Fusiliers was stationed in the London Docks in January 1940, moving to Dunstable in February. When the Germans invaded the Low Countries on 10 May the battalion was immediately moved to Chelmsford in Essex on anti-invasion duties. After the British Expeditionary Force was evacuated from Dunkirk, the division was converted on 4 June 1940 into a standard infantry division for home defence under Western Command. 12th Royal Fusiliers moved to Tatton Hall Camp near Knutsford in Cheshire, then on 25 July to Pembroke in South Wales. In November he battalion moved to Malvern Link in Worcestershire for the winter. On 21 November, 2nd London Division regained its historic title of 47th (2nd London) Division, with 4th London Bde becoming 140 (London) Bde.

In January 1941 Lt-Col Stansby took over command of the battalion. On 16 February 1941 47th (2nd L) Division transferred to IV Corps (later to V Corps) and manned coast defences in West Sussex. 12th Royal Fusiliers was stationed at Bognor Regis, moving to Halnaker Camp in July, and to Middleton-on-Sea in October. However, in December 1941 the division was placed on a lower establishment, an acknowledgement that it was unlikely to see overseas service and its role would be coast defence and supplying reinforcements to other formations.

In January 1942 the battalion moved to Dorset, where it was stationed at Bournemouth under the command of Lt-Col W.M. Graham. Sergeant Pick was awarded the George Medal for disarming a soldier who had become insane and killed two members of the regimental police. On 12 October, Royal Fusiliers moved to Bushfield Camp, Winchester, in Hampshire, then in November to Hayling Island, Purbrook and Cosham. In early 1943 it was on the Isle of Wight, first at Whitwell, then at Shanklin.

Since July 1942 the battalion had provided reinforcement drafts to the 2nd, 8th and 20th Battalions of the Royal Fusiliers. On 17 September 1943 12th Royal Fusiliers transferred to 211 Bde in 80th (Reserve) Division, losing its coast defence role and becoming purely a draft-finding unit. It now found drafts for many regiments, including the Coldstream Guards, Royal West Kents, Hampshires, Middlesex, East Surreys and Queen's Regiment. The battalion was stationed for nearly a year at Ripley Barracks, Lancaster, then moved to Southwold in Suffolk (22 July 1944), where it briefly rejoined 47th (Reserve) Division. Then in October it moved to Wrentham, Suffolk and then to Shorncliffe where on 30 October 1944 it became a Primary Training Centre, training recruits for all arms of service.

On 28 March 1945 12th Royal Fusiliers (PTC) lapsed into suspended animation, the administrative staff being transferred to the Parachute Regiment for duty with No 2 Army Air Corps Infantry Training Centre.

== Postwar ==
Formation sign of 56th (London) Armoured Division

When the TA was reconstituted on 1 January 1947 the 9th and 12th Battalions were reformed at Balham High Road as 624 Light Anti-Aircraft Regiment, Royal Artillery (Royal Fusiliers) with HQ at [Balham?] Streatham It served as the LAA regiment of 56th (London) Armoured Division.

When Anti-Aircraft Command was disbanded in 1955 there was a major reduction in the number of AA units, and 624th LAA absorbed 526th (Mixed) LAA/Searchlight Regiment, RA (27th London Electrical Engineers), which formed R Company. Later its title was changed to 624 LAA Rgt (9th Bn Royal Fusiliers (City of London Regiment).

There were further reductions in the TA, and on 1 May 1961, the 624th LAA Rgt reconverted back to infantry and merged into 8th (1st City of London) Battalion, Royal Fusiliers to form the City of London Battalion, Royal Fusiliers.

== Heritage & ceremonial ==
=== Uniforms and insignia ===
The original uniform of the 46th (London & Westminster) RVC was a drab grey ('Volunteer grey') with green facings, black belt and accoutrements, and a black Shako topped with a green tuft. Officers' uniforms were laced with silver. In 1876 the uniform style was changed from Rifle to Line: the tunic colour became scarlet with blue facings and white belts and accoutrements, the shako blue with a red and white tuft until 1878 when the regulation infantry pattern helmet was adopted. Officers also adopted a frogged undress uniform with a Cheesecutter cap.

After the unit became the 2nd VB, Royal Fusiliers, it adopted Fusilier 'grenade' collar badges, but the raccoon-skin Fusilier Cap only slowly replaced the helmet. After the Boer War a white Hackle on the right hand side of the cap was adopted. Silver lace was worn by the officers to distinguish them from regular officers with gold lace; this distinction was dropped when the TF was formed.

Full dress was worn for field training, with the addition of black leggings. Later a simplified red serge tunic with blue facings was adopted for field training, replaced by blue serge and finally khaki service dress in the TF. When the London Regiment was formed in the TF, the battalion was allowed to retain its Royal Fusiliers uniform for full dress. The last time this was worn was at a Royal Review in 1913, when the officers, band and drums still wore the racoon skin cap. The battalion retained the Royal Fusiliers' badge with the addition of a scroll underneath bearing the battalion's title.

In April 1917 1/2nd Londons wore a circular green recognition patch on each shoulder and painted on each side of the helmet.

=== Memorials ===
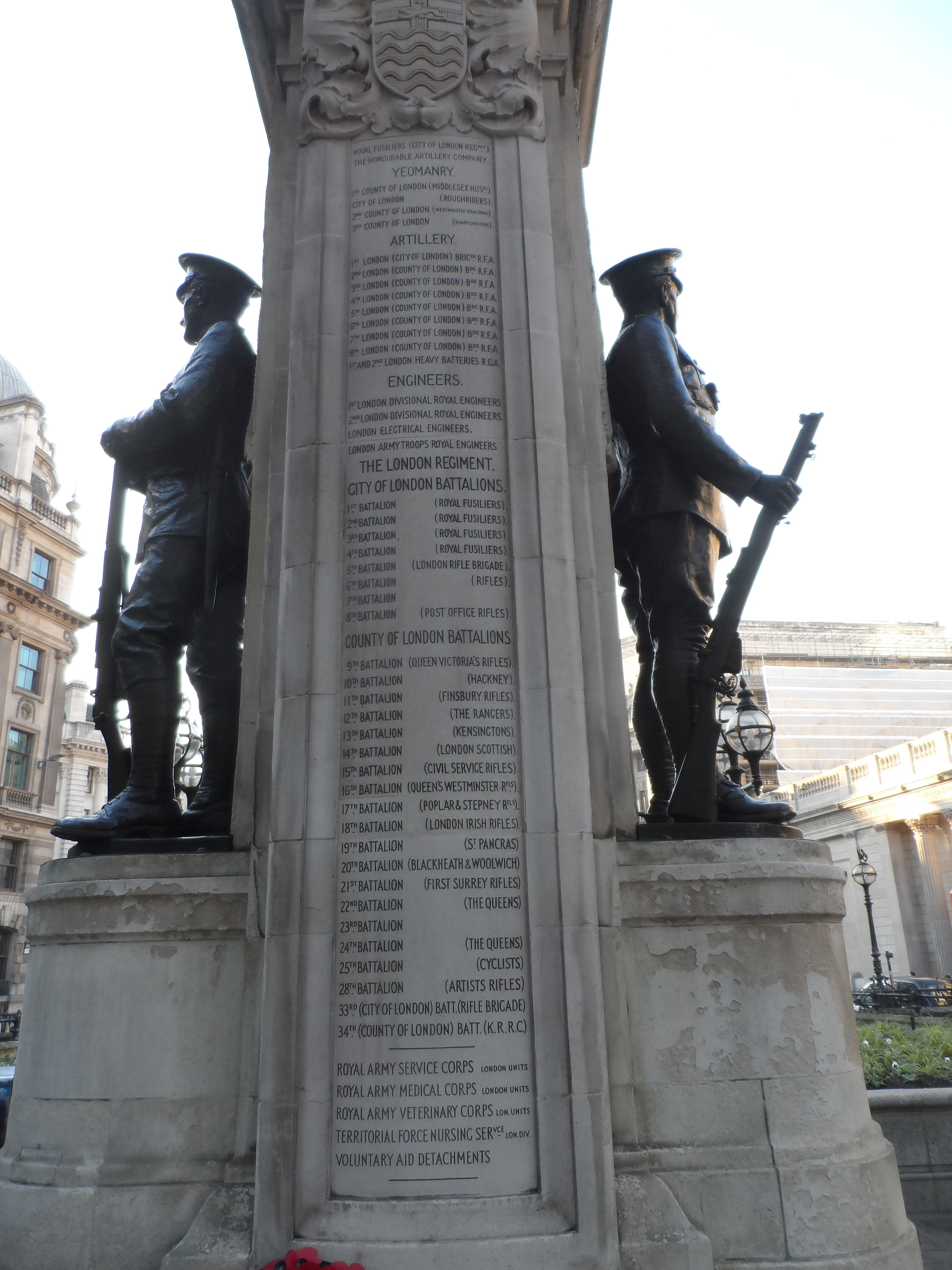
The battalion on the London Troops Memorial in the City of London

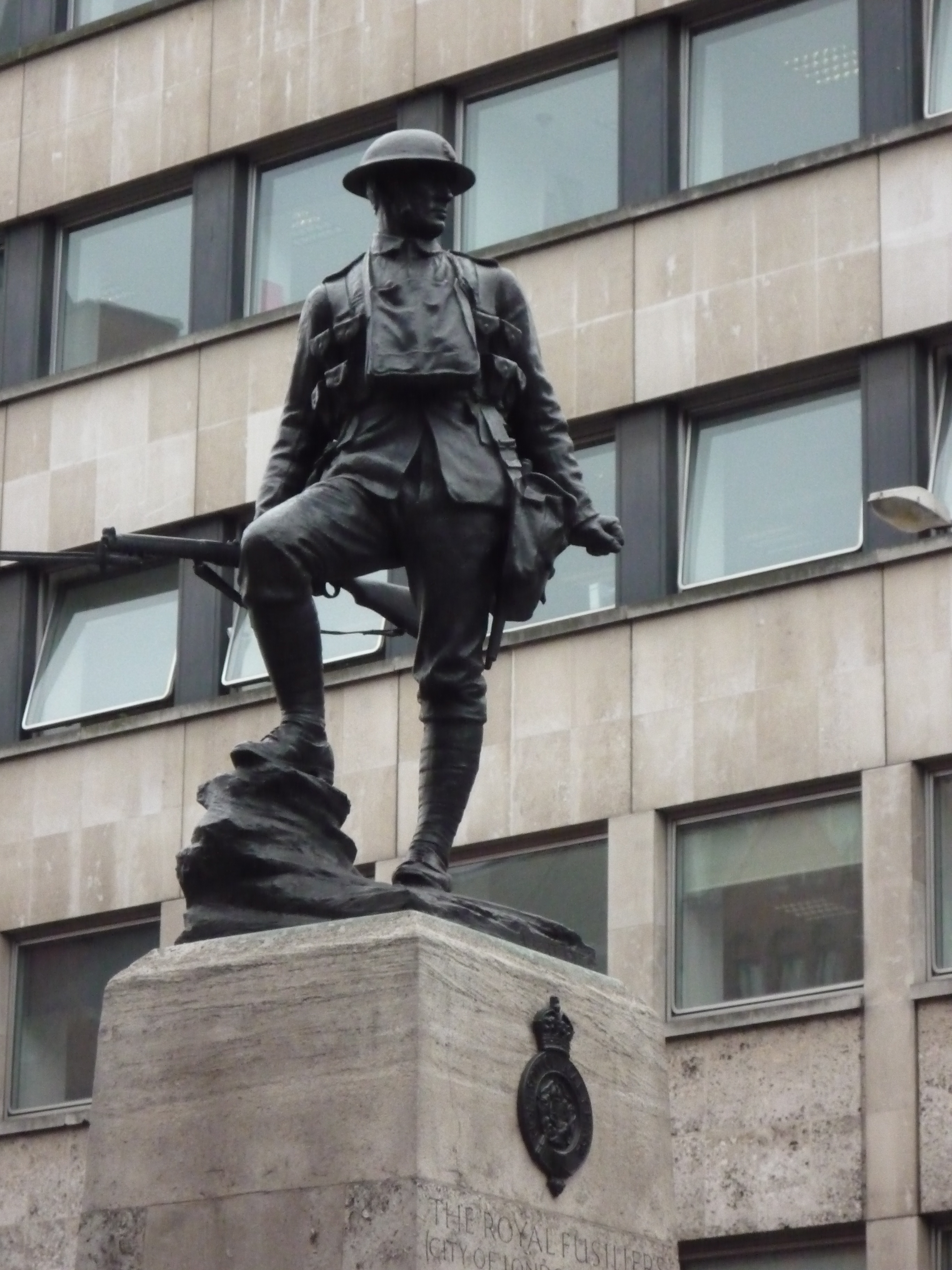
Royal Fusiliers Memorial at Holborn Bar

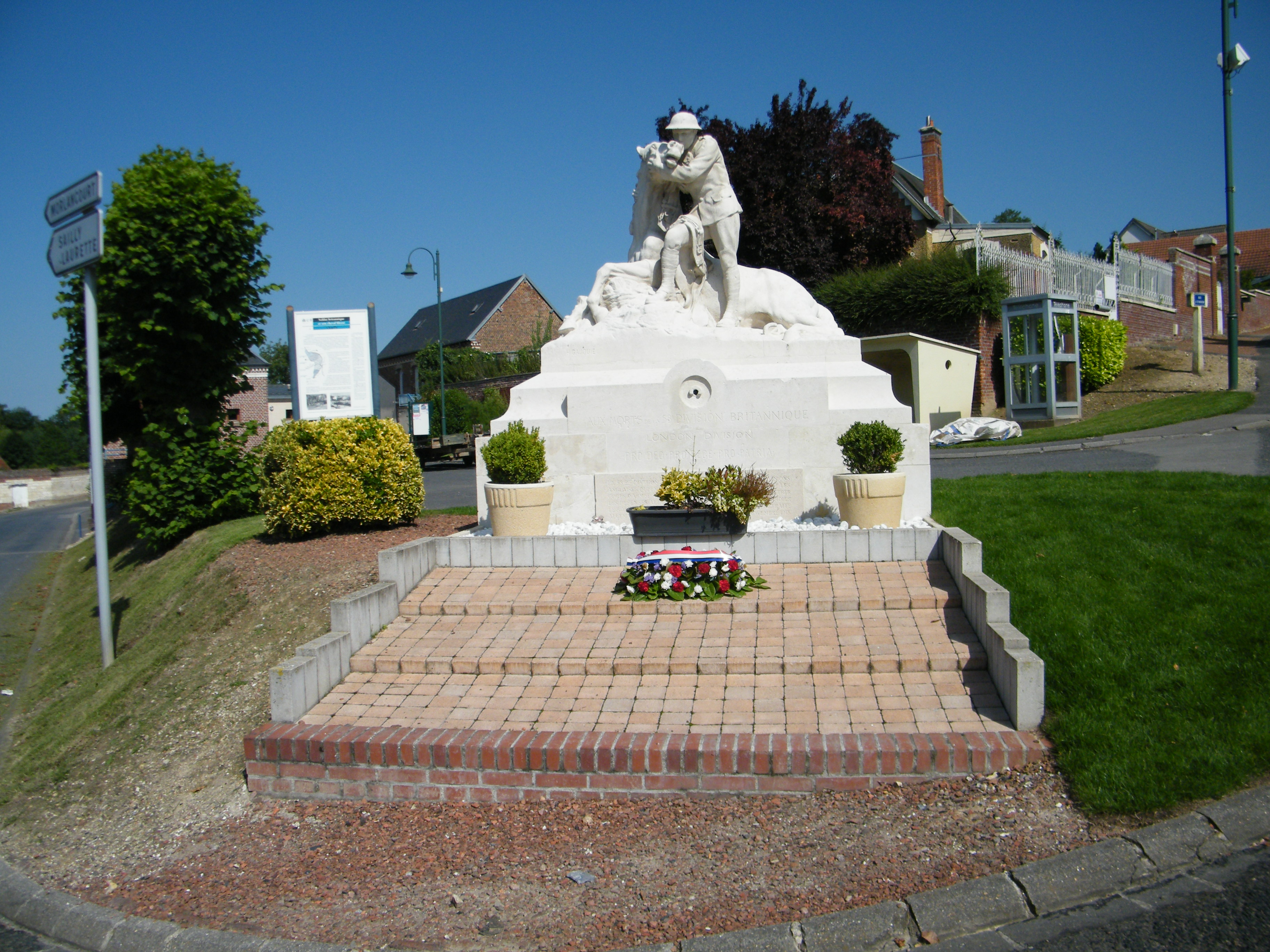
58th Division's monument at Chipilly

The 2nd London Battalion is listed on the City and County of London Troops Memorial in front of the Royal Exchange, with architectural design by Sir Aston Webb and sculpture by Alfred Drury. The right-hand (southern) bronze figure flanking this memorial depicts an infantryman representative of the various London infantry units. Each unit on the memorial was presented with a small bronze plaque; that of the 2nd Londons is at the Army Reserve Centre, 213 Balham High Road.

The battalion is also listed on the pedestal of the Royal Fusiliers War Memorial at Holborn Bar, which is surmounted by a bronze figure of a Fusilier sculpted by Albert Toft. In the absence abroad of the Regular battalions when it was unveiled on 4 November 1922, a composite Guard of Honour formed from the four Territorial battalions paraded under the regimental colour of the 2nd Londons.

The 2nd Londons' own war memorial, a brass tablet and roll of honour was unveiled at the Drill Hall at Tufton Street on 24 June 1922, beneath a tablet of similar design to the dead of the Second Boer War. The memorial is now at the Army Reserve Centre, 213 Balham High Road. The roll of honour is now in the Royal Fusiliers' Regimental Chapel in St Sepulchre-without-Newgate in Holborn,

The 58th Divisional Memorial, depicting a wounded horse sculpted by Henri Gauquie, is at Chipilly. It was paid for from the profits of the divisional entertainment canteen and barber shop.

The regimental colours of the 2nd Londons presented in 1909 are in the Officers' Mess at the Army Reserve Centre in Balham High Road. The King's colour of the 2/2nd Londons presented in 1918 is in St Sepulchre, that of the 3/2nd Londons in the Royal Fusiliers' Museum in the Tower of London.

=== Battle Honours ===
The 2nd London Regiment and 9th Royal Fusiliers were awarded the following Battle honours:
Second Boer War:
South Africa, 1900–02
World War I:
Somme, 1916, '18, Albert, 1916, '18, Guillemont, Ginchy, Flers-Courcelette, Morval, Le Transloy, Arras, 1917 '18, Scarpe, 1917 '18, Bullecourt, Ypres, 1917 Langemarck, 1917, Menin Road, Polygon Wood, Passchendaele, Cambrai, 1917, St Quentin, Villers Bretonneux, Amiens, Bapaume, 1918, Hindenburg Line, Épehy, Canal du Nord, Valenciennes, Sambre, France and Flanders 1915–18, Gallipoli 1915–16, Egypt, 1915–16.
World War II:
Djebel Tebega, North Africa 1943, Salerno, St Lucia, Battipaglia, Teano, Monte Camino, Garigliano Crossing, Damiano, Anzio, Gothic Line, Coriano, Croce, Valli di Comacchio, Argenta Gap, Italy 1943–45

The honours in bold were those chosen to be emblazoned on the King's colour.

=== Honorary Colonels ===
The following served as Honorary Colonel of the regiment:

- Lt-Col Sir Charles Russell, 3rd Baronet, VC, formerly Grenadier Guards, appointed 2 July 1877, died 14 April 1883.
- Field Marshal Viscount Wolseley, appointed 1 May 1883, resigned 1906.
- Col Albert L. Keller, VD, former CO, appointed 16 December 1906, died August 1907.
- Lt-Col Philip Carlebach, CMG, TD, former CO, appointed 17 December 1910.
- Col Viscount Wakefield, GCVO, CBE, TD, former Lord Mayor of London, appointed 28 May 1921.

==== Other prominent members ====
- Sir John Shelley, 7th Baronet, MP, first CO.
- William Campbell, 2nd Baron Stratheden and Campbell, 2iC and twice acting CO.
- H. O. Arnold-Forster, former Secretary of State for War.
- Billy Cotton, future bandleader; served at Gallipoli and later commissioned into the Royal Flying Corps.
