= National Library for the Blind =

- Location: United Kingdom
- Established: 1882
- Dissolved: 1 January 2007

The National Library for the Blind (NLB) was a public library in the United Kingdom, founded 1882, which aimed to ensure that people with sight problems have the same access to library services as sighted people. NLB was taken over by the Royal National Institute of Blind People on 1 January 2007 and incorporated into the RNIB National Library Service.

== History ==
=== Origins ===
The Lending Library for the Blind began its service to readers on Monday, 9 October 1882. The library was a private charitable venture by Martha Arnold who was blind since childhood. It was accommodated in a small room of her house at 73 Fairfax Road, South Hampstead, London. Carlota Dow was Arnold's first assistant; the two ladies ran the library on a voluntary basis with the assistance of a few friends.

Arnold intended that the Library should "bring solace and light" and that it should help to "raise the literary standard of the blind". There were no more than fifty volumes on the shelves when the Library opened its doors to its first ten registered readers.

The library initially opened on Monday afternoons to the blind readers who were in a position to call in person. Parcels of books were sent off to 'country members' on the first and third Mondays of each month. Volumes were issued for four weeks each.

The annual subscription for borrowers was 4s. 4d., which was one penny a week, but those 'in better circumstances' were expected to pay half a guinea. During the library's first five years, the number of readers increased to about one hundred and the stock to 750 volumes (600 in braille, 130 in Moon type, and 20 in Lucas systems of printing for the blind). Due to needing more space for book-stock, Arnold moved to 28 Boundary Road, in 1886, then to 114 Belsize Road, London, in 1887.

The stocks of books in Moon type and Lucas systems had mostly been presented to the library and some of the braille books had been purchased on special terms from the Royal National Institute of Blind People, which was known as the British and Foreign Blind Society at the time. Much of the braille had been hand-transcribed by voluntary workers. Arnold transcribed some of the titles and trained some of her friends to write braille.

The library and the number of its readers grew steadily during the last decade of the nineteenth century. By 1899, it was serving 300 readers with a stock of 3,200 volumes. Approximately 1,500 'boxes, parcels and hampers' were being sent out each year.

=== Incorporation ===
Towards the end of Arnold's life, the library began to experience serious growing pains. After many delays, the library was registered as the Incorporated National Lending Library for the Blind on 15 September 1898. Dow was particularly active during this uncomfortable transition period.

The annual membership fee charged to blind readers was raised in stages to two guineas. The poorest readers were allowed to pay less – in the hardest cases very substantially less – but only after the committee had considered individual applications for remission.

The first paid staff were recruited: Miss McLaren as Secretary and Miss Lohr as Librarian. These appointments considerably eased the difficulties of day-to-day routine, but the accommodation problem became steadily acute. By 1904, the stock had grown to nearly 8,000 volumes, with yearly addition of more than 500.

The library moved to new premises – an adapted shop and basement at 125 Queen's Road, Bayswater – in September 1904. McLaren and Lohr both retired in the following year. The new officers appointed to replace them proved unsatisfactory, and in 1906, "Ethel" Winifred Austin took up the new combined post of Secretary and Librarian. Austin proved to lead arguably the most eventful of the library's history. Despite postage rates for embossed volumes for the blind being reduced by the Postmaster General in 1906, financial problems continued, and after World War I began, it became very difficult to retain staff.

The premises at 125 Queen's Road Bayswater was gradually taken over and, by 1915, the last space in the cellar had been filled with shelving. The former premises of the Royal Architectural Museum, owned by the Architectural Association, in Tufton Street, Westminster were then acquired and remodelled, and the library moved into its new headquarters in 1916.

In 1916 it was not only rehoused; it was declared free for all blind readers. Its change of name to the National Library for the Blind was approved by the Board of Trade, and it obtained exemption from the payment of rates under the Scientific and Literary Societies Act 1843. Lord Shaw of Dunfermline, Chairman of the Carnegie United Kingdom Trust, became Chairman of the Library, and H. J. Wilson became vice-chairman, Secretary of Gardener's Trust for the Blind.

Ethel Austin's earliest proposals of 1911 for the amalgamation of small libraries for the blind into one centralised system proved abortive. She gave talks at national conferences and from 1913 she wrote regularly for Librarian and Book World. By 1917, the Braille collections of the Home Teaching Society, the Girls Friendly Society and the Catholic Truth Society had been taken over. During the same year, the Library of the Manchester and Salford Blind Aid Society was presented to the National Library for the Blind and incorporated into NLB as its Northern Branch.

=== The inter-war period ===
By 1918, the annual expenditure of the Library had risen to £6,000 and the annual circulation of volumes to nearly 100,000. Approximately eighty public libraries were receiving regular consignments of books, and the first foreign readers were in contact with the Library.

Premises were found in Manchester — in the shape of a forty-year-old fancy goods warehouse — and these were purchased and adapted.

The rebuilding of the Tufton Street portion of the Westminster premises was undertaken in 1935, reflecting a more healthy financial position. The Northern Branch proposal of the same period to move into premises on the fourth floor of the then newly completed Manchester Central Library came to nothing.

=== World War II ===
The Library's experience between 1939 and 1945 did not differ significantly from that of other large organisations with buildings in vulnerable areas. The London Headquarters and the Northern Branch buildings both suffered damage through enemy action; the damage in Manchester proved the most severe. The Headquarters basement became a 'day and night' public shelter and a 'roof spotter' watched over the safety of the building.

Many members of staff were drafted into the Services and other war-time duties, and replacements were difficult to find. However, the service continued throughout the war years, albeit with severe restrictions in the supply of books to readers overseas. The annual issue of volumes which had reached 350,000 by 1938/39 fell only to 320,000 in 1943/44 and to 311,000 in 1945/46, after which it began again to increase again.

=== Post-war ===
During this period, the Library's financial basis was modified and improved and the Library was re-structured. New Articles of Association were written, and a Council instituted as the governing body. Following the report of an Advisory Committee of the Library Association appointed in 1952, the new post of Librarian and Director-General was created.

In 1952, Queen Elizabeth II became Patron of the Library.

In 1958, work was completed to reconstruct the Northern Branch building to enable it to function effectively as an efficient modern library. The Library's methods were revised and brought up to date.

=== The move to Stockport ===
After a period of relative prosperity, the Library again hit financial problems in the early to mid-1970s as spiralling inflation overtook a fairly static income. As considerable cost savings could be made by combining the Westminster and Manchester operations, it was decided to concentrate operations on one site.

On grounds of cost, it was decided the new building should be in the Greater Manchester area. Building a new purpose-built Library was considered but, it was decided that a modern building suitable for conversion should first be sought.

A thorough search for suitable buildings was made across Greater Manchester during 1975 and 1976. The Library's essential needs were for warehouse space suitable for conversion into a book-stack providing 20,000 metres of easily accessible shelving and a large circulation and dispatch department, with offices immediately adjoining, all preferably on one floor. A suitable building was found at Bredbury in Stockport. This was approximately ten years old when found and had been the regional headquarters of Armitage Shanks, who no longer required it.

The staff and resources of the Northern Branch moved in during January 1978 and those of the Head Office during the following February and March. The move freed up resources, reduced costs and increased efficiency as all the Library's book-stock was now shelved under one roof.

== Final years ==
The 1980s and 1990s saw the computerisation of braille production and stock management leading to a more efficient operation. NLB diversified into electronic library services, Giant Print books and other services for visually impaired readers.

Membership of NLB continued to be free. The Library's lending stock came to total around 46,000 titles in braille, braille music, Moon type and large print formats. Typically 170,000 volumes were issued per year, posted out across the UK and overseas.

NLB's last chairman was Gillian A. Burrington, OBE and its final Chief Executive was Helen Brazier.

== Current status ==
The library services of NLB and RNIB were merged on 1 January 2007 to form the RNIB National Library Service. The merged service is part of RNIB and incorporates all the library services formerly provided by the two organisations. NLB continues to exist only as a 'shell charity' for the purposes of receiving donations and legacies.

In November 2012, NLB's Bredbury site was closed and its braille, giant print and Moon books and braille sheet music collections were re-located to the RNIB's Peterborough site.

Some former NLB staff were re-located to an office in Stockport town centre where they continue to provide advice and support to readers. The building at Far Cromwell Road, Bredbury, was sold in late 2012 to an online retailer to serve as their office/warehouse facility.
