= Royal Architectural Museum =

The Royal Architectural Museum was an English museum, established in London in 1851 to educate architects and workers on architectural art. It closed during World War I, and most of its collections are now held in the Victoria and Albert Museum.

== History ==
The museum, initially known as the Architectural Museum, was founded by architects George Gilbert Scott, Sir Charles Barry and George Godwin. Prince Albert was a patron, Thomas Philip de Grey, 2nd Earl de Grey, was its first president and Alexander Beresford-Hope was a trustee. The museum was also backed by John Ruskin.

Its initial collections included plaster casts of European gothic architectural ornamentations, decorative ironwork, tiles, woodcarving, sculptural stonework and stained glass, plus architectural models, plans and drawings.

From 1852 to 1854, the museum was housed in a loft in Canon Row, Westminster, where it also incorporated a School for Art-workmen. In 1857, it moved to South Kensington (where it occupied the upper floor of one of the so-called 'Brompton Boilers' at the modern day V&A Museum); in 1869 it moved again, to new purpose-built premises (designed by Ewan Christian and Joseph Clarke) at 18–20, Bowling Street, Westminster; the street, located behind the Dean's Yard at Westminster Abbey, was renamed Tufton Street in 1870. The basic structural frame of the new building – six iron supports spanning fifty feet each – came from the 1862 International Exhibition building, donated by the building firm Lucas Brothers. Upon its reopening its royal patronage was renewed by Queen Victoria and it became the Royal Architectural Museum.

A school of architectural art was established at the museum. This was initially jointly managed by the museum, the Architectural Association and the Royal Institute of British Architects, but by 1873 the school was solely managed by the museum, and it later changed its name to become the Westminster School of Art (later, in 1904, merging with the Westminster Technical Institute – today part of Westminster Kingsway College).

In 1904, the museum was wound up, with the building and contents gifted to the AA who maintained its administrative, legal and curatorial functions. For some years, the AA School was co-located in the Westminster premises, but by 1915 these were regarded as too small. The building was sold to the National Lending Library for the Blind and was demolished and consequently rebuilt in 1935. Most of the museum's collections ended up in the Victoria and Albert Museum.
