= 2/1st London Brigade =

- Active: 29 December 1914 – June 1916
- Country: United Kingdom
- Branch: Territorial Force
- Type: Infantry
- Size: Brigade
- Garrison/HQ: London
- Engagements: World War I

The 2/1st London Brigade was a 2nd Line formation of the Territorial Force of the British Army. It was formed at the start of World War I and served in overseas garrisons in Malta and Egypt. Although it never saw action as a formation, its constituent battalions fought at Gallipoli and served against the Senussi tribesmen. The brigade was then sent to the Western Front where it was broken up to provide drafts for 1st Line units.

== Origin ==
When the Territorial Force (TF) was created in 1908, the 1st London Brigade in 1st London Division comprised the first four battalions of the new London Regiment, each of which had previously been a Volunteer battalion of the Royal Fusiliers (the City of London Regiment). When World War I broke out in 1914, the 1st London Brigade was the first complete TF formation to go overseas on service, relieving the Regular Army garrison of Malta in September. Each battalion left behind a cadre of officers and men (mainly those who were unfit or who had not volunteered for overseas service) to organise a 2nd Line battalion from the mass of volunteers who were coming forward. These units were distinguished from the 1st line by a '2/' prefix, so that the 2/1st London Brigade consisting of the 2/1st, 2/2nd etc battalions of the London Regiment was created in the 2/1st London Division. Initially, the 2nd Line was regarded as a reserve for the TF overseas, but its units were soon being prepared for overseas service themselves.

== Order of battle ==
The brigade was constituted as follows:

- 2/1st (City of London) Battalion, London Regiment (Royal Fusiliers) – formed at Handel Street, Bloomsbury
- 2/2nd (City of London) Battalion, London Regiment (Royal Fusiliers) – formed at Tufton Street, Westminster
- 2/3rd (City of London) Battalion, London Regiment (Royal Fusiliers) – formed at Edward Street, Hampstead Road, St Pancras
- 2/4th (City of London) Battalion, London Regiment (Royal Fusiliers) – formed at Shaftesbury Street, City Road, Hoxton

== Basic training ==
A serious shortage of equipment hampered the training of the 2nd Line TF units and formations – at first 'wooden equivalents' had to be employed in place of rifles, later some .256-in Japanese Ariska rifles became available. 2/2nd Londons trained in Vincent Square, close to its Tufton St HQ, but this was too cramped and it soon moved to Tattenham Corner railway station to train on Epsom Downs. 2/3rd Londons also went to Epsom Downs, while 2/4th Bn moved from Hoxton to New Barnet. Despite the difficulties, the battalions were quickly recruited up to full strength, and in mid-December the whole of 2/1st London Brigade assembled around Maidstone.

== Malta ==
From Maidstone the brigade was ordered to Malta at short notice to relieve the 1/1st London Bde for service on the Western Front. The 2/2nd, 2/3rd and 2/4th battalions disembarked on 31 December, and their 1st Line equivalents departed on 2 January 1915, leaving behind for the newcomers their obsolete Long Lee-Enfield rifles and Vickers-Maxim machine guns and the unfit personnel. The 2/1st Londons only reached Malta on 11 February 1915.

While on Malta the Brigade continued training, maintained coastal patrols, guarded Prisoners of war, caught possible spies, and performed public duties. In April 1915, the 2/3rd Londons left Malta for Egypt, landing at Port Said and going to garrison Khartoum in the Anglo-Egyptian Sudan. The battalions in Malta were still regarded as draft-finding units for the 1/1st Brigade, but in July they were ordered to prepare to go to Egypt as Service Battalions. The Brigade HQ and battalions arrived at Alexandria aboard various ships between 25 and 31 August.

== Gallipoli ==
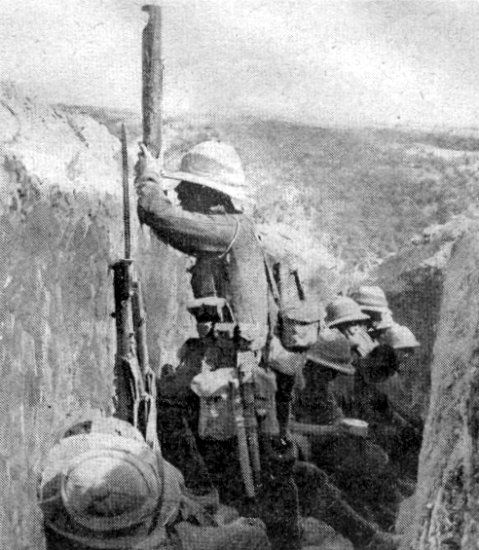
Trench warfare at Cape Helles

The brigade, including 2/3rd Londons returned from Khartoum, assembled at Abbassia Camp in Cairo and prepared to reinforce the Mediterranean Expeditionary Force fighting at Gallipoli. However, the brigade did not proceed as a complete formation, the battalions proceeding individually. The 2/1st and 2/3rd Battalions were the first to go, in September, being sent via Mudros to reinforce the Regulars of the 29th Division. The 2/3rd Londons landed at Suvla Bay on 23 September and were attached to 88th Bde in the 'Dublin Castle' Sector for training, with A Company attached to the 2nd Bn Royal Fusiliers. 2/1st Londons landed at W Beach, Suvla, about midnight on 24 September, and were attached to 88th Brigade. On arrival they were re-armed with modern Short Lee-Enfield rifles (other battalions of the brigade retained their obsolete Long Lee-Enfields) and then moved forward to the Brigade Reserve Area. The battalion was attached to the 1st Bn Essex Regiment for training. After training in trench warfare the two battalions began tours of duty in the front line; the 2/1st Bn alternated with the Newfoundland Regiment on a weekly rotation at Essex Ravine.

The rest of the brigade remained in Egypt until October, when they were sent to Gallipoli to reinforce the Royal Naval Division. 2/2nd Londons sailed on 5 October, then remained in Mudros harbour until 13 October when they transhipped to HMT Sarnia and landed at W Beach at Cape Helles. They were followed by the 2/4th Battalion, which embarked on 9 October, transhipped at Mudros to the Sarnia and landed on 16 October. 2/2nd Battalion was attached to the 2nd Royal Naval Brigade, and Officers and NCOs went up to the line for instruction by 1st and 2nd Royal Marine Light Infantry. Two companies then went into the front line and two into the reserve positions (the Eski Line) on 17 October. The 2/2nd were relieved by the 2/4th Londons on 20 October, after which the two battalions began a rotation with one week in the line alternating with a week's 'rest' in flooded camps in the rear as part of 1st Royal Naval Brigade.

The battalions took no part in offensive operations, but on 15 November the machine gun section of the 2/2nd Londons (four old Vickers-Maxims and two even older Nordenfelt guns), together with rifle fire and bombs, provided flanking fire in support of a limited attack by 52nd (Lowland) Division.

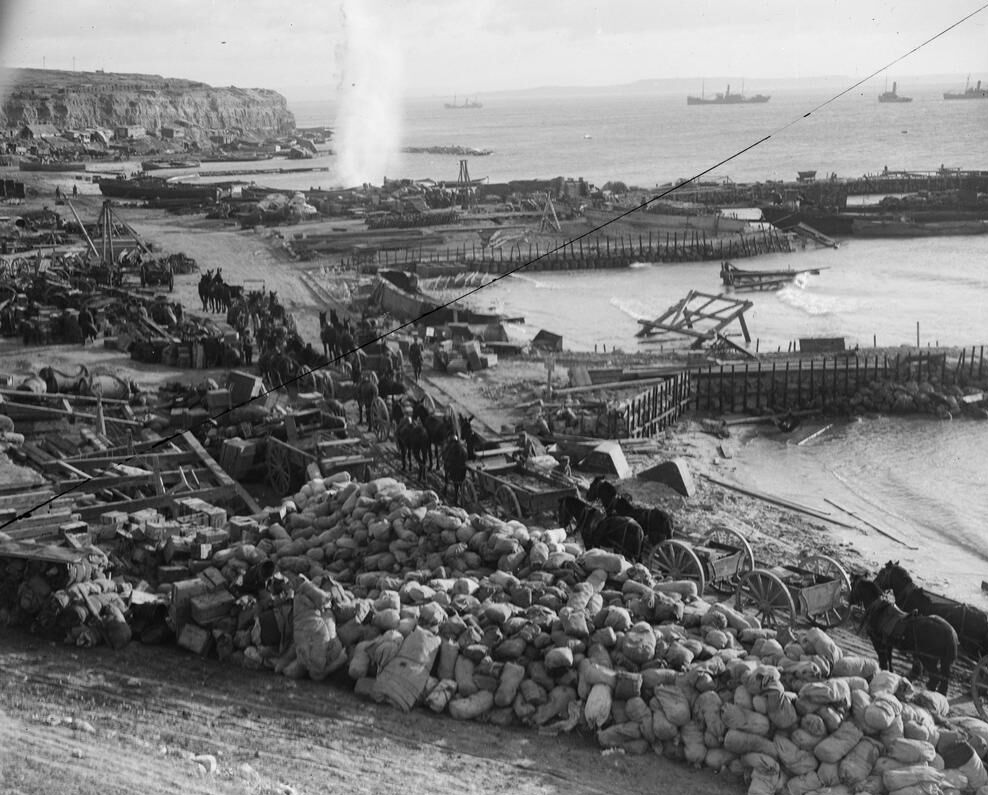
W Beach at Cape Helles, just prior to the evacuation

By the end of November the four battalions had each suffered heavy casualties, some from enemy action, but the greater number from sickness and frostbite.

In December the Gallipoli operation began to be shut down. The 29th Division was relocated from Suvla Bay to Cape Helles. The 2/3rd Bn was pulled out of the line on 12 December and after a short rest at Mudros landed at Helles on 16 December. It was followed by 2/1st Bn, which was withdrawn to Mudros on 18 December and landed at V Beach on 26 December. Both battalions provided working parties for Gully Beach and the Eski Line. All four battalions were then evacuated from Helles in detachments between 31 December and 8 January 1916. They were then shipped from Mudros to Alexandria.

== Senussi campaign ==
On return to Egypt, the 2/1st London Bde was attached to the 53rd (Welsh) Division, the two battalions from the 29th Division on 15 January, the two from the RN Division on 22 February. The 2/4th Bn and two companies of the 2/2nd Bn were then sent to join a force at Minia guarding the Nile against a potential attack by Senussi rebels. The 2/4th Londons' CO (Acting-Lt-Col V.H. Seyd, then Col Vickers Dunfee) commanded a force consisting of the Londons with detachments of Lovat's Scouts, Australian Light Horse, Royal Engineers and an armoured train. The remainder of 2/2nd Londons acted as HQ companies for 'Southern Force' protecting the southern Nile Valley.

The detachments were withdrawn in April 1916 and returned to Alexandria, where the 2/1st London Brigade concentrated under the command of Col Dunfee. Here the 2/2nd finally received Short Lee-Enfields to replace their old long pattern rifles. On 17 April the whole brigade embarked on HMT Transylvania and sailed to Marseille, disembarking on 24 April.

== Disbandment ==
Once in France, the 2/1st London Brigade moved to Rouen, where it was disbanded and the four battalions broken up for drafting as reinforcements to other units For example, from 5 May the 2/2nd sent large drafts to the 1/2nd, and also to the 1/12th Londons (The Rangers) and the 1/16th Londons (Queen's Westminsters). By 20 June all of the 2/4th Bn had been drafted to the 1/4th Bn. All of these battalions were in the 56th (1/1st London) Division preparing for the Attack on the Gommecourt Salient that opened the Battle of the Somme.

Meanwhile, the units of the 173rd (3/1st London) Brigade, training in the United Kingdom, were renumbered as the 'New' 2/1st, 2/2nd etc Bns. The brigade had already taken 2/1st London Bde's place in 58th (2/1st London) Division. At the time, the 58th Division was carrying out coast defence duties in East Anglia, but in July 1916 it began battle training on Salisbury Plain and in January 1917 it landed in France, where it fought on the Western Front until the Armistice with Germany in November 1918.

== Commanders ==
Among the brigade's commander were the following officers:

- Col E. FitzG. M. Wood from 29 December 1914 until February 1915
- Col Vickers Dunfee from April 1916 to disbandment.
