= 1st (City of London) Battalion, London Regiment (Royal Fusiliers) =

British volunteer military unit from 1859 to 1967

19th (Bloomsbury) Middlesex RVC 1st Volunteer Bn, Royal Fusiliers 1st Bn, London Regiment 8th Bn, Royal Fusiliers City of London Bn, Royal Fusiliers
- Active: 13 December 1859–1 April 1967
- Country: United Kingdom
- Branch: Volunteer Force/Territorial Force/Territorial Army
- Type: Infantry Battalion
- Role: Infantry
- Size: 1–4 Battalions
- Part of: London Regiment; Royal Fusiliers
- Garrison/HQ: 101 St Martin's Lane; 33 Fitzroy Square; Handel Street, Bloomsbury
- Nickname: 'Tom Brown's Corps'
- Mascot: A duck (1943–45)
- Engagements: Second Boer War; World War I: Western Front; Gallipoli; World War II; Tunisia; Italy

Commanders
- Notable commanders: Thomas Hughes

The 1st (City of London) Battalion, London Regiment (Royal Fusiliers) was a volunteer unit of the British Army under various titles from its foundation in 1859 in Bloomsbury, London, by the author of Tom Brown's Schooldays. It served in Malta, Gallipoli, Egypt and on the Western Front during World War I. In World War II it served in Iraq, North Africa and Italy. It amalgamated with other Territorial units of the Royal Fusiliers in the 1960s.

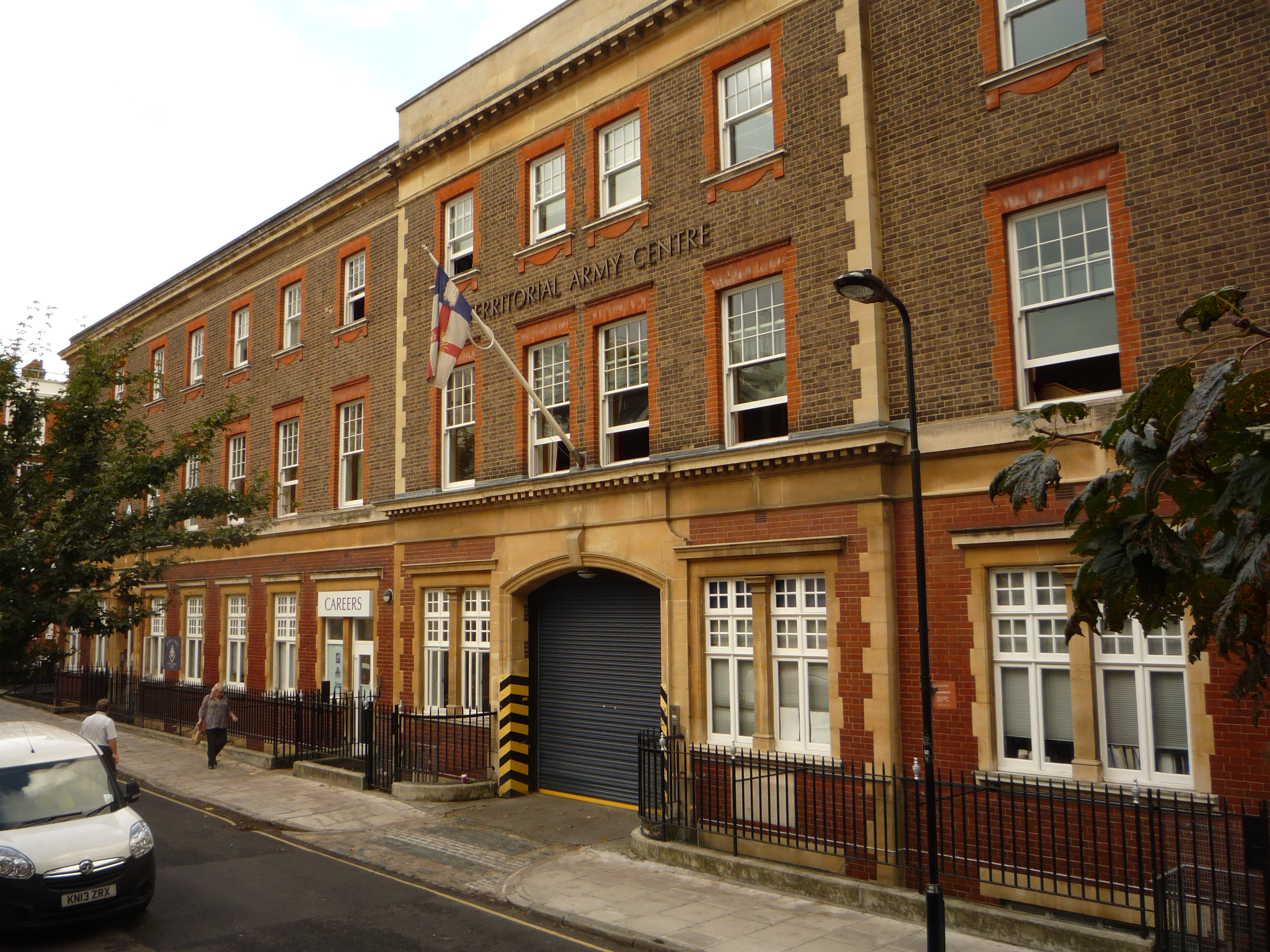
The battalion's HQ and drill hall at Handel Street, Bloomsbury

== Volunteer Force ==
The enthusiasm for the Volunteer movement following an invasion scare in 1859 saw the creation of many Rifle Volunteer Corps (RVCs) composed of part-time soldiers eager to supplement the Regular British Army in time of need. One such unit was the Working Men's College Rifle Volunteers raised by Thomas Hughes, author of Tom Brown's Schooldays. It was accepted and numbered as the 19th (Bloomsbury) Middlesex Rifle Volunteer Corps on 13 December 1859. The recruits for the first three of 10 companies were drawn from pupils of the Christian Socialist Working Men's College in Bloomsbury where Hughes was a lecturer, later joined by others from Paddington Green Working Men's College and the St John's Institute in Cleveland Street and by artisans, clerks, warehousemen and shipmen from the Price's Candles' Belmont works in Battersea and the Westminster parishes of St Luke and St Anne. Hughes calculated that it was the poorest RVC in London, where volunteers tended to be middle class. Hughes was a leading proponent of the Volunteer Movement, serving as deputy editor of the Volunteer Service Gazette.

The unit's Honorary Chaplain, appointed on 7 December 1860, was the Rev Frederick Denison Maurice, a leading Christian Socialist and one of the founders of the Working Men's College. By 1866 the battalion's headquarters (HQ) was at 101 St Martin's Lane. It later moved to 33 Fitzroy Square. Thomas Hughes retired from the command and was appointed the unit's first Honorary Colonel on 26 May 1869, when Lt-Col John Stewart Oxley succeeded to the command. In 1869 the 37th (St Giles's and St George's Bloomsbury Rifles) Middlesex RVC petitioned to be the sole RVC with 'Bloomsbury' in its title. This was agreed and the 19th had to drop 'Bloomsbury' from its title.

When the Cardwell Reforms introduced 'Localisation of the Forces' in 1873, the 19th Middlesex was brigaded, together with several other London and Middlesex Volunteer and Militia battalions, in Brigade Nos 51 & 52 under the 60th Rifles. In 1880, following consolidations among less successful corps, the 19th Middlesex became the 10th Middlesex RVC. (Note: Confusingly the 37th (Bloomsbury Rifles) now took over the 19th place.)

The Childers Reforms of 1881 took Cardwell's reforms further, with the RVCs becoming volunteer battalions (VBs) of their affiliated regiment. Hence the 10th Middlesex became a VB of the King's Royal Rifle Corps (as the 60th Rifles had become) without changing its title. However, in July 1883 the unit's affiliation was changed, and it became the 1st Volunteer Battalion, Royal Fusiliers (City of London Regiment).

The Stanhope Memorandum of December 1888 proposed a comprehensive Mobilisation Scheme for Volunteer units, which would assemble in their own brigades at key points in case of war. In peacetime these brigades provided a structure for collective training. The battalion formed part of the West London Brigade, together with other VBs of the Royal Fusiliers and Middlesex Regiment, whose place of assembly was Caterham Barracks. It was redesignated 1st London Brigade in 1902, but the VBs of the Royal Fusiliers were moved to a new Royal Fusiliers Brigade in 1906.

=== Second Boer War ===
After Black Week in December 1899, the Volunteers were invited to send active service units to assist the Regulars in the Second Boer War. The War Office decided that one company 116 strong could be recruited from the volunteer battalions of any infantry regiment that had a regular battalion serving in South Africa. A composite Service Company drawn from the 1st, 2nd and 3rd VBs Royal Fusiliers joined the 2nd Royal Fusiliers on 7 May 1900 at Fourteen Springs. G Company of the City of London Imperial Volunteers (CIV) was also formed from the three Royal Fusiliers VBs. The CIV returned to London when the war seemed over in 1900, but the service company continued with the regulars during the guerrilla phase of the war. This involved long marches, including the 'Great De Wet Hunt', and then tedious garrison duty in the blockhouse lines. A second composite company joined the 2nd Royal Fusiliers on 22 July 1901, and a third on 1 April 1902. The battalion was awarded the Battle honour South Africa 1900–1902.

== Territorial Force ==
When the Volunteer Force was subsumed into the new Territorial Force (TF) under the Haldane Reforms of 1908, the Volunteer units in and around London were formed into a new London Regiment, with the 1st VB of the Royal Fusiliers becoming the 1st (City of London) Battalion, the London Regiment (Royal Fusiliers), conveniently shortened to '1st Londons'. The 1st–4th Bns London Regiment (formerly the 1st–4th VBs Royal Fusiliers) remained brigaded together as 1st London Brigade of the 1st London Division of the TF.

In 1913 the TF Association built a new HQ and drill hall in Handel Street, Bloomsbury, which the battalion shared with the 1st City of London Brigade Royal Field Artillery. (Note: The two parts of the building were later known as 'Fusilier Hall' and 'Artillery Hall'; it is now nown as 'Yeomanry House'.) Battalion HQ and six of the eight companies were based at Handel Street, while D and E Companies were at 15 Battersea Square.

== World War I ==
=== Mobilisation ===
The 1st London Division left by train from Waterloo Station on Sunday 2 August 1914 for its annual training camp, which was to be held at Wareham, Dorset. No sooner had the battalions reached camp than they received orders to return to London for mobilisation. This process had been carefully planned, and was completed on 3 August, so that before war was declared on 4 August the battalions of the 1st London Brigade were already at their war stations, guarding the vital London and South Western Railway line between Waterloo and Southampton Docks. The 1st Londons had mobilised at Handel Street under the command of Colonel P.B.G.O. Crowe, VD, commanding officer (CO) since 3 March 1907.

The TF was intended to be a home defence force for service during wartime and members could not be compelled to serve outside the country. However, on 10 August 1914 TF units were invited to volunteer for overseas service and the majority did so. On the night of 31 August/1 September the 1st London Bde was ordered back to its peacetime headquarters to mobilise for garrison duty overseas.

The 1st London Brigade was the first complete TF formation to go overseas on service, to relieve the Regular Army garrison of Malta. Each battalion left behind a cadre of officers and men (mainly those who were unfit or who had not volunteered for overseas service) to organise a 2nd Line battalion from the mass of volunteers who were coming forward. These units were distinguished from the 1st line by a '2/' prefix, so that the 2/1st London Brigade consisting of the 2/1st, 2/2nd etc battalions of the London Regiment was created in the 2/1st London Division. Initially, the 2nd Line was regarded as a reserve for the TF overseas, but its units were soon being prepared for overseas service themselves and a 3rd Line was formed as a reserve to provide drafts for the 1/1st and 2/1st. Later a 4/1st Battalion was also raised (see below).

=== 1/1st Londons ===
==== Malta ====
The 1/1st London Bde sailed from Southampton Docks on 4 September and disembarked in Malta on 14 September to begin guard duties on the island. Training began as the summer temperatures cooled. 1/1st Londons were stationed at St Andrews Barracks, and two companies at a time of other battalions were attached to it for musketry instruction at the nearby Pembroke Ranges under a sergeant-instructor of the Royal Marine Light Infantry. On 22 December 1/1st London Bde received a warning order to prepare to leave the island. In January 1915 the brigade was relieved by the 2/1st London Bde (leaving behind its obsolete rifles and equipment for the newcomers) and the 1/2nd, 1/3rd and 1/4th Londons left for France. However, 1/1st Londons was retained on the island to 'stiffen' the raw new battalions. It was not until 11 February that the 1/1st sailed, bound for Avonmouth in England, where it arrived on 21 February. On 11 March it landed at Le Havre in France to join the British Expeditionary Force (BEF) on the Western Front. On 14 March it joined 25th Brigade, alongside the 1/13th Londons (Kensingtons), which had been in France since November 1914. The brigade formed part of the Regular 8th Division. 8th Division had just come out of the costly Battle of Neuve Chapelle when the battalion joined, and the additional manpower was welcome.

==== Western Front ====
The 8th Division attacked again at the Battle of Aubers Ridge on 9 May, against the enemy lines in front of Fromelles. However, the inexperienced 1/1st Londons were not committed to the assault, which resulted in the attacking battalions gaining a lodgement in the enemy trenches but being unable to get any further nor were their brigades able to reinforce them across the fire-swept No man's land. The offensive was broken off that night. The Kensingtons had suffered such severe casualties that they were withdrawn from the front line to line of communication duties, with 1/1st Londons effectively replacing them as the TF extra battalion in 25th Bde. The battalion spent the summer learning the skills of Trench warfare.

On 25 September 8th Division carried out a subsidiary attack as a diversion from the Battle of Loos beginning that day. Termed the Action of Bois-Grenier this involved 25th Bde attacking the opposing trenches between 'Corner Fort' and 'Bridoux Fort' with the aim of breaking through and linking hands with the Indian Corps on Aubers Ridge. Once again, 1/1st Londons remained in support of the assaulting battalions, and once again a lodgement was obtained but the supporting troops were unable to cross No man's land with reinforcements and ammunition. The attack was called off during the afternoon, but the division had taken the opportunity to dig a new trench that was completed that night, shortening and strengthening the British front line.

8th Division was not engaged in any further major actions in 1915. In February 1916 the 1st London Division began to re-assemble in France as the 56th (1st London) Division. 1/1st Londons joined 167th (1st London) Brigade at Hallencourt on 8 February, the brigade now consisting of 1/1st and 1/3rd Londons, together with 1/7th and 1/8th Bns, Middlesex Regiment. The battalions making up the reformed division were reorganised to produce the specialist Lewis gun teams, 'bombing' squads etc required by current tactical doctrine, and had to supply men to the new brigade machine gun companies and trench mortar batteries that were being formed. All these specialists underwent intensive training around Le Cauroy, where the division moved in mid-March.

Following its losses from casualties in the previous months of trench warfare, and of men transferred to specialist units, the 1/1st Londons, now under the command of Lt-Col Duncan Smith (one of the battalion's pre-war captains), were brought back up to strength in May when the battalion absorbed the 2/1st Londons, just returned from Egypt (see below).

==== Gommecourt ====
On 4 May 167th Bde moved to Hébuterne, later joined by the rest of the division, which began preparing for its role it in that summer's 'Big Push' (the Battle of the Somme). The brigade took over the frontline trenches, 1/1st Londons and 1/7th Middlesex using Sailly-au-Bois as their base and alternating tours of duty with the other two battalions of the brigade. Each battalion manned the line with two companies, keeping the other two in support. The trenches were on the right of the Gommecourt Salient, some 700 yards (640 m) away from the German positions. For the coming attack the division needed a jumping-off trench much closer to the enemy, so after it was relieved on 22 May 167th Bde practised the operation. Each battalion was responsible for one sector, that for 1/1st Londons (Sector A) running between the two roads from Hébuterne to Puisieux and to Bucquoy. On the first night (25/25 May) covering parties kept No man's land clear of enemy patrols while the sappers and taping parties marked the trenches to be dug. Carts full of empty biscuit tins were driven up and down the streets of Hébuterne to mask the sound of the work, and the artillery stood by to fire protective barrages if the enemy intervened. The work did not go smoothly in A Sector, where the men had to cope with uncut British barbed wire, clogged communication trenches, and active German patrols, and the marking was not completed by daybreak. The bulk of the work was to be carried out in one night, 26/27 May, by the infantry working parties and carrying parties. This time 1/1st Londons were able to finish before dawn, leaving small parties to hold the shallow new trench. The work was deepened and finished off with support lines and communication trenches the following night, but 1/1st Londons suffered around 34 casualties.

After its efforts 167th Bde went into divisional reserve, but the labour did not end. 1/1st and 1/3rd Londons shared the village of St Armand as a base, from which they sent out daily working parties for road repair and preparing dumps. Casualties were light but the intense work throughout June left the battalion exhausted. 167th Brigade held the line in late June while the rest of the division practised the assault they were to make on Z Day (which was delayed by weather to 1 July). The preliminary bombardment began on U Day (24 June), and from 25 June the units holding the line were subject to German counter-preparation shellfire. They were also standing knee-deep in flooded trenches and 'trench foot' was common. On 29 June a patrol of 1/1st Londons reported that the Germans had erected additional wire in front of their positions. Early on the morning of 1 July half of 167th Bde including 1/1st Londons withdrew while the assaulting brigades took up their positions in the new jumping-off trench. 56th (1st L ) Division's Attack on the Gommecourt Salient initially went well, but once again the leading waves were cut off in the captured trenches by the weight of German fire falling on the former No man's land behind them (which was still wide, despite the new jumping-off trench). A gap appeared between the two leading battalions of 168th (2nd London) Bde and 1/1st Londons were ordered up with the hope that it could link them up, but their positions were untenable and 1/1st Londons were kept in their reserve trench. The divisional commander was ordered to renew the attack after dark with his two reserve battalions, including 1/1st Londons, but the lodgement the division had gained was lost before nightfall. That night 167th Bde relieved the shattered 168th Bde in the front line. Despite not having attacked, 1/1st Londons had still suffered 81 casualties during the First day of the Somme.

==== Somme ====
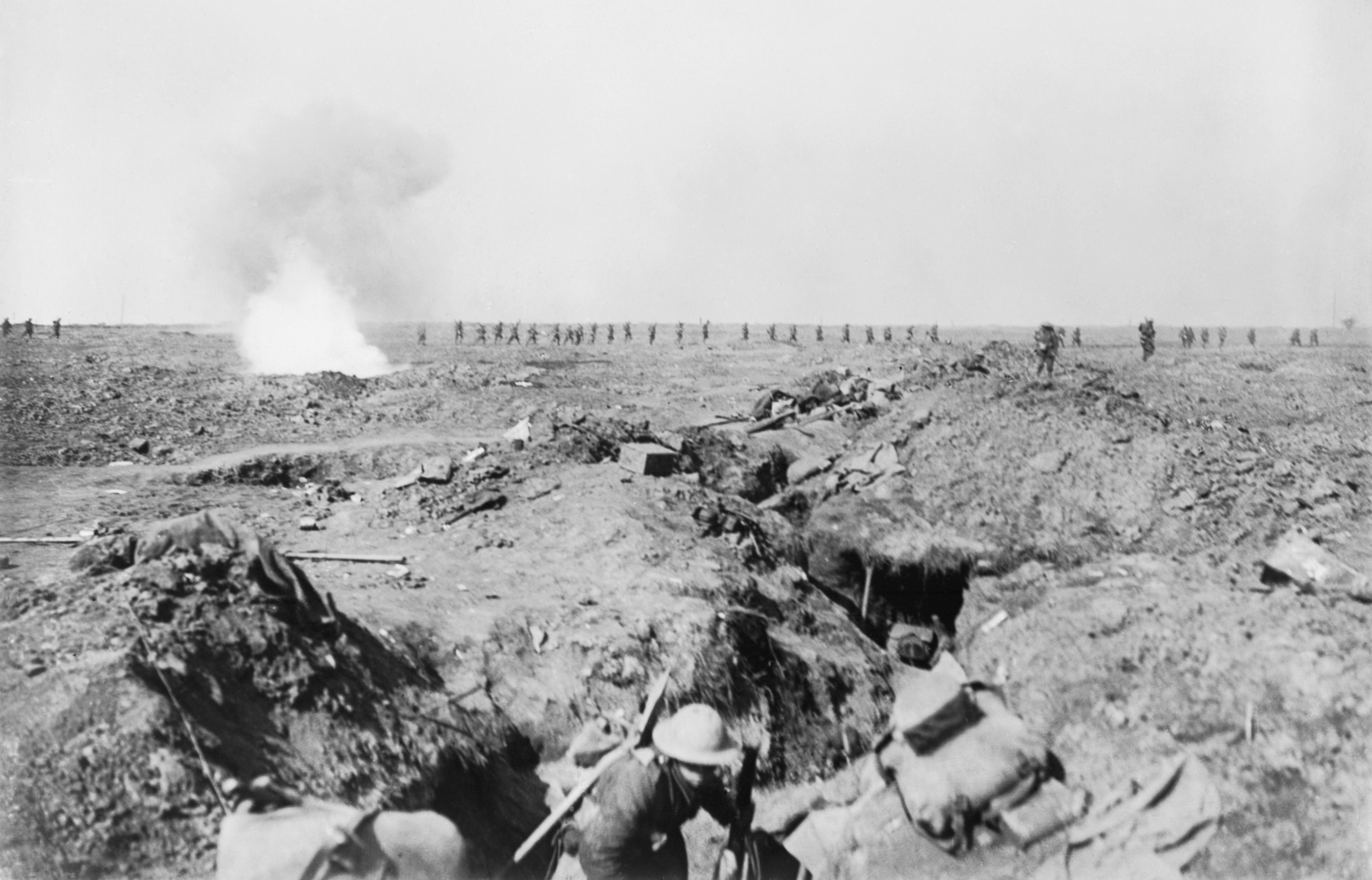
British troops advancing during the Battle of Ginchy

The Gommecourt attack had been a diversion and no further attack was made in the area. The reduced battalions of 56th (1st L) Division had to hold their line until 20 August while the Somme offensive continued further south. After being relieved, the division moved to the Abbeville area, where it trained with the first tanks to arrive in France.

56th (1st L) Division was warned on 31 August of a move back into the line, and 167th Bde set off in two trains on 4 September. The division carried out a relief during the night of 6/7 September and took over the trenches between Guillemont and the French army, with 167th Bde in divisional reserve, ready to launch the next phase of the offensive (the Battle of Ginchy) on 9 September. 168th Brigade attacked before dawn with partial success, but lost direction, and this caused some problems for their relief later in the day by 167th Bde.

For the much bigger Battle of Flers–Courcelette on 15 September, 167th Bde attacked towards Bouleaux Wood with two of the new tanks in support. The attack went in at 06.20 with 1/1st London leading, but one tank had broken down, while the other was hit by a field gun and set on fire after giving early support. The Creeping barrage was ineffective. The battalion took the enemy trenches outside and to the right of the wood, but there its attack was brought to a standstill with heavy casualties. Two companies of 1/7th Middlesex passed through at 08.20 to continue the attack, carrying many of the 1/1st Londons forward with them, but the wood was strongly held and they were almost wiped out. The other two companies reinforced 1/1st Londons in the captured trench, Brigade HQ sent up 1/8th Middlesex to renew the attack, but neighbouring troops had not taken the flanking strongpoint known as 'the Quadrilateral' and the attack was another failure. The division's attacks were called off in the afternoon as the fighting settled into a series of 'bombing' attacks by both sides, 1/1st Londons and 1/7th Middlesex taking 'Middle Copse'.

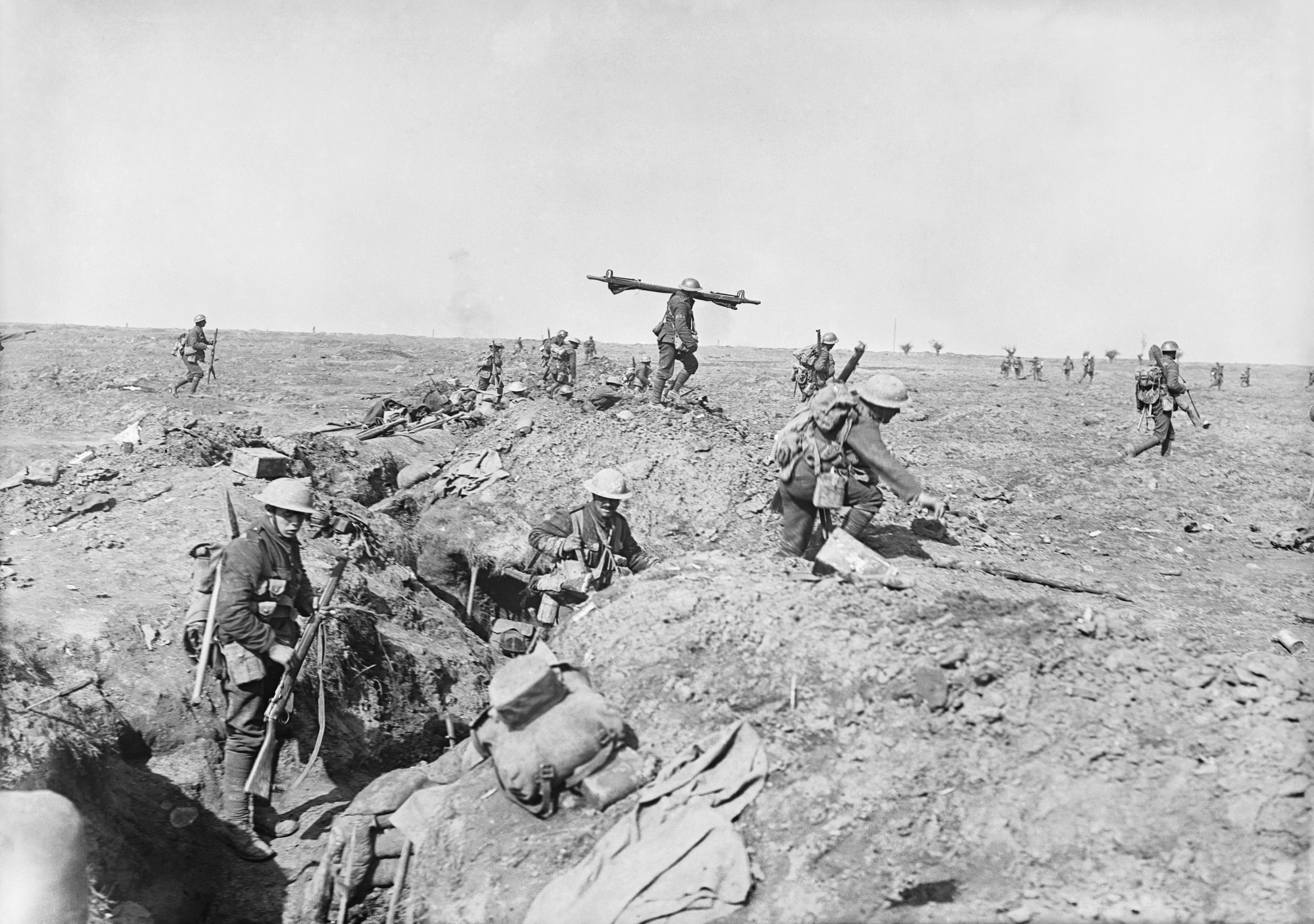
British troops at Morval 25 September 1916

When 167th Brigade attacked again on 18 September it had to use battalions borrowed from other brigades. It was relieved next day, and some reinforcements were received before it returned to the line on 22 September. When the division attacked again on 25 September (the Battle of Morval), it followed a creeping barrage and Bouleaux Wood had been given special attention by the artillery. 1/1st Londons was holding the line from Leuze Wood and Middle Copse, and when German resistance began to crumble it was able to push patrols forwards. By midnight 167th Bde was in the lower part of Bouleaux Wood and beyond the derelict tank from the 15 September fighting. Next morning 1/1st Londons pushed in to Capture Combles.

In early October 167th Bde occupied a line of linked-up outposts in a sea of mud, and the planned attack on 5 October was postponed. It went in on 7 October (the Battle of Le Transloy), 1/1st London and 1/7th Middlesex leading again towards 'Spectrum Trench' about 400 yards (370 m) ahead of the outpost line. 1/1st London had no success except on the left where some of the bombers pushed on with 1/7th Middlesex into the trench. The brigade failed to make any appreciable advance against machine gun fire in the follow-up attack next day. The division was relieved the following night.

There followed months of light training and line-holding in the 'Moated Grange' area of the Neuve Chapelle sector while the units of 56th (1st L) Division were slowly rebuilt. Despite further casualties while holding the line and raiding the enemy, 1/1st Londons attained a strength of 1062 all ranks when it returned to active operations in March 1917.

==== Arras ====
In March 1917 56th (1st L) Division was preparing to attack as part of the forthcoming Battle of Arras when patrols discovered that the Germans in front had disappeared – the beginning of their retreat to the Hindenburg Line (Operation Alberich). At Arras this retreat was minor, so the attack went in on schedule on 9 April (the First Battle of the Scarpe), starting from old German communication trenches. 167th Brigade attacked with 1/3rd Londons and 1/8th Middlesex leading, 1/1st Londons in support, the objective being Neuville-Vitasse. 1/3rd Londons progressed well and reached their objective (the Blue Line) by 10.00; 1/8th Middlesex were more held up and did not reach the Blue Line until 16.00. However the delay did not affect 1/1st Londons, who passed through 1/3rd and bypassed this opposition. 1/1st Londons then advanced at 12.40 in two waves, the first intending to capture the front Hindenburg trench, the second to take the next two trenches (Neuville-Vitasse and Cojeul Switch respectively) and the sunken road between them. However, the battalion suffered heavy casualties including their CO Lt-Col Smith mortally wounded (Capt Eiloart took temporary command), and got held up in the Neuville-Vitasse trench and sunken road. 1/7th Middlesex, the reserve battalion, came up to help 1/1st Londons forward, but the troops were now badly bunched up and although together they took the first line of the Cojeul switch (Telegraph Hill Trench) it took until the end of the day to gain the final objective (Ibex Trench). Fighting in the Hindenburg Line with bomb and bayonet went on through the night, so 56th (1st L) Division's morning follow-up attack towards the final objective (the Brown Line) could not be delivered until 12.10. 1/1st Londons advanced in support. However, all it achieved was the clearance of more of the Hindenburg position and rounding up of prisoners. On 11 April, with the aid of four tanks, 167th Bde carried out a bombing operation down the Hindenburg Line into the Wancourt–Feuchy Line, which helped the neighbouring division. 167th Brigade was then ordered to take Hill 90 as soon as possible next day, but in fact the enemy abandoned it and Wancourt. Exhausted from fighting for four days in thick mud, the brigade was relieved and went to rest at Pommier.

56th (1st L) Division renewed its attacks on 3 May (the Third Battle of the Scarpe) with a pre-dawn assault. In the words of the Official History, 167th Bde 'never had a chance'. 1/1st Londons and 1/17th Middlesex led off towards 'Tool Trench'. As soon as they started the German defensive barrage came down on them. Tool Trench lay behind a crest and had hardly been touched by the British bombardment; contrary to usual practice the German defenders stood shoulder to shoulder in the trench and their burst of rifle fire completely smashed the attack. The small British parties who penetrated through the trench to 'Lanyard Lane' were rounded up and captured. Both battalions fell back: they would have had few survivors if the attack had been made in daylight. Many men remained in shellholes in No man's land sheltering from the repeated German barrages until the following night. The brigade was withdrawn on 5 May. It later returned to the line and there was much small-scale fighting until the division was relieved on 20 May.

==== Ypres ====
After Arras the BEF began preparing for the Third Ypres Offensive. During July 56th (1st L) division was in GHQ Reserve, undergoing training. On 6 August it was transferred to the Ypres Salient to take part in the second phase of the offensive (the Battle of Langemarck). The offensive was already bogged down in mud, and preparations were hindered by a German attack on 167th Bde's position two days before the battle. Attacking at 04.45 on 16 August, with 1/1st Londons and 1/8th Middlesex in front, 167th Bde soon found a marsh blocking its advance, which had to be avoided by 1/18th Middlesex edging to the left, pushing 1/1st Londons further left and opening a gap to 169th (3rd London) Brigade on the right. When 167th Bde ran into a second marsh it was held up, under flanking fire from the gap on the right. The rear waves of 1/1st Londons had been heavily shelled; they now became mixed with the leading waves. With 169th Bde falling back, 167th Bde went back a little and formed a defensive flank. A German counter-attack also failed in the mud. Prevented from making progress, the brigade withdrew to a more favourable position in the afternoon, having gained just 400 yards (370 m). 1/7th Middlesex relieved the other three battalions of the brigade that night, but its CO having been wounded it came under 1/1st Londons.

==== Cambrai ====
The casualties from the Ypres fighting were not replaced, and the whole division was numerically weak, so 56th (1st L) Division was sent to a quiet sector. It was given the task of making a demonstration with dummy tanks and figures on the flank of the great tank attack that opened the Battle of Cambrai on 20 November. The demonstration succeeded in attracting German defensive fire. 167th Brigade was not directly involved in 56th (1st L) Division's fighting to capture and hold Tadpole Copse and Bourlon Wood 21–27 November, at the end of which the division was holding a defensive flank. On the night of 29/30 November 167th Bde was relieved from the front line and went into reserve behind the other two brigades of 56th (1st L) Division. The German counter-offensive began the following morning, but was successfully held by the division, during which 1/8th Middlesex was heavily engaged while the rest of 167th Bde moved up from reserve and helped to dig defences. The battered division was relieved and sent to a quieter sector on 3 December; having been only lightly engaged in the battle, the 1/1st Londons still had 783 all ranks at its end.

Due to manpower shortages the BEF disbanded one in four of its infantry battalions in February 1918. 1/3rd Londons was selected for disbandment from 167th Bde: it supplied drafts to each of the remaining battalions in the brigade, the 1/1st Londons receiving 11 officers and 250 ORs. The 'New' 2/1st Londons in 58th (2/1st London) Division was also disbanded (see below) and thereafter 1/1st Londons was referred to simply as '1st Londons'. (Note: The HQ and transport of 2/1st Londons may have been absorbed by 1/1st Londons.)

==== Spring Offensive ====
56th (1st L) Division spent the winter of 1917–8 holding trenches in the Arleux–Oppy sector and training before going back to the Gavrelle sector in February. It was still there when the German spring offensive began on 21 March; although the division's lines were bombarded, the attack was launched further south. However, on 28 March the Germans widened their offensive by attacking up the valley of the River Scarpe, bringing on the Third Battle of Arras. 167th Brigade was in divisional reserve, with two companies of 1st Londons positioned behind 169th Bde. British fire took a heavy toll of the massed attackers as they went through Gavrelle, but they pushed up a shallow valley between 56th (1st L) Division and its neighbour on the right, forcing 169th Bde's flank back to its 'Battle Zone' (the Bailleul–Willerval Line). But there the German advance was held and the attackers suffered huge casualties. By 18.00 the situation had stabilised and the battalions of 167th Bde relieved those of 169th Bde. There were no further attacks next day, and on the night of 29/30 March the division was relieved, 167th Bde going back to Villers-au-Bois.

For the next four months the battalions of 56th (1st L) Division took their turns of duty in the trenches in front of Arras, carrying out occasional raids. Then on 15 July the division was relieved, 167th Bde going by rail to the Izel-lès-Hameau area. A period of intense training followed.

==== Hundred Days Offensive ====
The Allies' Hundred Days Offensive was launched on 8 August. 56th (1st L) Division joined in at the Battle of Albert on 23 August, with 168th Bde attacking. 167th Brigade made its attack next day, with 'Summit Trench' as its first objective. The barrage opened at 07.00 and began creeping forward at 07.10, followed by the tanks and infantry, 1st Londons on the right. Opposition was patchy and Summit Trench was easily taken by 10.00, but then news arrived of German reinforcements. Instead of moving on to its second objective, 56th (1st L) Division was ordered to prepare to receive a counter-attack. 167th Brigade was told to occupy the village of Croisilles by 'peaceful penetration'. The battalions sent patrols forward, but reports on the defences were inconsistent: an airman reported a tank already in the village (this turned out to be a broken-down German lorry). A fresh attack was ordered for 19.30 to take the Hindenburg Support Trench behind the village, with six tanks but little artillery support. The village was found to be strongly held, Croisilles Trench halfway to the objective proved to be only half-dug and useless as a reorganising point, so the attack was called off and Summit Trench became the line of resistance. Here the battalions were heavily shelled with gas during the night. British artillery bombarded Croisilles throughout 25 August, but a renewed attack by 167th Bde at 03.00 next morning was unsuccessful, the wire still uncut and machine guns unsuppressed. The brigade was then relieved. It returned to the front on 27 August (the fighting was later named the Battle of the Scarpe) and advanced next day, by which time the enemy had evacuated Croisilles.

56th (1st L) Division returned to the line near Cambrai on 6–8 September, and it then carried out a series of sidestepping reliefs until it was alongside the Arras–Cambrai road on 27 September when the Battle of the Canal du Nord was launched. While the Canadian Corps stormed the canal, 56th (1st L) Division advanced along it, clearing both banks. 167th Brigade was in reserve, afterwards sending patrols towards Palluel and entering it the next day. The division then held its position at Palluel facing the marshy ground along the canal. After the Battle of Cambrai (8–9 October) the Germans began pulling back and 167th Bde sent fighting patrols into Arleux, though it could not hold the town until the Canadians cleared it on 12 October during the pursuit to the River Selle.

56th (1st L) Division was sent back for rest on 15 October. It returned by motor bus on 1 November to the Denain area, ready for the Battle of the Sambre. The division was to attack east of Famars, with 167th Bde passing through the other two to clear the ground as far as the Aunelle river. On 3 November patrols reported that the enemy had retired, so the advance was carried out without opposition and 167th was not needed. The cavalry found the river strongly held, but next day the division crossed the river against half-hearted opposition. However the river Grand Honnelle beyond was in a deep, wooded ravine, and 168th Bde was repulsed on 5 November. 167th Brigade was to take over on the night of 6/7 November, but 168th Bde found that the enemy had retired and crossed the Grand Honnelle during the night. 167th Brigade led the advance that day and on 8 November, encountering little opposition, the leading troops having their supplies dropped by air. Then, as they approached the belt of woods west of Blaregnies they were stopped by artillery and machine gun fire. The division continued the advance on 9 November, halting for the night behind a line of outposts provided by 1st Londons. On 10 November 1st Londons advanced behind a screen of the 16th Lancers. They had passed through Harveng before opposition was encountered: machine gun fire from both flanks held up the cavalry. 1st Londons then attacked and cleared the ground, entering Harmignies and establishing a line beyond it.

56th (1st L) Division was relieved on the night of 10/11 November. Hostilities ended at 11.00 next morning when the Armistice with Germany came into force. The division was selected to become part of the British Army of the Rhine, but this was cancelled and it remained around Harveng through the winter. Demobilisation of key workers began in December, and then accelerated from January 1919 as units were progressively reduced to cadre strength. The first cadres began returning to the UK in mid-May, and 1st (City of London) Battalion, London Regiment was demobilised on 6 June 1919

==== Commanding officers ====
The following officers commanded 1/1st Londons during the war:

- Col P.B.G.O. Crowe, VD, on outbreak of war
- Lt-Col E.G. Mercer, CMG, TD, January–June 1916
- Lt-Col D.V. Smith, DSO, VD, June–October 1916 and February–April 1917 (mortally wounded)
- Lt-Col Kennard, October–November 1916 (Note: Probably A.C.H. Kennard, a reserve officer serving with the 19th Londons in 1914; the other COs of the 1/1st were all prewar officers of the 1st Londons.)
- Lt-Col W.R. Glover, CMG, DSO, TD, November 1916–March 1917 and April 1917 to the Armistice

=== 2/1st Londons ===
When the 1/1st Londons sailed for Malta in September 1914, the 2/1st Bn was already being formed at Handel Street. A serious shortage of equipment hampered the training of the 2nd Line TF units – at first 'wooden equivalents' had to be employed in place of rifles, later some .256-in Japanese Ariska rifles became available. Despite the difficulties, the battalions were quickly recruited up to full strength, and in mid-December 1914 the whole of 2/1st London Brigade assembled around Maidstone in Kent.

==== Malta ====
From Maidstone the brigade was ordered to Malta at short notice to relieve the 1/1st London Bde for service on the Western Front. The 1/1st Londons departed on 11 February 1915, leaving behind for the newcomers their obsolete Long Lee-Enfield rifles and Vickers-Maxim machine guns and the unfit personnel. While on Malta 2/1st London Bde continued training, maintained coastal patrols, guarded Prisoners of war, caught possible spies, and performed public duties. The battalions in Malta were still regarded as draft-finding units for the 1/1st Brigade, but in July they were ordered to prepare to go to Egypt as Service Battalions. 2/1st Londons left for Alexandria on 27 August.

==== Gallipoli ====
The brigade assembled at Abbassia Camp in Cairo and prepared to reinforce the Mediterranean Expeditionary Force fighting at Gallipoli. However, the brigade did not proceed as a complete formation, the battalions travelling individually. The 2/1st and 2/3rd Londons were the first to go, in September, being sent via Mudros to reinforce the Regulars of the 29th Division. 2/1st Londons landed at W Beach, Suvla, about midnight on 24 September, and were attached to 88th Bde. On arrival they were re-armed with modern Short Lee-Enfield rifles and then moved forward to the Brigade Reserve Area.

The battalion lost its first casualties while providing a working party on 28 September. The machine gun section went to Gun Hill while infantry detachments were attached to the 1st Essex Regiment for instruction in the firing line. Then the companies each spent a day in the firing line (6–10 October) before the whole battalion relieved the 1st Essex on 12 October. They were relieved in turn by the Newfoundland Regiment on 19 October and then alternated with the Newfoundlands on a weekly rotation in the line at Essex Ravine. By the end of November the battalion's casualties amounted to 22 killed or died of wounds, 57 wounded, and 445 sick, many with jaundice or frostbite. In early December all available men were working on a new communication trench back to the beach. The battalion was pulled out of the line on the evening of 18 December and embarked for Mudros early the following morning as part of the evacuation of Suvla. After a week's rest the battalion re-embarked on the Princess Alberta on 26 December and landed at V Beach at Cape Helles, bivouacking in the 88th Bde Reserve area and providing working parties for Gully Beach and the Eski Line. The 2/1st Londons were finally withdrawn on the night of 7/8 January 1916 during the evacuation of Helles.

The battalion returned to Egypt and was attached to 53rd (Welsh) Division at Wardan on 15 January 1916. Here it underwent rest and reorganisation until 2/1st London Bde concentrated at Sidi Bishr Camp at Alexandria in April. On 17 April the whole brigade embarked on HMT Transylvania and sailed to Marseille, landing on 24 April.

==== Disbandment ====
Once in France, the 2/1st Londons moved to Rouen, where they were broken up in May and the men were drafted, mainly to the 1/1st Londons in 56th (1st L) Division preparing for the attack at Gommecourt (see above). Meanwhile, the 3/1st Londons (see below), completing their training in the UK, were renumbered as the 'New' 2/1st Bn.

=== 3/1st and New 2/1st Londons ===
The 3/1st Londons was formed in January 1915 to provide drafts to the two battalions now serving overseas. At the end of April the 3rd Line battalions of the regiments of the old 1st London Brigade were concentrated at Tadworth in Surrey as the 3/1st London Brigade (popularly known as the Fusilier Brigade). In May the 3rd Line of the TF was reorganised, all the men who had not agreed to, or were medically unfit for overseas service, were transferred to 'provisional' units, the 3/1st London Bde forming 100th Provisional Battalion (see below). 3/1st Londons were now treated as a 'service' battalion and the role of draft-finding was transferred to the new 4/1st Londons (see below). At the end of the month the 3/1st London Brigade moved to Bury St Edmunds, later to Ipswich, and was soon recruited back to full strength after the departure of 100th Provisional Bn. In August it took the place of the 2/1st London Bde in 58th (2/1st London) Division and was numbered as 173rd (3/1st London) Bde.

58th (2/1st L) Division's training was still hampered by lack of equipment. Its units absorbed large drafts of recruits under the Derby scheme in February 1916. In Spring 1916 it took over coast defence duties, and in June it moved into camp outside Ipswich. That month the 3/1st Londons were renumbered to replace the disbanded 2/1st Bn (see above). On 10 July 1916 58th (2/1st L) Division concentrated at Sutton Veny for final battle training on Salisbury Plain. The old Japanese rifles were replaced by Lee–Enfields, and in December the division was declared ready for overseas service.

In January 1917, the battalion embarked at Southampton Docks for Le Havre, and joined the division concentrated around Lucheux. In February the division went into the line for the first time, at Ransart, south of Arras. This was considered a quiet sector, and the battalions were introduced to trench warfare by units of the 46th (North Midland) and 49th (West Riding) Divisions. From February to April the 58th Division advanced rapidly to follow up the German retreat to the Hindenburg Line and was then put to work to repair the roads and railways destroyed by the retreating enemy.

==== Bullecourt ====
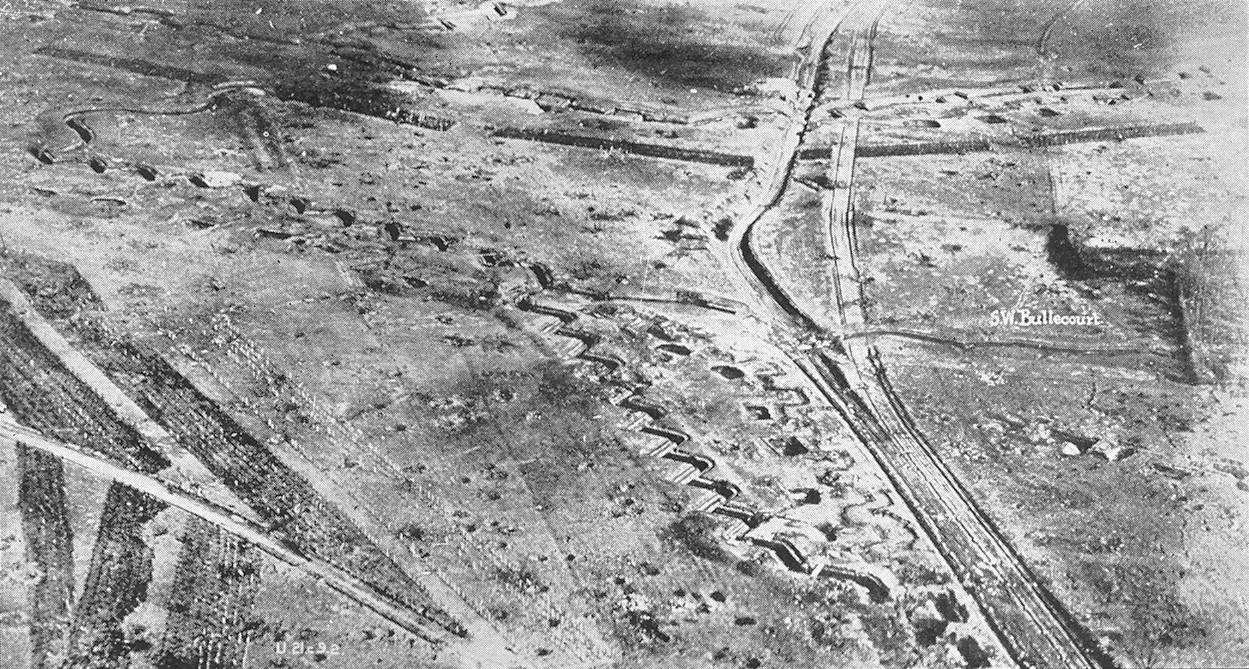
Aerial view of the Hindenburg Line south-west of Bullecourt

Under heavy shellfire during the night of 13/14 May, 173rd Bde relieved the 15th Australian Brigade, which had been attacking at the Second Battle of Bullecourt. 2/1st Londons were in brigade reserve while the rest of the brigade drove off a serious counter-attack on 15 May, the battalion relieving 2/4th Londons at the end of the day. The following day a company of 2/1st Londons captured the Hindenburg Support Line as far as the road to Hendecourt, and took some prisoners. On 17 May the rest of 58th (2/1st L) Division secured the remainder of Bullecourt village. 173rd Brigade was relieved on 21 May, going back into the line at the end of the month in Bullecourt itself, with 2/1st Londons in the front trenches. On 15 June 173rd Bde attacked a section of the Hindenburg Line west of the village from 'The Knuckle' to 'The Hump', supported by the full artillery of V Corps and three divisions. The troops had practised this attack several times over. The right of 173rd Bde's attack comprised one and a half companies of 2/1st Londons, with one company of 2/3rd Londons under its command on the extreme right. Zero Hour was set for 02.50, and after a struggle to overcome a number of pillboxes or Mebus, the objectives were taken and consolidated behind a standing barrage. The second phase of the attack, against a section of the Hindenburg Support line, followed at 03.10 the next day, with three companies of 2/1st Londons in the first wave followed by a 'mopping up' wave. Preparations for this attack were hampered by a series of German counter-attacks during the night, and although the attackers followed the creeping barrage onto the objectives, they were unable to recognise their positions in the shell-damaged line and got too far forward. There was a gap between the two wings that was still occupied by the enemy, who proceeded to 'bomb' their way back up the trenches, capturing many of the attackers. Artillery support could not be arranged, and by the end of the day no gains had been made and casualties were heavy.

==== Ypres ====
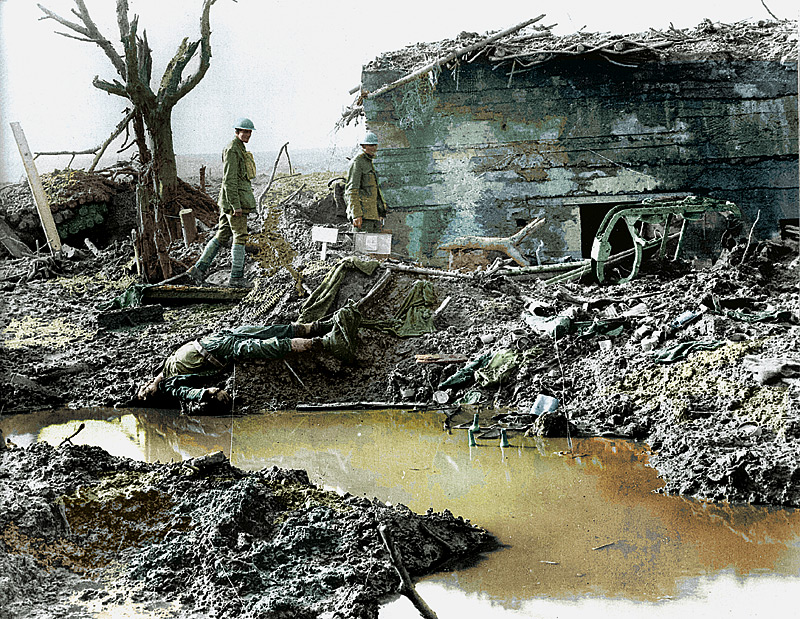
Captured German pillbox or Mebu at Passchendaele

58th (2/1st L) Division was relieved on 24 June and moved to Logeast Camp to reorganise, absorb replacements, and undergo training. After a period of trench holding in a quiet sector near Arras, it moved to the Ypres Salient in late August 1917. Here it trained for the continuing Third Ypres Offensive, 173rd Bde entering the line on 11/12 September. At 03.00 on 14 September, A Company of 2/1st Londons made a disastrous raid on the German strongpoint known as 'Winnipeg': of the 120 men who set out, 87 were afterwards reported as 'missing'. The German counter-raid at 19.30 was also a failure. During the attack of 20 September (the Battle of the Menin Road Ridge) 173rd Bde made a holding attack, for which 2/1st Londons was in reserve. Although 58th (2/1st L) Division participated in the Battle of Polygon Wood (26 September), 173rd Bde was not engaged, and afterwards the division went into reserve.

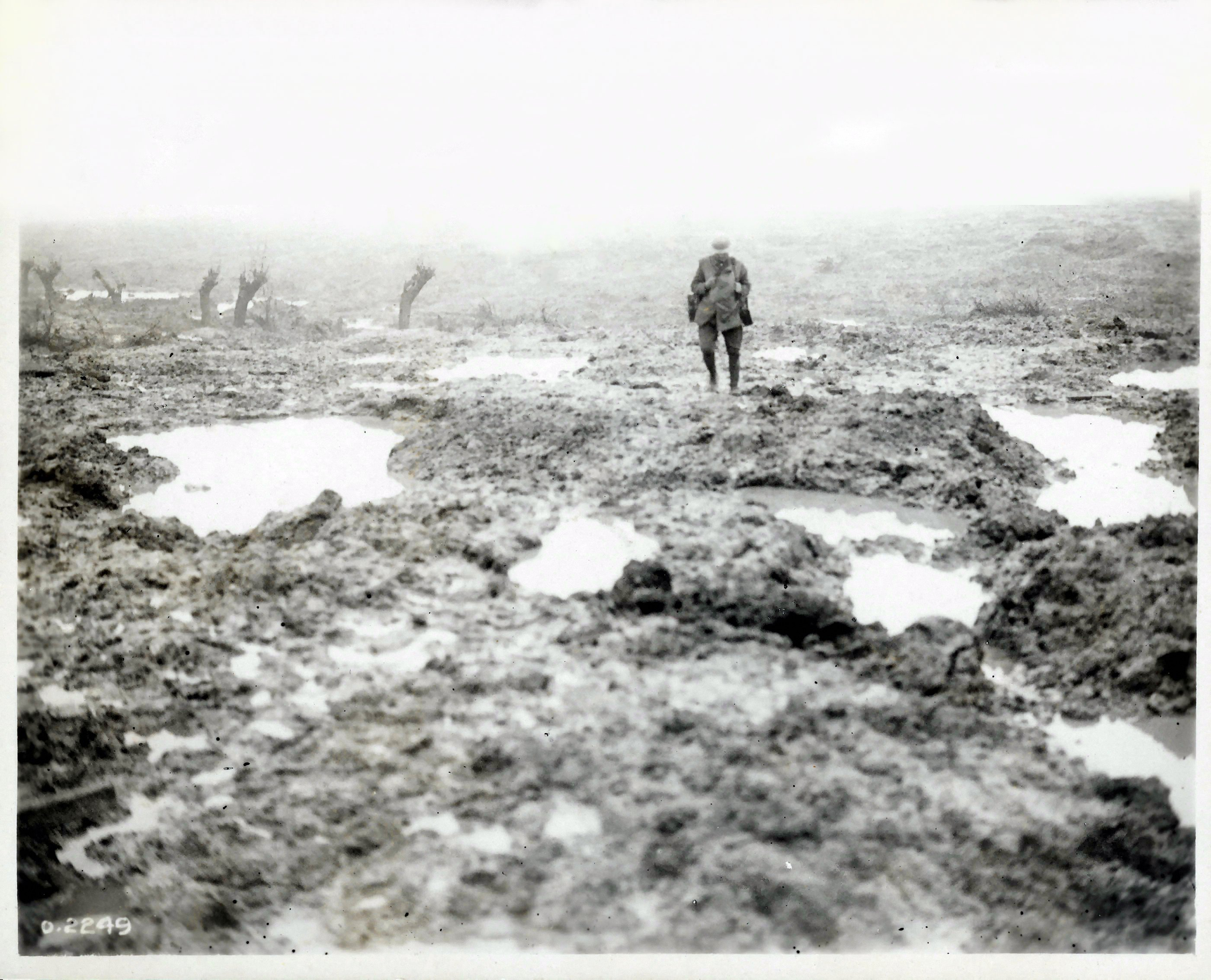
Passchendaele mud

The division returned to the line for the Second Battle of Passchendaele. 2/3rd and 2/2nd Londons with 2/1st Londons in support were detailed to capture and consolidate the first objective, then after 45 minutes the 2/4th Bn would leap-frog through and take 173rd Bde's second objective. But as the division arrived, the weather broke, and the pre-battle assembly in the Poelcapelle area was extraordinarily difficult. The brigade was obliged to jump off at 05.30 on 26 October from a line of flooded craters under enemy shellfire and follow a weak barrage that advanced too quickly. The men struggled up the boggy slope alongside the Lekkerboterbeek stream, sometimes up to their knees in mud. Exhausted, with hardly a rifle able to fire because of the mud, they got no closer than 250 yards (230 m) from their objective at 'Spider Crossroads' before being pushed back to their start line by a counter-attack at 07.20. In the following days 2/1st Londons loaned a large party to 58th Divisional Field Ambulance as stretcher-bearers, to help evacuate the suffering wounded from across the battlefield,

The 58th (2/1st L) Division remained at Poelcappelle to hold the line during November and December before it was transferred to the south in January 1918. Here it spent time digging defences, converting former French positions into the newly-devised defences in depth. When the BEF disbanded one in four of its battalions in February, 2/1st Londons was the one chosen from 173rd Bde. On 6 February 1918 the battalion disbanded, its personnel being distributed to 2/2nd, 2/3rd and 2/4th Londons in 173rd Bde, and to 1/4th Londons in 168th Bde of 56th (1st L) Division. At this point 1/1st Londons in 56th Division became simply 1st Londons (see above).

=== 4/1st Londons ===
The 4/1st Battalion was formed at Tadworth in May 1915 to train drafts for the two battalions already serving overseas and the 3/1st Bn preparing to go overseas in 58th (2/1st L) Division. It joined 173rd (3/1st London) Bde, then in January 1916 the reserve battalions for the whole 1st London Division were concentrated at Hurdcott on Salisbury Plain. On 8 April the unit's title was changed to 1st (Reserve) Bn, London Regiment, forming part of the 1st London Reserve Group (later 1st London Reserve Brigade). Voluntary recruitment was drying up, and on 1 September 1916 the 1st Reserve Bn absorbed the 2nd Reserve Bn, the composite battalion being commanded by Col Vickers Dunfree of the 4th Londons. In November 1916 the brigade went into winter quarters at Torquay in Devon, then in April 1917 moved to Blackdown Camp, near Aldershot. It continued to train recruits and prepare drafts until the end of the war and was disbanded at Shoreham on 15 August 1919.

=== 29th Londons ===
In June 1915 a reorganisation saw the men of the 3/1st London Brigade who were unfit for overseas service separated out into a composite battalion, the 100th Provisional Battalion. (Note: According to the regimental history of the 4th Londons; however, the Army Council Instruction establishing the provisional battalions specified that 100th Provisional Bn was actually to be composed of men from the 1st, 2nd, 4th and 7th Londons.) The new battalion was stationed at Aldeburgh, guarding the East Coast as part of 6th Provisional Brigade. In August, all the men of the Provisional Battalion were returned to their units except those who had not volunteered for overseas service. These men continued in home defence until 1916, when the Military Service Act swept away the Home/Overseas service distinction and the provisional battalions took on the dual role of home defence and physical conditioning to render men fit for drafting overseas. On 1 January 1917 the 100th Provisional Battalion absorbed the 102nd Provisional Battalion (the Home Service details of the 9th (Queen Victoria's Rifles), 10th (Hackney) and 12th (Rangers) Bns, London Regiment) and officially became the 29th (City of London) Battalion, London Regiment. The battalion never served overseas, and was demobilised early in 1919.

It is estimated that about 9408 men served in the 1st Londons at some point during the war, and a further 3681 passed through the 29th Londons.

== Interwar ==
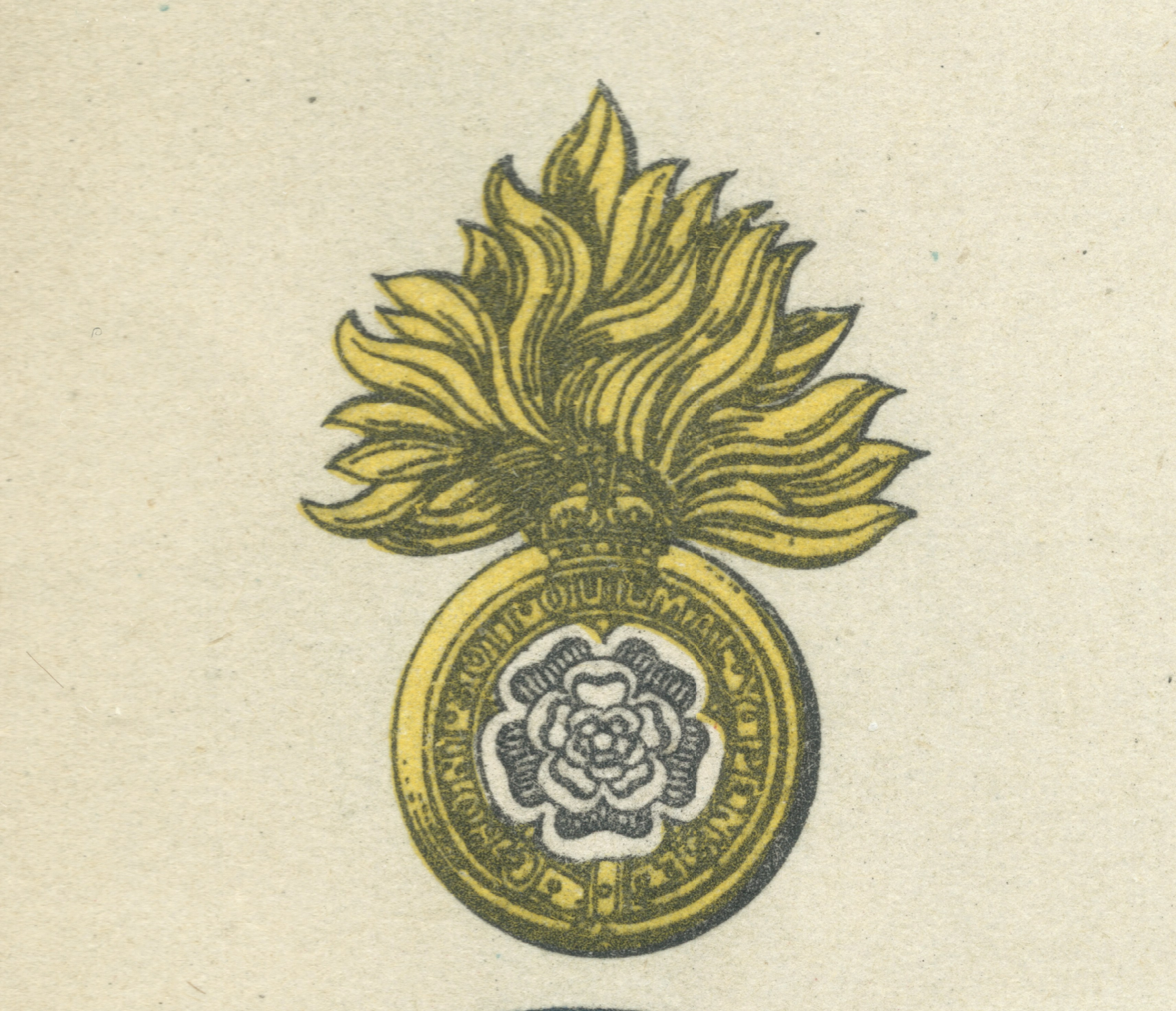
The Royal Fusiliers' cap badge in World War II

The TF was reconstituted on 7 February 1920 and the battalion reformed at Handel Street. The London Regiment had fallen into abeyance in 1916 and its battalions were treated as independent regiments affiliated to their former parent regiments, so the battalion's title was simplified in 1922 to 1st City of London Battalion, London Regiment (Royal Fusiliers). The TF was reorganised as the Territorial Army (TA) in 1921. Once again the battalion was part of 167th (1st London) Bde in 56th (1st London) Division. These became simply '1st London Bde' and '1st London Division' after 47th (2nd London) Division was disbanded in 1935.

The London Regiment was formally disbanded in 1938, the battalion having transferred to the Royal Fusiliers on 31 August 1937 as 8th (1st City of London) Battalion, Royal Fusiliers (City of London Regiment). (Note: Not to be confused with the 8th (Service) Battalion, a 'Kitchener's Army' unit of the Royal Fusiliers that served in World War I.)

== World War II ==
=== Mobilisation ===
The TA was doubled in size after the Munich Crisis, and 8th Royal Fusiliers formed a duplicate 2/8th Battalion at Potters Bar, with the first officers being commissioned on 19 April 1939; it was shortly afterwards redesignated 11th Battalion. (Note: Not to be confused with the 11th (Service) Battalion, another Kitchener's Army unit.)

Full mobilisation for the TA was ordered on 1 September 1939, two days before the declaration of war. 8th Royal Fusiliers mobilised next day at Handel Street under the command of Lt-Col E.H.L. White. 8th Royal Fusiliers was in 1st London Bde, while 11th Royal Fusiliers was in the duplicate 4th London Bde in 2nd London Division.

=== 8th Royal Fusiliers ===
The formation sign of 56th (London) Division featured Dick Whittington's cat.

After mobilisation the battalion moved to Stoke Newington, and then to Crowborough in East Sussex on 30 October. Organised as a motor division, 1st London Division was designated a 'Julius Caesar' anti-invasion formation in Eastern Command but was only partially equipped. At the time of the Dunkirk evacuation in late May 1940 it was rushed to the threatened area of East Kent, with 8th Royal Fusiliers using its collection of impressed civilian vehicles to move to Eastry and Herne Bay. The division was now reorganised as a conventional infantry division under XII Corps. On 18 November 1940 it regained its historic title of 56th (London) Division, and 10 days later 1st London Bde became 167 (1st London) Bde once more.

By then 8th Royal Fusiliers was stationed behind Dover, moving in February 1941 to Hawkhurst, and then to the coastal defence areas between Lydd and Dungeness, where it was stationed for six months. On 15 November 1941 56th (L) Division moved to XI Corps in East Anglia, with 8th Royal Fusiliers at Colchester in Essex, moving to Woodbridge, Suffolk, in early 1942, where it camped in Rendlesham Forest. It was now regarded as a field division, and came under War Office control on 21 June, preparatory to moving overseas. Lieutenant-Col White was promoted to Brigadier commanding 213 Bde on 23 July 1942 and was replaced as CO by Lt-Col E.A. Poulton, formerly CO of 2nd Royal Fusiliers.

==== Iraq and North Africa ====
8th Royal Fusiliers embarked on the transport Almanzora at Gourock on the River Clyde, and the convoy carrying 56th (L) Division sailed on 25 August 1942. It called at Freetown in Sierra Leone, where the men were issued with tropical kit. It then proceeded via Cape Town to Bombay, where the tropical kit was withdrawn and the troops transhipped to smaller vessels. These sailed on to Basra in Iraq, where the men disembarked on 4 November. 8th Royal Fusiliers then entrained for Kirkuk, a 600 miles (970 km) journey via Baghdad. 56th (L) Division was intended to reinforce Persia and Iraq Command (PAIC), but by the time it arrived, the threat to the Persian oilfields had diminished with the British victory at El Alamein and the lack of German progress at Stalingrad. The troops in PAIC were therefore able to undergo intensive training for service elsewhere. 56th (L) Division was selected for the planned Allied invasion of Sicily (Operation Husky), and its brigades trained in amphibious assault or desert and hill warfare. 167 and 169 Brigades were selected for the latter, carried out in the Dharbund Badzian Pass, some 600 miles (970 km) from Kirkuk.

56th (L) Division now had to move from Kirkuk via Palestine and Egypt to join Eighth Army in Tunisia, covering approximately 3200 miles between March and 19 April 1943. 8th Royal Fusiliers left on 28 March, some men going to Baghdad by rail, but thereafter the whole journey was by road using battalion transport supplemented by troop carrying vehicles (TCVs). Soon after they arrived and joined X Corps, 167 and 169 Bdes were thrown into the last stages of the Tunisian Campaign, because General Bernard Montgomery stated that he did not want to use an untried division in Husky. 169 Brigade took Djebel Terhouna during the night of 28/29 April, but was driven off the position the following morning, when Montgomery realised that the division needed time to learn battlecraft.

The division went into action again during the final advance on Tunis (Operation Vulcan), 167 Brigade attacking 'Razorback Ridge' on the evening of 9 May with 8th and 9th Royal Fusiliers supported by Valentine tanks. W Company (Note: Traditionally, some battalions of the Royal Fusiliers designated their companies W, X, Y and Z rather than A, B, C and D.) of 8th Royal Fusiliers on the right would capture Ateya at the north edge of the ridge while X Company on the left would capture Tebega further south, the highest point. Y Company was to follow W and carry on to capture El Matouch; Z would be in reserve behind X. The battalion moved off over the Djebel es Sourrah feature at 17.35 and advanced across the open valley of Wadi Rheribi covered by a smokescreen fired by the divisional artillery, which also put down concentrations of high explosive on the enemy positions. The advancing troops suffered severe casualties from incoming fire, particularly when the smoke began to clear: Lt-Col Poulton requested more smoke as the leading companies reached the foot of the ridge. W Company advanced across a minefield and took Atela despite heavy fire from above and in enfilade from Point 162, the highest part of Tebega, where X Company had been held up by the minefield and machine gun fire. Y Company also came under heavy fire as it advanced to join W Company. By nightfall about 60 men of W and Y Companies held Atela and had driven off counter-attacks, but could not dig in on the rocky ground. Poulton then launched Z Company in a silent night attack to capture Point 162 'if humanly possible', but the company was recalled on orders from Brigade HQ, followed by orders for both battalions to return to their starting positions. 8th Royal Fusiliers' withdrawal was covered by Z Company and the Carrier platoon. The battalion had lost 41 killed and 101 wounded. Successes on other fronts meant that X Corps' costly action did not need to be continued, and the remaining Axis troops in Tunisia surrendered on 13 May. (Earlier surrender negotiations with X Corps' direct opponents carried on through 8th Royal Fusiliers' lines had failed on 11 May.)

==== Salerno ====
Because of Montgomery's doubts, 56th (L) Division was not in fact used in Operation Husky. Instead it moved back to Tripoli in Libya for further training in combined operations at Zuara, first 'dryshod', then with waterproofed vehicles and landing craft. Here Lt-Col Poulton was hospitalised and had to relinquish command of 8th Royal Fusiliers (he later became a staff colonel at GHQ Middle East Forces). Major J.R. Cleghorn assumed temporary command until Lt-Col J. Oliver-Bellasis arrived to take over. While the Sicilian campaign continued, planning began for Operations Avalanche and Baytown, the assault landings on mainland Italy. 56th (London) Division was assigned to Avalanche, to land at Salerno. Loading began on 1 September and the assault troops of 56th (L) Division set sail from Tripoli aboard convoy TSS-1 on 3 September.

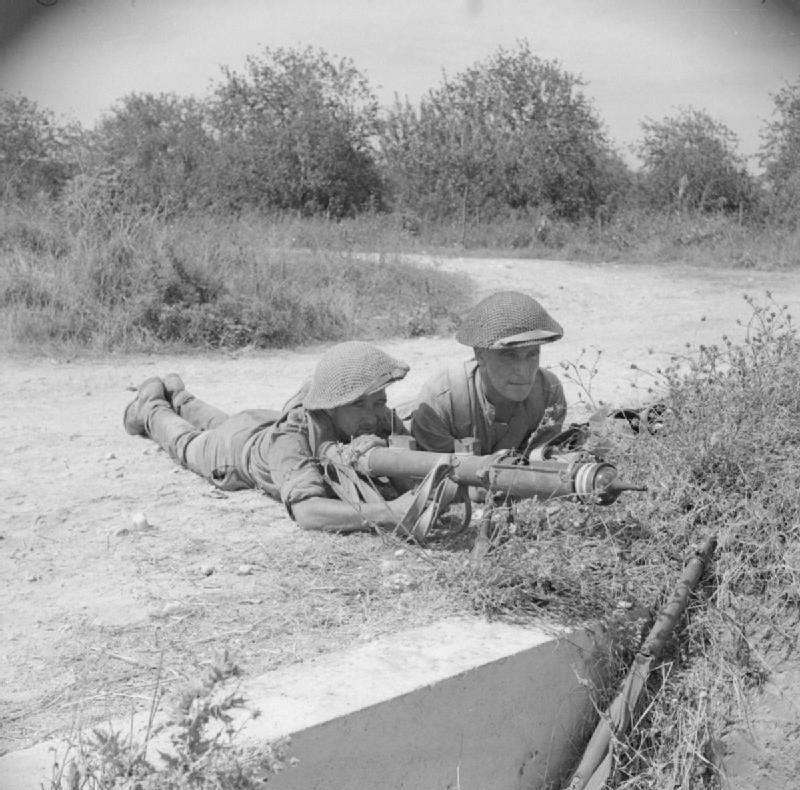
A 9th Royal Fusiliers PIAT team at Salerno

H-Hour was at 03.30 on 9 September. 167 Bde's leading infantry landing craft touched down at 03.35 covered by naval gunfire, with 8th (right) and 9th (left) Battalions Royal Fusiliers landing either side of the Tusciano river. There was little or no return fire, so the troops pushed inland, followed by the tanks of A Squadron, Royal Scots Greys, landing at 06.00. It was only then that the covering destroyer, HMS Laforey, found a target in some guns a little to the left of 8th Royal Fusiliers' landing beach (the battalion had landed 900 yards (820 m) south of its intended point, otherwise it would have run straight into these guns). In a duel with these guns Laforey was hit five times and withdrew, to be replaced by HMS Lookout. With fire support from Lookout, Z Company captured the gun positions with the bayonet. W and X Companies continued inland, but their supporting tanks became bogged down and they were attacked by five German tanks, at least one of which mounted a flamethrower that caused horrific casualties amongst one platoon. Three of the battalion's own anti-tank guns were knocked out and Lt-Col Oliver-Bellasis was wounded. Major Cleghorn took over command as soon as he landed, and brought Y and Z companies into action on the flank of the Germans, the flamethrowing tank being disposed of by a PIAT. Meanwhile, two bulldozers had towed out the Scots Greys' tanks, which then ambushed the rest of the Germans tanks when they advanced too confidently. By nightfall 8th Royal Fusiliers was established astride the Battipaglia–Sta Lucia road and the situation was quiet, though the battalion was far short of its objective for the day, some 15 miles (24 km) inland.

It remained relatively quiet for 8th Royal Fusiliers next day, then on 11 September the battalion moved to Sta Lucia where it was attacked at 19.30, some men falling back until they were rallied. The battalion sent out fighting patrols that night and advanced again next morning. On 14 September the battalion was finally relieved and 167 Bde was sent to 46th Division's supposedly quieter sector, where it was counter-attacked while taking over. 8th Royal Fusiliers spent the next two weeks round the village of Piegollellel, where Lt-Col Oliver-Bellasis rejoined and some reinforcements arrived. The advancing Eighth Army was now approaching and the Salerno beachhead was no longer isolated: the Germans withdrew abruptly. The battalion's last heavy casualties at Salerno came on 22 September when a patrol was ambushed. In all the battalion suffered 206 casualties in the beachhead.

==== Volturno to the Garigliano ====
X Corps began its advance out of the beachhead on the night of 22/23 September and began the pursuit towards Naples, 56th (L) Division moving up on 26 September. Two days later 8th Royal Fusiliers formed the advanced guard of 167 Bde as it moved up Route 8, clearing Baronissi and reaching Costa on 30 September, when X Corps entered Naples. By 11 October, the division was on the Volturno Line but 167 Bde's attempt to cross the river on the night of 12/13 October failed when 7th Oxfordshire and Buckinghamshire Light Infantry (OBLI) were spotted while forming up. The brigade continued to keep the enemy pinned along the river. 8th Royal Fusiliers in Capua carried out active patrolling – on the night of 14/15 October a patrol crossed in an assault boat and came back with a prisoner – and next day 9th Bn established a small bridgehead. Eventually 8th Royal Fusiliers moved by motor transport and crossed the bridge into the larger American bridgehead. From here 167 Bde carried out an unorthodox attack to clear the country between the Volturno and Garigliano rivers. 7th OBLI captured Tranzi in a night attack, then 8th Royal Fusiliers formed up behind before a dawn attack, in which they advanced laterally (westwards) to clear the front of 169 Bde before turning north and assaulting the high ground at Borgo–Pugliano. Some of the supporting artillery fell short, but the battalion was late starting and was not hit. The leading companies met little opposition, but Battalion Tactical HQ ran into a pocket of the enemy and had to be extricated by Battalion Main HQ, who took a number of prisoners. The second phase attack, with tank support, was almost unopposed, thanks to the success of the neighbouring 46th Division.

This brought the division to the Bernhardt Line, where it was tasked with capturing Monte Camino, blocking the entrance to the Liri Valley. The first attack up 'Bare Arse Ridge' on 6 November by 7th OBLI and 201 Guards Brigade failed with heavy casualties. The division then prepared for a fullscale attack (the Battle of Monte Camino) including building Jeep tracks and dumps from which mules supplied the frontline troops in rain and mud while the battalions trained for mountain warfare. 167 Brigade's plan was for a brigade 'Battle Patrol' to clear Bare Arse Ridge as far as Point 727, which would then be held by the depleted 7th OBLI while 8th and 9th Royal Fusiliers passed by to assault the summit (Point 819) by pincer movement. The attack was launched with heavy artillery support on the evening of 2 December, 8th Royal Fusiliers crossing its start line at 18.15. Each man was heavily laden with winter clothing, ammunition and equipment and 48-hour rations. They followed lines of tracer from Bofors guns guiding them through the fading light and the dust thrown up by the bombardment. 9th Royal Fusiliers passed Point 727 at 04.00, but 8th Royal Fusiliers following in single file could not be in position for the assault planned for 06.00. The two COs agreed that 9th Bn would carry out the attack, with Y Company of 8th Bn, which arrived at 05.30, tasked with taking Point 819 itself. The company carried this out by a converging attack by the two leading platoons. However, 169 Bde's attack on Monte Camino monastery had failed, and 8th Royal Fusiliers was subjected to heavy fire as it consolidated on the objective. The medical officer was among those killed, and it took seven hours to evacuate each wounded man down the mule track. Holding the position in the rain and cold, the battalion began to suffer cases of trench foot. 201 Guards Bde passed through the position the following night to capture the monastery but the battalion was not finally relieved until 6 December, by which time it had suffered 135 casualties.

56th (L) Division was next tasked with capturing a bridgehead across the Garigliano. The division moved up to the river on 14 December and spent the next month patrolling across the wide No man's land and reconnoitring the crossing sites. Unlike the Volturno crossing, detailed planning and rehearsal were undertaken. 8th Royal Fusiliers had 40 Commando and one company of the depleted 7th OBLI attached to it. The operation was timed for 21.00 on 17 January 1944, and 8th Royal Fusiliers had their assault boats in the water at the exact minute. Surprise was complete, there was little opposition, and the battalion was fully across at the Grotte Farm in just over an hour. It then passed through a minefield and dealt with enemy outposts before reaching the start line for its attack just after midnight. X and Y Companies then attacked the Damiano feature with heavy artillery support, Z Company passing through to complete the first objective. It was in mopping up enemy posts on the hillside that the battalion suffered its heaviest casualties, the companies dwindling to 30–40 effectives. By 09.10 on 18 January Z Company had cleared the enemy from Point 275 and sent a patrol to Point 441 that was driven back by its own artillery fire. However, there had been less success elsewhere and the battalion stopped to consolidate its gains. It gained a little more ground on 19 January, but it had to beat off heavy counter-attacks next day before it was relieved and moved to Lorenzo. However, part of that village was still in enemy hands and the depleted battalion (Y and Z Companies had been temporarily combined) had to clear it by street fighting. The battalion had lost 144 casualties in the operation, and badly needed the few reinforcements who arrived on 26 January. Further low-level operations in the Lorenzo district served for the battle-initiation of the reinforcements. Major Cleghorn left the battalion to take command of 9th Royal Fusiliers.

==== Anzio ====
The Allies had carried out an amphibious assault at Anzio on 22 January 1944 with the intention of outflanking the German positions at Monte Cassino, but the enemy had succeeded in sealing off the beachhead, where trench warfare had set in. In early February 56th (L) Division was ordered to pull out and go by sea to reinforce the beachhead. 167 Brigade embarked at Naples on 12 February, each fusilier battalion travelling in one Landing Ship, Tank for HQ and transport, and one Landing Craft Infantry for each of the three companies. They arrived off Anzio at 08.00 next day and immediately came under air attack. The brigade took over part of the line from US troops on the night of 14/15 February, with 8th Royal Fusiliers in the centre. At 06.15 on 16 February a strong German counter-attack (Operation Fischfang or 'Catching Fish') developed, accompanied by artillery and mortar fire and air attacks. The close country suited infiltration attacks, and the fighting was confused. By 15.00 two platoons of X Company had been overwhelmed and the remains of the company, one officer and 20 men, were withdrawn that night. Y Company also had only one officer and 10 men left fighting. Fighting continued on 17 February before the enemy withdrew, leaving Z Company still holding the position. The Germans resumed the attack on 18 February, when 8th Royal Fusiliers had a fourth company, made up from 67 newly arrived reinforcements. This scratch company held its ground, but Z Company was surrounded and eventually overrun, the survivors being taken prisoner. Lieutenant-Col Oliver-Bellasis formed another scratch company out of the remains of Y Company and HQ personnel (clerks, orderlies, cooks and drivers) and held the ground until 09.00 on 19 February, when a company of the London Scottish arrived to help. The situation was comparatively quiet on 20–22 February, and 8th Royal Fusiliers received another 40 reinforcements. On the evening of 22 February and next day the enemy attacked again, but the improvised R Company held its ground, killing many of the enemy and capturing prisoners and equipment. R Company, enlarged to 150 men in five platoons but still taking casualties from mortar fire, maintained its position until being partially relieved on 1/2 March (the battalion loaned four platoons to 9th Royal Fusiliers) and finally re-assembled in the B Echelon area on 7 March. In all, the unit had suffered 443 casualties. It was evacuated from the beachhead on 9 March and sailed back to Naples.

56th (L) Division was now so weak that the whole division was sent to Egypt to rest and reorganise. 167 Brigade sailed on 28 March from Taranto aboard the troopship Empire Pride. Lieutenant-Col Oliver-Bellasis relinquished command of 8th Royal Fusiliers on the grounds of length of service overseas and Lt-Col J. Sperling took over. The brigade moved to a hutted camp at Beni Yousef, where the Fusilier battalions were reinforced by a draft of gunners from disbanded anti-aircraft regiments from the Canal Zone, who had been retrained as infantrymen. They were integrated over the next four months.

==== Gothic Line ====
56th (L) Division set sail from Port Said on 12 July and landed at Taranto on 17 July 1944, taking over the transport and equipment of 78th Division, which was leaving for refit in Egypt. On 4 August 56th (L) Division moved to Assisi, where it formed part of the reserve behind Eighth Army, which was preparing for the attack on the Gothic Line (Operation Olive). The offensive opened on 25 August 1944, and once the leading divisions had broken into the German positions, 56th (L) Division was used to widen the breach on 1 September. 169 Brigade captured Mondarno, then 167 Bde, with 8th Royal Fusiliers and 7th OBLI leading, attacked on 4 September. W and X Companies advanced at 03.00 to the River Ventena, crossed over, and reached their objectives. Y company was to pass through and capture Faggeto, but at daybreak W Company came under heavy machine gun fire from a German outpost in San Felice. Under covering fire from W Company, Y Company cleared this hamlet (the two sides were too close together to call down artillery support) and then went on to take Faggeto as well. However, commanders believed that a breakthrough had been achieved, and 167 Bde was ordered to press straight on to capture Croce. 9th Royal Fusiliers ran into trouble on 5 September and 8th Royal Fusiliers' advance had to be stopped and the battalion remained under shellfire before supporting the 9th. By morning on 6 September the enemy had recaptured all of Croce, and 8th Royal Fusiliers was withdrawn so that the artillery could bombard the town. A fighting patrol reported the town now clear, but when X and Y Companies entered they found themselves in a fight with German armour and suffered heavy casualties before British tanks and other units arrived to complete the capture. Y and Z Companies had to be temporarily combined, with a fighting strength of 23 men. In all the battalion had lost about 193 men.

The next task was to penetrate the Germans' reserve position, the Rimini Line. At 23.30 on 13 September 8th Royal Fusiliers and 7th OBLI advanced to attack the Sensoli Ridge, an attack made according to the regimental history 'in pitch darkness and over "wicked country, through wadis and hills, a real nightmare".' There had not been time for proper reconnaissance, and movement was by compass bearing. By 04.30 the battalion had covered about 4,000 yards (3,700 m), taking the enemy completely by surprise and capturing prisoners at each house encountered, together with two Panzer IV tanks and one half-track. At 05.45 the battalion began to consolidate its position but was counter-attacked by another Panzer IV, a half-track and some infantry, who overran Y Company's position. However, W Company held its ground, knocking out the tank with a PIAT and a captured anti-tank gun. The fusiliers tried to get one of the captured tanks working, but although they managed to drive it to block the road, they could not work the main gun. However, its machine guns proved useful when, having been pinned down all day, the battalion advanced the following night to clear the Mulazzo ridge. Enemy shelling died away on 17 September, and the battalion was relieved on 21 September.

Because of a shortage of reinforcements in the Mediterranean theatre, on 23 September 1944 most of the men of 8th (1st London) Royal Fusiliers were absorbed into the 9th (2nd London) Royal Fusiliers commanded by the CO of the 9th, Lt-Col 'Jock' Cleghorn (formerly second-in-command of the 8th). In a compliment to the 8th Bn, the 9th Royal Fusiliers redesignated its A, B C and D Companies as W, X, Y and Z. 8th Royal Fusiliers was reduced to a cadre of six officers and 60 other ranks commanded by Maj E.C. Elstone, later by Maj G.M. Williams, and was attached to 168 Bde, now a holding formation (apart from a period back with 167 Bde from 24 October until 27 November).

In December it was decided to disband the cadre and draft the remainder as reinforcements, until it was pointed out that the remaining personnel were largely administrative and unsuited to being riflemen. Thus on 23 December the cadre of 8th Royal Fusiliers was converted into X Corps Court Martial and Holding Centre at Sarnano. In March 1945 the same team was used to form a Prisoner-of-war camp at Ancona. 8th Royal Fusiliers was reformed in Egypt on 23 April that year, although it was not possible to use the original cadre. The battalion served in Iraq after the war and finally passed into suspended animation on 16 December 1946.

During its campaign in Italy, 8th Royal Fusiliers had lost 16 officers and 186 other franks (ORs) killed, 39 officers and 686 ORs wounded.

=== 11th Royal Fusiliers ===
47th (2nd London) Division's insignia featured Bow Bells.

11th Royal Fusiliers, like the 8th Bn, was mobilised on 2 September at Fusilier Hall, Handel Street, and was immediately sent to guard the explosives factory at Waltham Abbey. Later W Company was stationed at the Tower of London and guards were also provided for No 4 Balloon Centre at Chigwell, and RAF Hendon. Battalion HQ at this time was established at Regent's Park Barracks from 21 October, moving to Potters Bar on 2 December. 2nd London Division, like the 1st, was organised as a motor division in Eastern Command. By May 1940 it was stationed in and around London.

After the BEF was evacuated from Dunkirk, the division was converted on 4 June 1940 into a standard infantry division for home defence, first in XI Corps in East Anglia, then from late June in South Wales under Western Command, with 11th Royal Fusiliers at Tenby, moving to Malvern for the winter. On 21 November, 2nd London Division regained its historic title of 47th (2nd London) Division, with 4th London Bde becoming 140 (London) Bde. On 16 February 1941 47th (2nd L) Division transferred to IV Corps (later to V Corps) and manned coast defences in West Sussex. 11th Royal Fusiliers covered a 12 miles (19 km) frontage between Chichester Channel and Pagham Rife.

47th (2nd L) Division laid special emphasis on training and established a divisional battle school, with 11th Royal Fusiliers supplying a number of the instructors. However, in December 1941 the division was placed on a lower establishment, an acknowledgement that it was unlikely to see overseas service and its role would be coast defence and supplying reinforcements to other formations. It replaced the disbanded Hampshire County Division, with 11th Royal Fusiliers defending the coast between Christchurch Harbour and Lymington Harbour. On 31 December the battalion's CO, Lt-Col J.H.T. Mardell, left to command the GHQ Battle School. He was replaced by Lt-Col R.E.J.St G.T. Ransome from 18th Royal Fusiliers.

==== Bruneval ====
Although 11th Royal Fusiliers saw no active service as a battalion, a detachment was in action during the Bruneval Raid (Operation Biting). Captain J. Bune and selected NCOs with men drawn from the anti-aircraft platoon of HQ Company manned the guns on the boats used to extract the paratroops after the raid on a German radar station on the French coast. The extraction was carefully rehearsed on a piece of coastline that resembled Bruneval and the men learned how to saturate their target with automatic fire at 500 yards (460 m). As the boats approached the French coast in moonlight on the night of the raid (27/28 February 1942) the men could hear the paratroops in action ashore. The firing died down and the boats received the signal from the shore. As the first wave touched down to pick up the paratroops with their prisoners and casualties, firing started up from the clifftop, to which the fusiliers replied with automatic fire, completely silencing the enemy before the last boats turned for home. The returning flotilla avoided German surface ships, and at daylight they were given a fighter escort back to England.

In April 1942, 11th Royal Fusiliers was chosen to give a demonstration of battalion tactics with artillery support at Larkhill in front of senior Allied generals and VIP guests from Prime Minister Winston Churchill down. However, the battalion began to lose strength thereafter, sending reinforcement drafts to 8th and 9th Royal Fusiliers, and by 1 August it was down to 23 officers and 495 ORs. In December 1942, 11th Royal Fusiliers received a draft of men from 16th Royal Fusiliers, which was being converted into a medium regiment of the Royal Artillery, and In November 1943 it received part of 17th Royal Fusiliers when that battalion was disbanded. However, a high proportion of the conscripts posted to the battalion later were physically or mentally unfit to be infantrymen and the battalion was considered non-operational, although it took part in two exercises with 140 Bde on the Isle of Wight in July 1943.

In January 1944 47th (2nd L) Division moved to Northern Command, with 11th Royal Fusiliers based at Hartlepool. It then returned to Hampshire. After D Day the lower establishment divisions were run down to provide reinforcements to the fighting formations, and 11th Royal Fusiliers was effectively disbanded on 30 August. It formally left the division on 10 August and was placed in suspended animation on 3 October 1944. (When 47th Division reformed a few weeks later, 140 (4th London) Bde was replaced by 213 Bde under Brig E.H.L. White, formerly CO of 8th RF, which was renumbered 140 Bde.)

== Postwar ==
56th (London) Armoured Divisional sign 1948–1951

56th (London) Divisional sign 1951–1961

When the TA was reconstituted on 1 January 1947 the 8th and 11th Battalions were reformed from suspended animation as a single 8th Battalion at Handel Street. It formed part of 168 Lorried Infantry Brigade in 56th (London) Armoured Division. The 56th reverted to being an infantry division in 1955 and 8th Royal Fusiliers transferred to 167 (City of London) Brigade.

The TA was reduced in size after the ending of National Service, and on 1 May 1961 8th Royal Fusiliers absorbed 624th (Royal Fusiliers) Light Anti-Aircraft Regiment, Royal Artillery – the former 2nd Londons – to form The City of London Battalion as the sole TA battalion of the Royal Fusiliers. s

When the TA was reduced into the Territorial and Army Volunteer Reserve on 1 April 1967 the battalion became C Company (The City of London Company, Royal Fusiliers), Fusilier Volunteers at Balham in TAVR II. When the four English fusilier regiments merged to form the Royal Regiment of Fusiliers on 24 April 1968 the Fusilier Volunteers became its 5th (Volunteer) Battalion, with the company redesignated C Company (City of London).

On 16 May 1988 the 5th (V) Battalion was given a dual affiliation with the Royal Regiment of Fusiliers and The Queen's Regiment, and was renamed 8th (Volunteer) Battalion The Queen's Fusiliers (City of London), still with a C (City of London) Company at Balham and St Mary Cray. On 20 April 1993 a new London Regiment was established. 8th Battalion, Queen's Fusiliers was split up, with A Company and one platoon of C Company merged to form the new regiment's C (City of London Fusiliers) Company, the rest of C Company forming part of the new HQ (Anzio) Company and with B Company becoming the new B (Queen's Regiment) Company. In 2006 C (City of London) Company of the London Regiment was renamed C (City of London Fusiliers) Company.

== Heritage & ceremonial ==
=== Uniforms & insignia ===
In 1876 the 19th Middlesex RVC wore a uniform of bluish grey with scarlet facings, a grey Kepi with a black and scarlet band and grey cock's feathers. When it became a battalion of the Royal Fusiliers it adopted that regiment's scarlet tunic with blue facings, and retained this for full dress after it became a battalion of the London Regiment. The battalion (in common with the 2nd, 3rd and 4th Londons) was permitted to use the coat of arms of the City of London as an emblem.

Units of the TF were granted the privilege of carrying Colours and these were presented in 1909. The regimental colour of the 1st Londons bore the Royal Fusiliers' emblem (the 'United Red and White Rose' (the Tudor rose) with the Imperial Crown within a garter) in each of the four corners.

In April 1917 1/2nd Londons wore a circular yellow recognition patch on each shoulder and painted on each side of the helmet.

=== Honorary Colonels ===
The following served as Honorary Colonel of the battalion:

- Col Thomas Hughes, founding CO, appointed 26 May 1869
- Gen Sir Daniel Lysons, GCB, appointed 26 June 1880, died 29 January 1898
- Maj-Gen Sir Henry Trotter, GCVO, appointed 16 March 1898
- Sir Herbert Merton Jessel, Baronet, MP, retired captain 17th Lancers and major, Imperial Yeomanry, appointed 2 December 1905.
- Henry, Viscount Lascelles (later 6th Earl of Harewood), KG, GCVO, DSO, TD, captain, Grenadier Guards, appointed 17 February 1923
- Col Sir Cullum Welch, 1st Baronet, OBE, MC, Lord Mayor of London, appointed 16 March 1956
- Col Edward Harcourt Hillersdon, DSO, TD, appointed (to City of London Bn) 20 October 1965

=== Battle Honours ===
The 1st London Regiment and 8th Royal Fusiliers were awarded the following Battle honours:
Second Boer War:
South Africa 1900–02
World War I:
Aubers, Somme 1916, '18, Albert 1916, '18, Flers–Courcelette, Morval, Le Transloy, Arras 1917, '18, Scarpe 1917, '18, Bullecourt, Ypres 1917, Langemarck 1917, Menin Road, Polygon Wood, Passchendaele, Cambrai 1917, Hindenburg Line, Canal du Nord, Valenciennes, Sambre, France and Flanders 1915–18, Gallipoli 1915–16, Egypt 1916
World War II:
Djebel Tebaga, North Africa 1943, Salerno, Teano, Monte Camino, Garigliano Crossing, Damiano, Anzio, Gothic Line, Coriano, Croce, Italy 1943–45.

The honours in bold were those chosen to be emblazoned on the King's colour.

=== Memorials ===
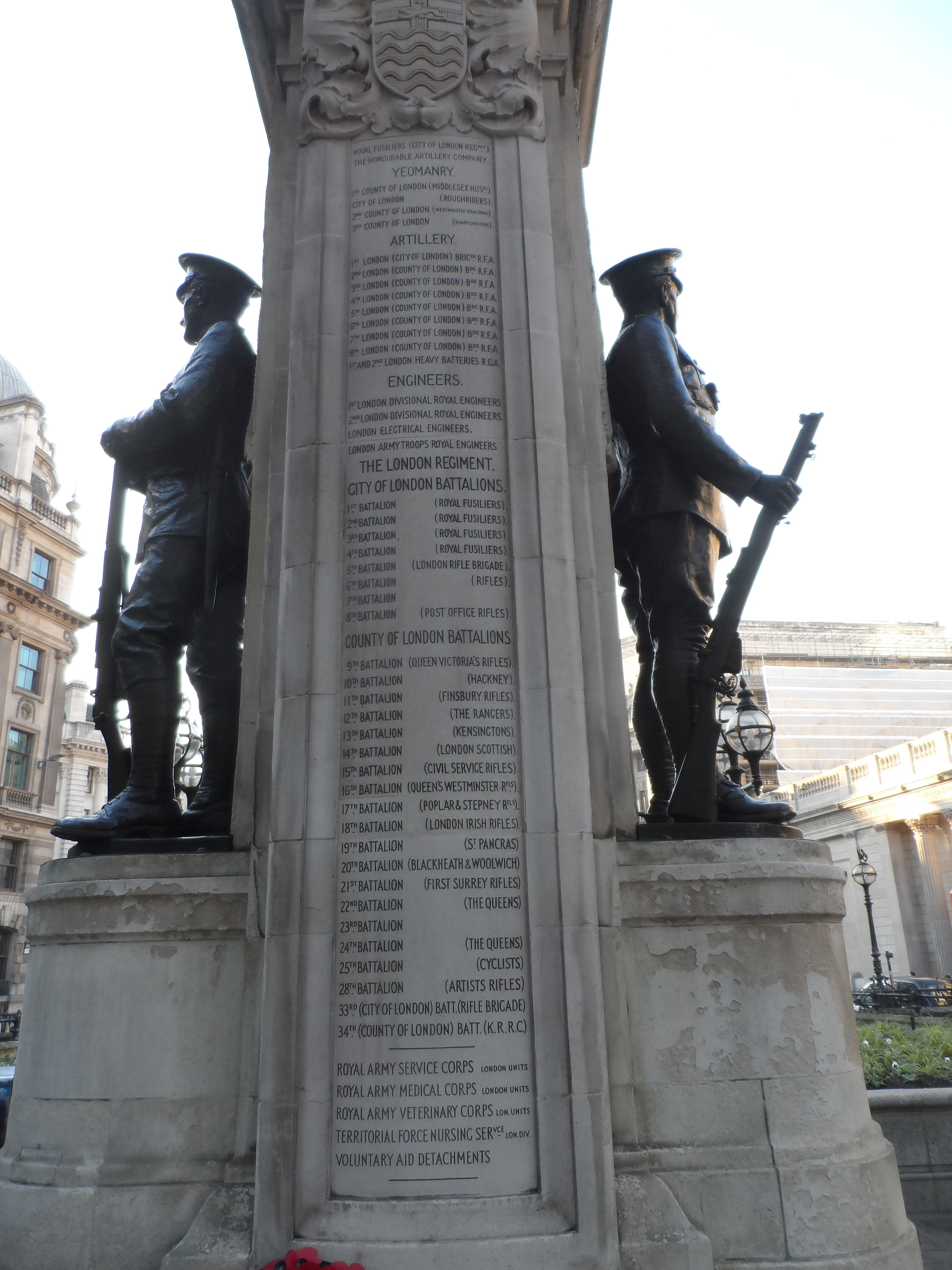
London Troops Memorial at the Royal Exchange

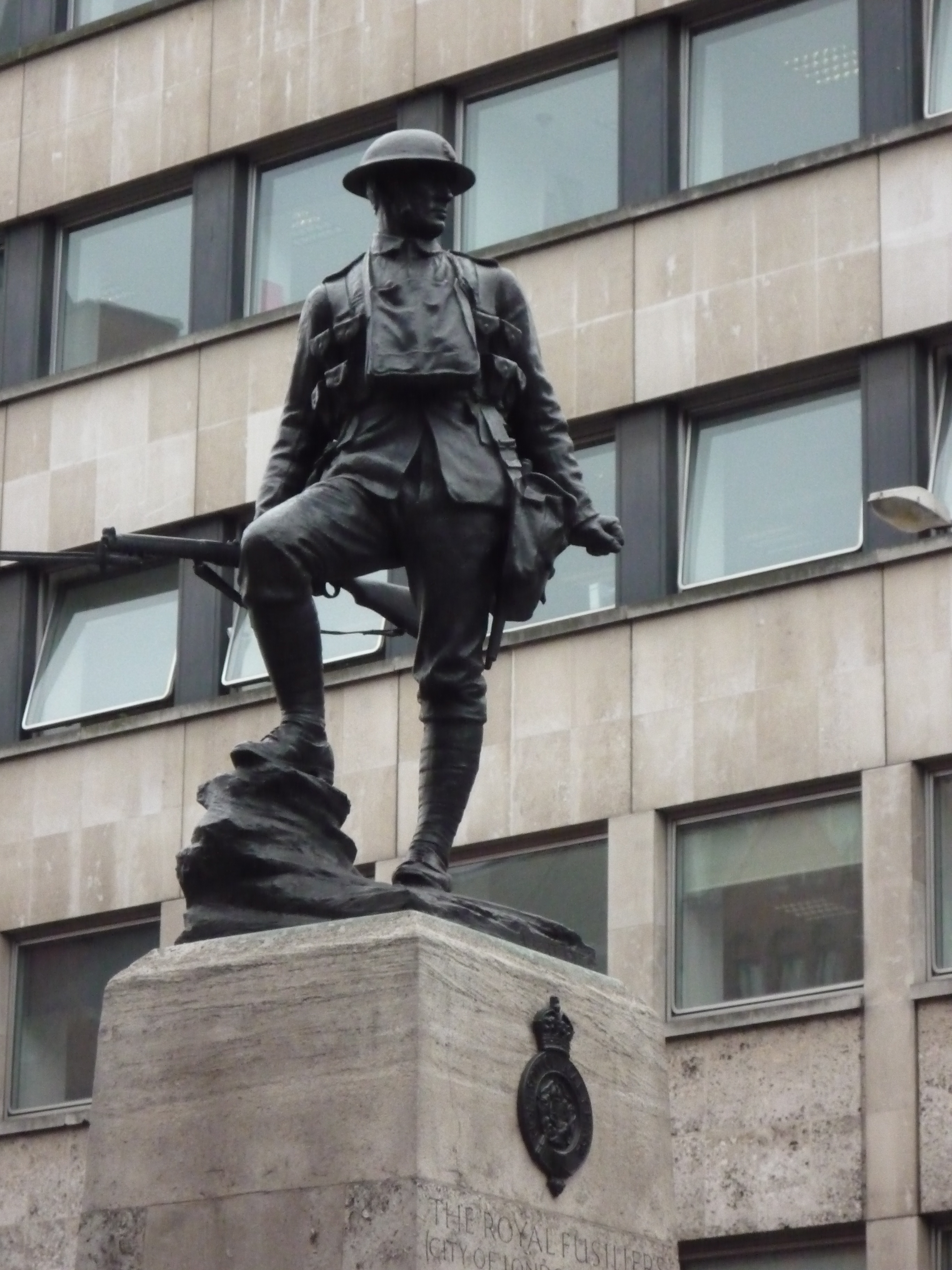
Royal Fusiliers Memorial at Holborn Bar

The 1st London Battalion is listed on the City and County of London Troops Memorial in front of the Royal Exchange, with architectural design by Sir Aston Webb and sculpture by Alfred Drury. The right-hand (southern) bronze figure flanking this memorial depicts an infantryman representative of the various London infantry units.

The battalion is also listed on the pedestal of the Royal Fusiliers War Memorial at Holborn Bar, which is surmounted by a bronze figure of a Fusilier sculpted by Albert Toft. In the absence abroad of the Regular battalions when it was unveiled on 4 November 1922, a composite Guard of Honour was formed from the four Territorial battalions. The battalion's World War I casualties are listed on the roll of honour in the Royal Fusiliers' Regimental Chapel in St Sepulchre-without-Newgate in Holborn.

The regimental colours of the 1st Londons presented at Windsor Castle on 19 June 1909 are in the Church of St Peter ad Vincula in the Tower of London. The King's colour of the 2/1st Londons presented in 1918 is in the Officers' Mess at the Army Reserve Centre in Balham High Road, and that of the 3/1st is in St Sepulchre's.
