= Daniel Lysons (British Army officer) =

British Army general

General Sir Daniel Lysons GCB
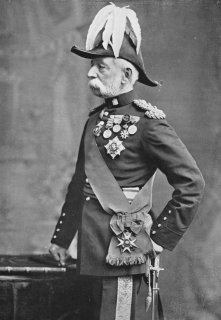
- Born: 1 August 1816
- Died: 29 January 1898 (aged 81)
- Military career
- Allegiance: United Kingdom
- Branch: British Army
- Rank: General
- Commands: 2nd Brigade of the Light Division; Aldershot Division; Northern District
- Conflicts: Crimean War
- Awards: Knight Grand Cross of the Order of the Bath

General Sir Daniel Lysons GCB (1 August 1816 – 29 January 1898) was a British Army general who achieved high office in the 1870s.

== Military career ==
The son of Daniel Lysons the topographer, he was educated at Shrewsbury School. He was commissioned into the 1st Regiment of Foot in 1834. He was shipwrecked on The Premier in the Gulf of Saint Lawrence in 1840 and sought help to rescue many of his comrades. He transferred to the 23rd (Welsh) Fusiliers in 1844.

Lysons fought at the Battle of Alma in September 1854 and took command of the 2nd Brigade of the Light Division in October 1855 during the Crimean War.

In 1869 Lysons became general officer commanding for Aldershot District and in 1872 he became GOC for Northern District. In 1876 he was made Quartermaster-General to the Forces. Then from 1880 to 1883 he commanded the Aldershot Division. He retired in 1883.

Lysons was appointed honorary colonel of the 10th Middlesex Rifle Volunteer Corps (later 1st Volunteer Battalion, Royal Fusiliers) on 26 June 1880.

He was appointed to the prestigious position of Constable of the Tower in 1890.

== Family ==
In 1856 he married Harriet Sophia Bridges and together they went on to have four daughters. In 1865 he married Anna Sophia Biscoe Tritton.

== Sources ==
This article incorporates text from a publication now in the public domain: Lloyd, Ernest Marsh (1901). "Lysons, Daniel (1816-1898)". In Lee, Sidney (ed.). Dictionary of National Biography (1st supplement). London: Smith, Elder & Co.

Military offices
Preceded by George Carey	GOC Northern District; 1872–1874	Succeeded by Sir Henry de Bathe
Preceded by Sir Charles Ellice	Quartermaster-General to the Forces; 1876–1880	Succeeded by Sir Garnet Wolseley
Preceded by Sir Thomas Steele	GOC-in-C Aldershot Command; 1880–1883	Succeeded by Sir Archibald Alison
Honorary titles
Preceded by Lord Napier	Constable of the Tower of London; 1890–1898	Succeeded by Sir Frederick Stephenson
