= Yeomanry House, Bloomsbury =

Yeomanry House
- Bloomsbury, London
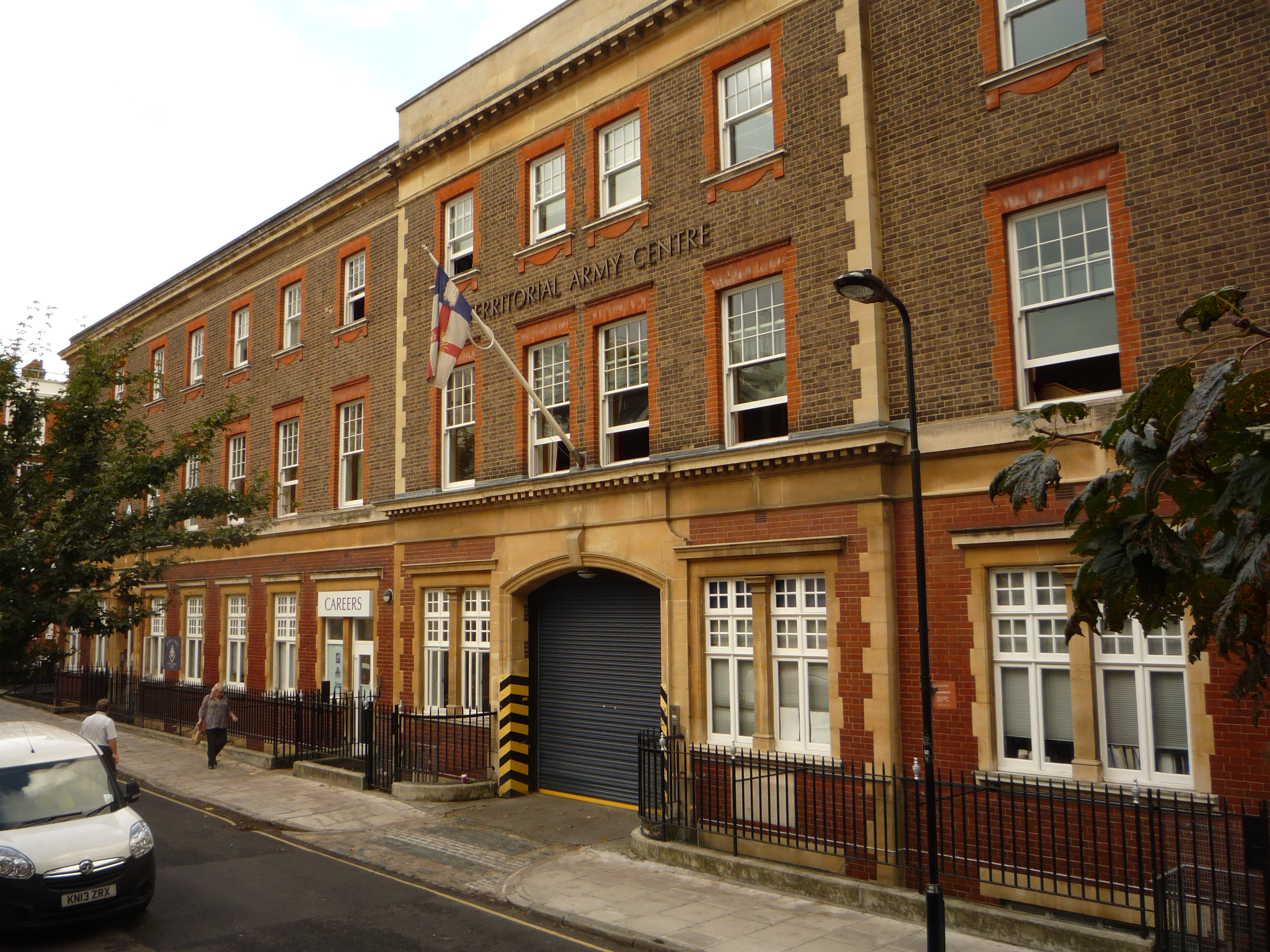
- Yeomanry House

Site information
- Type: Drill Hall
- Owner: Ministry of Defence
- Operator: British Army

Location
- Location within London
- Coordinates: 51.52578°N 0.12299°W

Site history
- Built: 1913
- Built for: War Office
- In use: 1913-Present

Garrison information
- Occupants: London University Officers' Training Corps

Yeomanry House is a drill hall used by the London University Officer Training Corps in Handel Street, Bloomsbury, London.

== History ==
The building was designed as offices for the Territorial Force Association and completed in 1913. The building has two halls and is therefore designed to accommodate two military units, typically a cavalry or infantry regiment in one hall and an artillery regiment in the other hall. In early 1914 the cavalry / infantry hall became the headquarters of the 1st (City of London) Battalion, London Regiment (Royal Fusiliers) and the artillery hall became the headquarters of the 1st City of London Brigade Royal Field Artillery. The 1st (City of London) Battalion was mobilised at the drill hall in August 1914 and was deployed on railway guarding duties before sailing for Malta and, ultimately, for the Western Front.

By 1936 the London Brigade of the Royal Field Artillery had been replaced by the 90th Field Brigade Royal Artillery in the artillery hall. When the London Regiment was broken up and the battalions reallocated to other units in August 1937, the cavalry / infantry hall became the home of the 8th (1st City of London) Battalion The Royal Fusiliers (City of London Regiment). In December 1946 the 8th (1st City of London) Battalion was placed in suspended animation and the cavalry / infantry hall fell vacant.

In 1947 the City of London Yeomanry (Rough Riders) occupied the cavalry / infantry hall which became known as "Yeomanry House". At the same time there was a re-organisation in the Royal Artillery, and 240 Field Regiment (City of London) Royal Artillery occupied the artillery hall, by then known as "Artillery House". The whole complex was taken over by 3 Military Intelligence Battalion in 1965 and by London University Officers' Training Corps in 1992.
