= Harmignies =

Sub-municipality of the city of Mons, Belgium

Harmignies Armégnî (Walloon)
- Sub-municipality of Mons
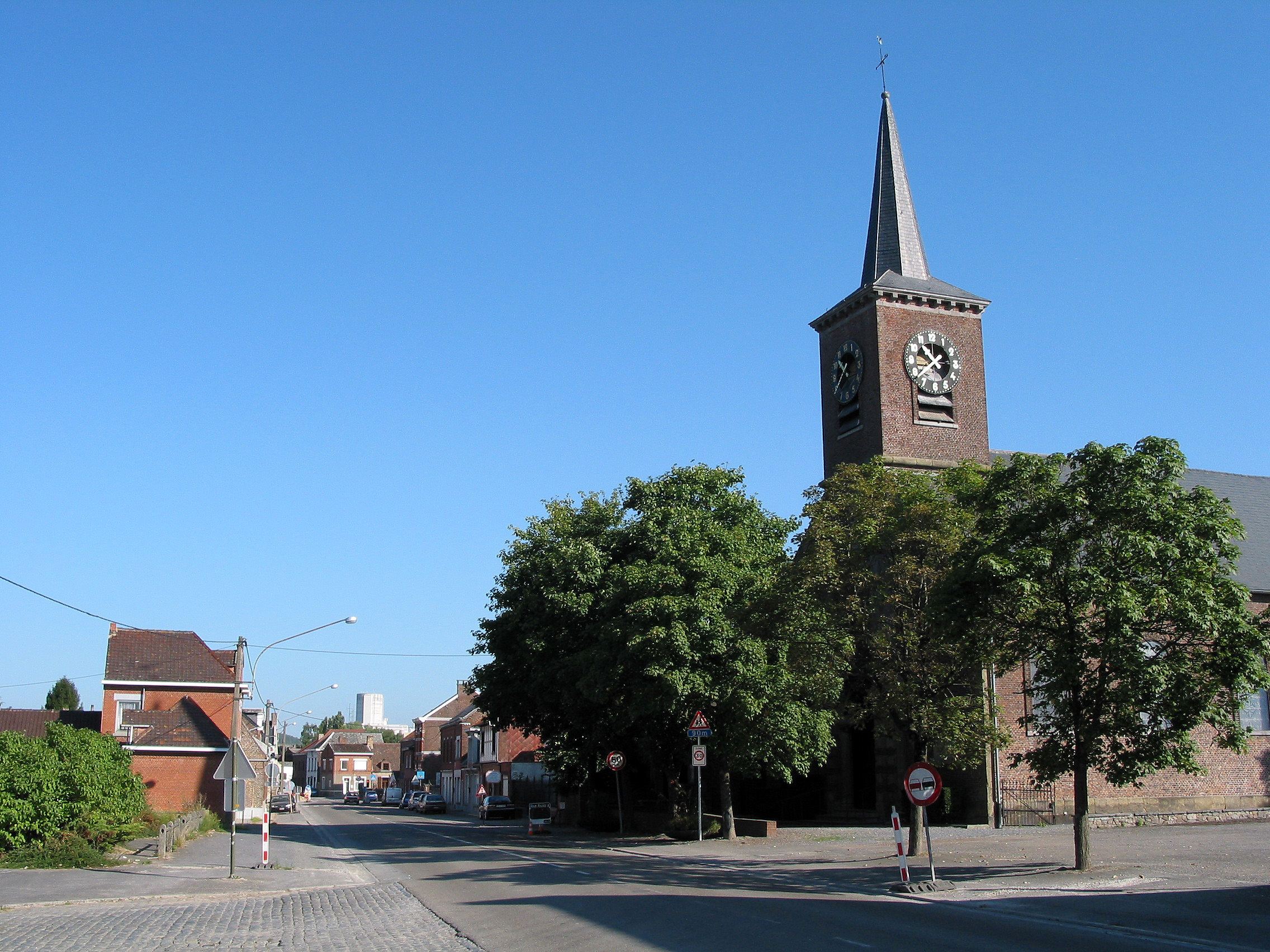

- Coat of arms

- Location of Harmignies in Mons
- Interactive map of Harmignies
- Location within Belgium Location within Hainaut (Belgium)
- Coordinates: 50°24′28″N 4°01′04″E
- Country: Belgium
- Community: French Community
- Region: Wallonia
- Province: Hainaut
- Arrondissement: Mons
- Municipality: Mons

Area
  - Total: 11.12 km^{2} (4.29 sq mi)

Population (2020-01-01)
  - Total: 835
  - Density: 75.1/km^{2} (194/sq mi)
- Postal codes: 7022
- Area codes: 065

Harmignies (French pronunciation: [aʁmiɲi]; Walloon: Armégnî) is a sub-municipality of the city of Mons located in the province of Hainaut, Wallonia, Belgium. It was a separate municipality until 1977. On 1 January 1977, it was merged into Mons.

== Gallery ==
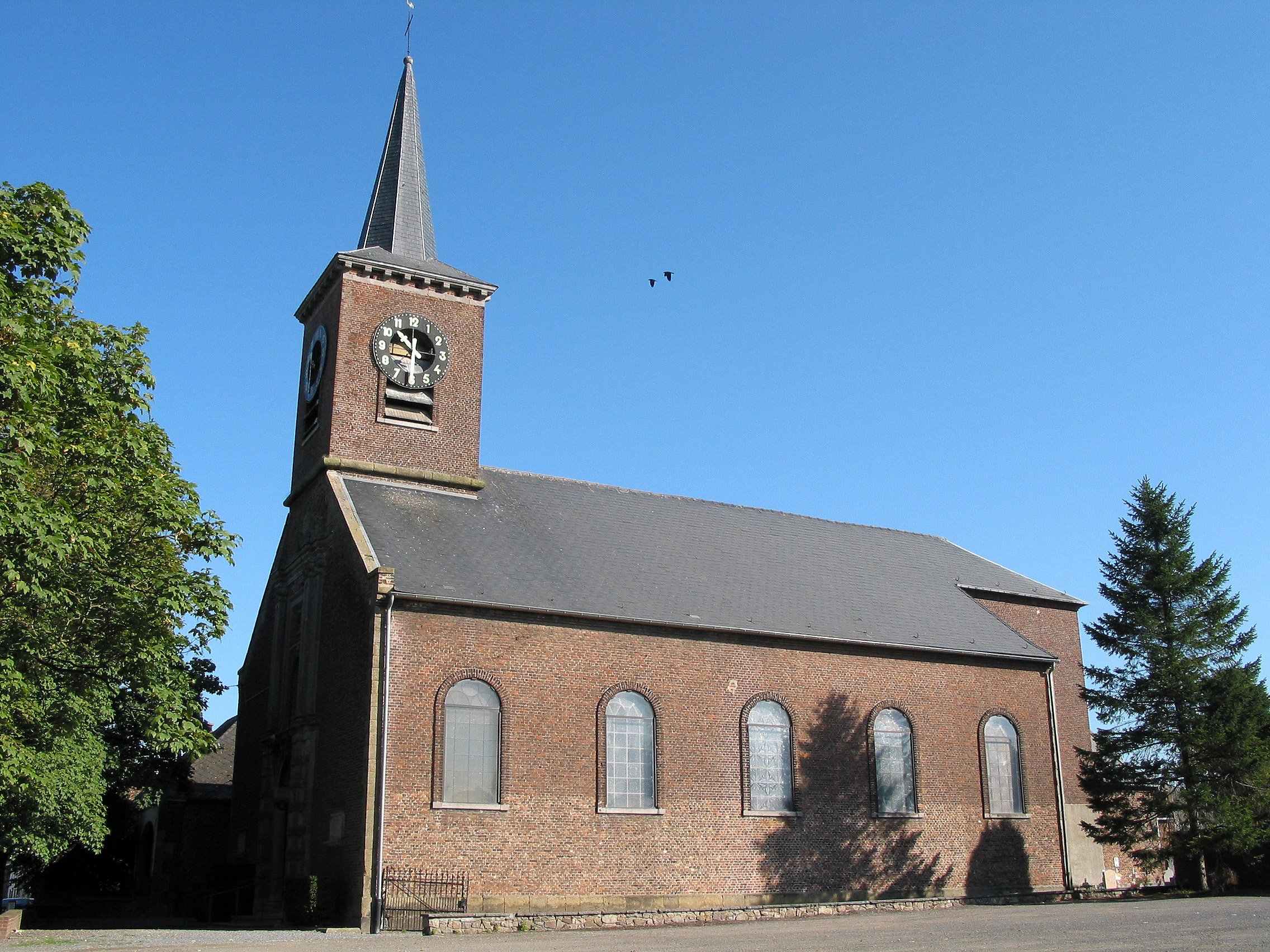
Church Saint-Ghislain.

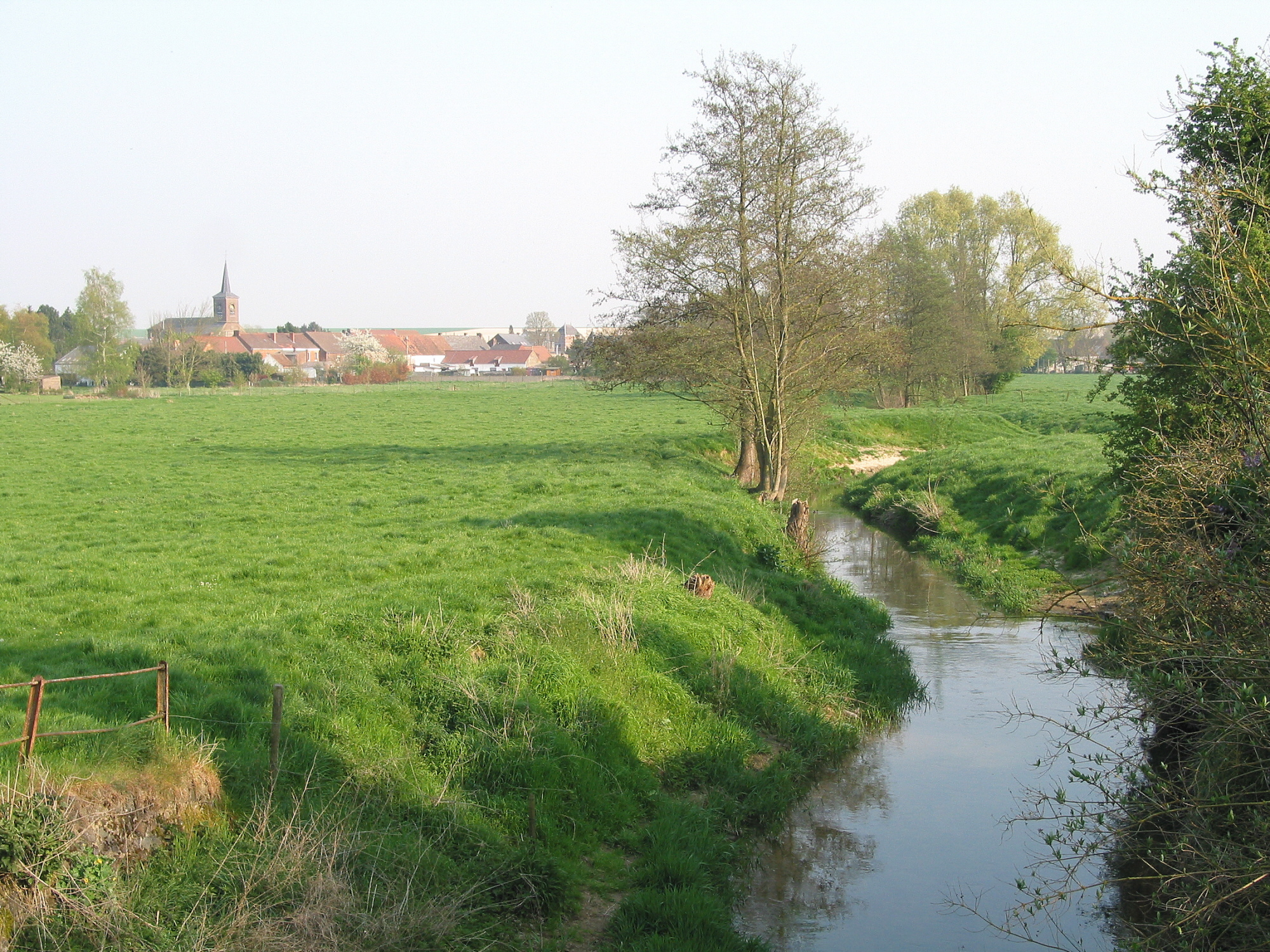
Village and river Trouille.
