= SS Transylvania =

SS Transylvania may refer to:

- SS Transylvania (1914), an ocean liner sunk by German submarine U-63 on 4 May 1917 while serving as a troopship
- RMS Transylvania (1925), an ocean liner torpedoed by U-56 on 10 August 1940; sank from damage while under tow
