= List of Royal Armoured Corps Regiments in World War II =

This is a list of regiments within the British Army's Royal Armoured Corps during the Second World War.

On the creation of the corps in 1939, just before the outbreak of the Second World War, it comprised those regular cavalry and Territorial Army Yeomanry regiments that had been mechanised, together with the Royal Tank Regiment. As the war progressed and further horsed regiments were mechanised, they joined the corps, together with new (armoured) cavalry regiments that were raised for the hostilities. The RAC created its own training and support regiments, and in 1941 and 1942 a number of infantry battalions were converted to armoured regiments and joined the RAC. Lastly, the RAC subsumed the Reconnaissance Corps in 1944.

In the list below, the date refers to the date when the regiment joined the RAC.

== Cavalry ==
=== Regular ===
1939

- 1st King's Dragoon Guards
- 2nd Dragoon Guards (Queen's Bays)
- 3rd Carabiniers (Prince of Wales's Dragoon Guards)
- 4th/7th Royal Dragoon Guards
- 5th Royal Inniskilling Dragoon Guards
- 3rd The King's Own Hussars
- 4th Queen's Own Hussars
- 7th Queen's Own Hussars
- 8th King's Royal Irish Hussars
- 9th Queen's Royal Lancers
- 10th Royal Hussars (Prince of Wales's Own)
- 11th Hussars (Prince Albert's Own)
- 12th Royal Lancers (Prince of Wales's)
- 13th/18th Royal Hussars
- 14th/20th King's Hussars
- 15th/19th The King's Royal Hussars
- 16th/5th Lancers
- 17th/21st Lancers
- 3rd Cavalry Training Regiment – Edinburgh, closed 1940
- 4th Cavalry Training Regiment – Colchester, closed 1940
- 6th Cavalry Training Regiment – Maidstone, closed 1940

1940

- 1st The Royal Dragoons

1941

- Royal Scots Greys

=== Hostilities-only ===
1940

- 22nd Dragoons
- 23rd Hussars
- 24th Lancers

1941

- 25th Dragoons
- 26th Hussars
- 27th Lancers

== Supplementary Reserve ==
1939

- North Irish Horse

== Yeomanry ==
1939

- 1st Derbyshire Yeomanry
- 2nd Derbyshire Yeomanry
- 1st Royal Gloucestershire Hussars
- 2nd Royal Gloucestershire Hussars
- 1st Lothians and Border Yeomanry
- 2nd Lothians and Border Horse
- 1st Fife and Forfar Yeomanry
- 2nd Fife and Forfar Yeomanry
- 3rd County of London Yeomanry (Sharpshooters)
- 4th County of London Yeomanry (Sharpshooters)
- 1st Northamptonshire Yeomanry
- 2nd Northamptonshire Yeomanry
- 1st East Riding Yeomanry
- 2nd East Riding Yeomanry

1940

- Inns of Court Regiment
- Westminster Dragoons (2nd County of London Yeomanry)

1941

- Royal Wiltshire Yeomanry
- Warwickshire Yeomanry
- Yorkshire Hussars
- Sherwood Rangers Yeomanry
- Staffordshire Yeomanry
- Cheshire Yeomanry
- North Somerset Yeomanry

1944

- Queen's Own Yorkshire Dragoons

== Royal Tank Regiment ==
Royal Tank Regiment nomenclature during the Second World War: the regiments were referred to as battalions and used Bn in the title. Post-war Bn was dropped and titles used Royal Tank Regiment without Bn.

=== Regular ===
- 1st Bn, Royal Tank Regiment
- 2nd Bn, Royal Tank Regiment
- 3rd Bn, Royal Tank Regiment
- 4th Bn, Royal Tank Regiment
- 5th Bn, Royal Tank Regiment
- 6th Bn, Royal Tank Regiment
- 7th Bn, Royal Tank Regiment
- 8th Bn, Royal Tank Regiment

=== Hostilities-only ===
- 9th Bn, Royal Tank Regiment
- 10th Bn, Royal Tank Regiment
- 11th Bn, Royal Tank Regiment
- 12th Bn, Royal Tank Regiment

=== Dummy tanks ===
The following "regiments" were formed to construct and move dummy tanks. These were intended to deceive the enemy as to the disposition and strength of British armour. The 3rd Royal Gloucestershire Hussars and the 4th Northamptonshire Yeomanry were formed in a similar manner.

- 37th Bn, Royal Tank Regiment (Dummy tanks)
- 38th Bn, Royal Tank Regiment (Dummy tanks)
- 39th Bn, Royal Tank Regiment (Dummy tanks)
- 60th Bn, Royal Tank Regiment (Dummy tanks)
- 62nd Bn, Royal Tank Regiment (Dummy tanks)
- 65th Bn, Royal Tank Regiment (Dummy tanks)
- 101st Bn, Royal Tank Regiment (Dummy tanks)
- 102nd Bn, Royal Tank Regiment (Dummy tanks)
- 118th Bn, Royal Tank Regiment (Dummy tanks)
- 124th Bn, Royal Tank Regiment (Dummy tanks)

=== Territorial ===
- 40th (The King's) Bn, Royal Tank Regiment converted from 7th Battalion, King's Regiment (Liverpool)
- 41st (Oldham) Bn, Royal Tank Regiment converted from 10th Battalion, Manchester Regiment
- 42nd Royal Tank Regiment (7th (23rd London) Battalion, East Surrey Regiment) Bn, Royal Tank Regiment converted from 7th Battalion, East Surrey Regiment
- 43rd Royal Tank Regiment (6th (City) Battalion, Royal Northumberland Fusiliers) Bn, Royal Tank Regiment converted from 6th Battalion, Royal Northumberland Fusiliers
- 44th Bn, Royal Tank Regiment converted from 6th Battalion, Gloucestershire Regiment
- 45th (Leeds Rifles) Bn, Royal Tank Regiment converted from 7th Battalion, West Yorkshire Regiment
- 46th (Liverpool Welsh) Bn, Royal Tank Regiment duplicate of 40th RTR
- 47th (Oldham) Bn, Royal Tank Regiment duplicate of 41st RTR
- 48th Bn, Royal Tank Regiment duplicate of 42nd RTR
- 49th Bn, Royal Tank Regiment duplicate of 43rd RTR
- 50th Bn, Royal Tank Regiment duplicate of 44th RTR
- 51st (Leeds Rifles) Bn, Royal Tank Regiment duplicate of 45th RTR

== RAC regiments ==
- 1st Armoured Delivery Regiment RAC
- 1st Armoured Reinforcement Regiment RAC
- 2nd Armoured Delivery Regiment RAC
- 21st Training Regiment RAC – 1944–45
- 51st Training Regiment RAC – Cavalry Depot, Catterick, closed 1945
- 52nd Training Regiment RAC – RTR Depot, Bovington, closed 1945
- 53rd Training Regiment RAC – Tidworth, closed 1945
- 54th Training Regiment RAC – Perham Down (Barnard Castle from 1943)
- 55th Training Regiment RAC – Farnborough, closed 1945
- 56th Training Regiment RAC – Catterick, closed 1945
- 57th Training Regiment RAC – Warminster (Catterick from 1943)
- 58th (Young Soldiers) Training Regiment RAC – Bovington, closed 1945
- 59th Training Regiment RAC – Armoured Cars, Tidworth
- 60th Training Regiment RAC – Tidworth, closed 1945
- 61st Training Regiment RAC – Tidworth
- 62nd Training Regiment RAC – Recce Training Centre, Catterick
- 200th Armoured Delivery Regiment RAC

=== RAC regiments converted from infantry ===
All personnel in these units wore the black RAC beret with their own infantry regimental badge.

1941

- 107th Regiment RAC (King's Own) from 5th Battalion, King's Own Royal Regiment (Lancaster)
- 108th Regiment RAC (Lancashire Fusiliers) from 1/5th Battalion, Lancashire Fusiliers
- 109th Regiment RAC (Lancashire Fusiliers) from 1/6th Battalion, Lancashire Fusiliers
- 110th Regiment RAC (Border Regiment) from 5th Battalion, Border Regiment
- 111th Regiment RAC (Manchester Regiment) from 5th Battalion, Manchester Regiment
- 112th Regiment RAC (Foresters) from 9th Battalion, Sherwood Foresters – armoured cars
- 141st Regiment RAC from 7th Battalion, Buffs (Royal East Kent Regiment)
- 142nd (Suffolk) Regiment RAC from 7th Battalion, Suffolk Regiment
- 143rd Regiment RAC (Lancashire Fusiliers) from 9th Battalion, Lancashire Fusiliers
- 144th Regiment RAC from 8th Battalion, East Lancashire Regiment
- 145th Regiment RAC (8DWR) from 8th Battalion, Duke of Wellington's Regiment
- 146th Regiment RAC from 9th Battalion, Duke of Wellington's Regiment
- 147th Regiment RAC from 10th Battalion, Hampshire Regiment
- 148th Regiment RAC from 9th Battalion, Loyal Regiment (North Lancashire)
- 149th Regiment RAC from 7th Battalion, King's Own Yorkshire Light Infantry
- 150th Regiment RAC from 10th Battalion, York and Lancaster Regiment
- 151st Regiment RAC from 10th Battalion, King's Own Royal Regiment (Lancaster)
- 152nd Regiment RAC from 11th Battalion, King's Regiment (Liverpool)
- 153rd Regiment RAC from 8th Battalion, Essex Regiment

1942

- 113th Regiment RAC from 2/5th Battalion, West Yorkshire Regiment
- 114th Regiment RAC from 2/6th Battalion, Duke of Wellington's Regiment
- 115th Regiment RAC from 2/7th Battalion, Duke of Wellington's Regiment
- 116th Regiment RAC from 9th Battalion, Gordon Highlanders
- 154th Regiment RAC from 9th Battalion, North Staffordshire Regiment
- 155th Regiment RAC from 15th Battalion, Durham Light Infantry
- 156th Regiment RAC from 11th Battalion, Highland Light Infantry
- 157th Regiment RAC from 9th Battalion, Hampshire Regiment
- 158th Regiment RAC from 6th Battalion, South Wales Borderers
- 159th Regiment RAC from 10th Battalion, Gloucestershire Regiment
- 160th Regiment RAC from 9th Battalion, Royal Sussex Regiment
- 161st Regiment RAC from 12th Battalion, Green Howards
- 162nd Regiment RAC from 9th Battalion, Queen's Own Royal West Kent Regiment
- 163rd Regiment RAC from 13th Battalion, Sherwood Foresters

1943

- 1st Scorpion Regiment RAC (equipped with Scorpion flail tanks) converted from 41st Royal Tank Regiment; became 1st Assault (Engineer) Regiment, Royal Engineers 1944 and thus left the RAC.

1944

- 49th Armoured Personnel Carrier Regiment (equipped with Kangaroo APCs) converted from 49th Royal Tank Regiment

== Reconnaissance regiments ==
The Reconnaissance Regiments had mainly been formed in 1941–3 from infantry battalions and/or brigade anti-tank companies. They usually took their numbers from the infantry divisions in which they were formed, but retained them if transferred to another division. Some had been disbanded before transfer to the RAC in 1944, some had been converted from RAC regiments and consequently returned to the corps in 1944.

- 1st Reconnaissance Regiment RAC
- 2nd Reconnaissance Regiment RAC
- 3rd (Royal Northumberland Fusiliers) Reconnaissance Regiment RAC
- 4th Reconnaissance Regiment RAC
- 5th Reconnaissance Regiment RAC
- 15th (Scottish) Reconnaissance Regiment RAC
- 18th Reconnaissance Regiment RAC
- 38th (Welsh) Reconnaissance Regiment RAC
- 43rd (Wessex) Reconnaissance Regiment (The Gloucestershire Regiment) RAC
- 44th Reconnaissance Regiment RAC
- 45th Reconnaissance Regiment RAC
- 46th Reconnaissance Regiment RAC
- 48th Reconnaissance Regiment RAC
- 49th (West Riding) Reconnaissance Regiment RAC
- 50th Reconnaissance Regiment RAC
- 51st Reconnaissance Regiment RAC
- 52nd (Lowland) Reconnaissance Regiment RAC
- 53rd (Welsh) Reconnaissance Regiment RAC
- 54th Reconnaissance Regiment RAC
- 56th Reconnaissance Regiment RAC
- 59th Reconnaissance Regiment RAC
- 61st Reconnaissance Regiment RAC
- 63rd Reconnaissance Training Centre (became 62nd Training Regiment RAC)
- 80th Reconnaissance Regiment RAC (Holding and training regiment)
- 81st (West African) Reconnaissance Regiment RAC
- 82nd (West African) Reconnaissance Regiment RAC
- 161st (Green Howards) Reconnaissance Regiment RAC (converted from 161st Regiment RAC)
- 1st Airborne Reconnaissance Squadron
- 6th Airborne Armoured Reconnaissance Regiment RAC
- 2nd Derbyshire Yeomanry
- GHQ Liaison Regiment (Phantom)

== See also ==
- British armoured formations of the Second World War
- List of British mobile brigades during the Second World War

== Bibliography ==
- Bellis, Malcolm A. (1994). Regiments of the British Army 1939–1945 (Armour & Infantry). London: Military Press International. ISBN 0-85420-999-9.
- Ellis, L.F. (2004) [1st. Pub. HMSO:1968]. History of the Second World War: United Kingdom Military Series: Victory in the West. Vol. II: The Defeat of Germany. Uckfield: Naval & Military. ISBN 1-845740-59-9.
- Forty, George (1998). British Army Handbook 1939–1945. Stroud, Gloucestershire: Sutton Publishing Limited. ISBN 0-7509-1403-3.
- Joslen, H. F. (2003) [1960]. Orders of Battle: Second World War, 1939–1945. Uckfield, East Sussex: Naval and Military Press. ISBN 978-1-84342-474-1.
- Smith, John A. (2014). British Armoured Formations 1939 - 1945 - A Bibliography. Woking: TankFactory. ISBN 978-0-9930228-0-7.
