= Structure of Aldershot Command in 1939 =

British units during WW2

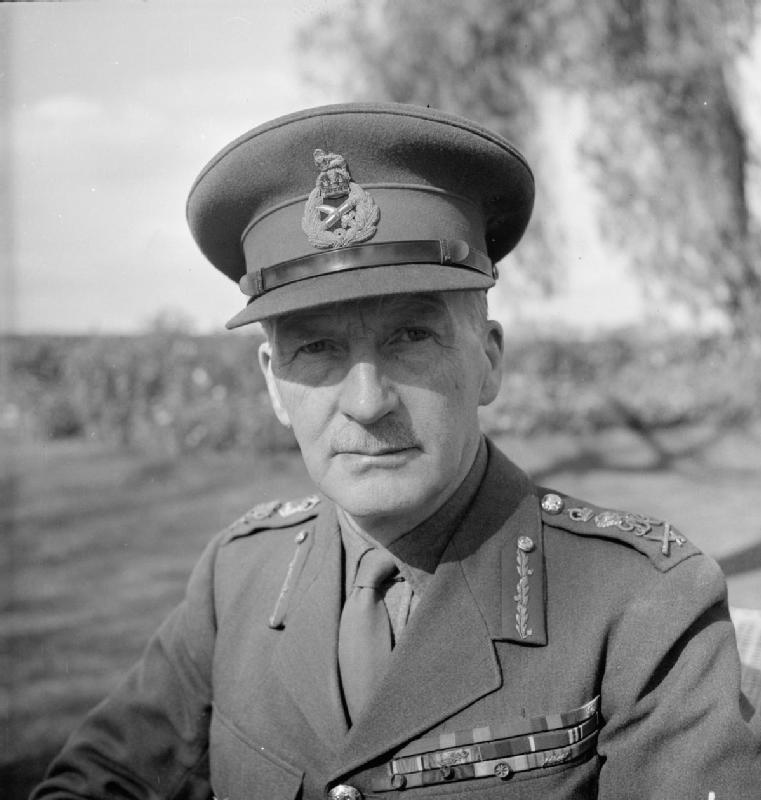
Lieutenant-General John Dill, who was in charge of Aldershot Command on the outbreak of the war.

Aldershot Command was a formation of the British Army at the start of the Second World War in September 1939.

On the outbreak of the war, the General Officer Commanding, Aldershot Command was Lieutenant-General Sir John Dill. Within the British Army's hierarchy, the command's general officer commanding would receive orders from General Headquarters, Home Forces and would then disseminate those instructions to the units under its charge. In the event of an invasion of the UK, it was intended that each command could form the basis for a field army. However, on the outbreak of the war, Aldershot Command was used to form I Corps and then became responsible for providing drafts for British Expeditionary Force. Following defeat during the Battle of France, the British Army reorganised their forces based in the UK. For Aldershot Command, this resulted in being downgraded into Aldershot Area within the new South Eastern Command on 15 February 1941. The new formation was formed by the splitting of Eastern Command and absorbing Aldershot's geographical area.

== Aldershot Command, outbreak of the Second World War, September 1939 ==
Headquarters : Aldershot
Commander-in-Chief: Lieutenant General Sir John Dill
Brigadier, General Staff: Brigadier Arthur Percival

=== Services ===
Royal Army Medical Corps (location for units not identified)

- 1st and 2nd Companies
- A, B, and C Companies (Depot)

Royal Army Ordnance Corps (location for units not identified)

- No. 1 and No. 5 Section

Royal Army Pay Corps

- Detachment at Aldershot
- Detachment at Woking

Royal Army Veterinary Corps

- Detachment at Camberley

=== Independent brigades ===
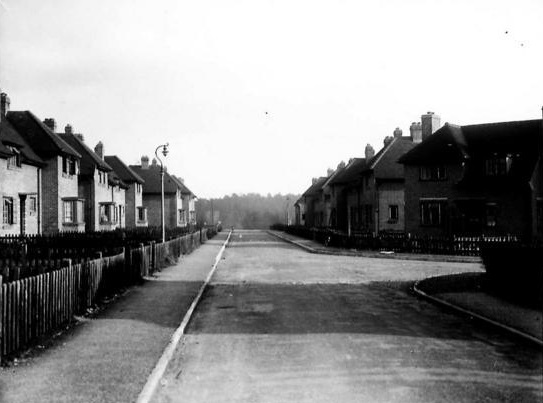
Married quarters at Blackdown

Army Tank Brigade (headquartered at Aldershot) (Note: At the start of the war, the Royal Tank Regiment utilized 'infantry' terminology and called their units battalions. In May 1940, the Royal Armoured Corps (the parent organisation that administered all armoured units) standardised nomenclature around the 'cavalry' tradition and thereafter, the term battalion was dropped, and the units were then known only as regiments.)

- 4th Battalion, Royal Tank Regiment
- 7th Battalion, Royal Tank Regiment
- 8th Battalion, Royal Tank Regiment

1st Anti-Aircraft Brigade (headquartered at Blackdown)

- 6th Anti-Aircraft Regiment, Royal Artillery
  - 3rd, 12th, and 15th Anti-Aircraft Batteries
  - 1st Light Anti-Aircraft Battery
- 1st Anti-Aircraft Battalion, Royal Engineers
- 1st Anti-Aircraft Brigade Signals, Royal Corps of Signals
- 2nd Anti-Aircraft Brigade Signals, Royal Corps of Signals

=== 1st Infantry Division ===
1st Infantry Division (headquartered at Aldershot)

1st Infantry Brigade (Guards) (headquartered at Aldershot)

- 3rd Battalion, Grenadier Guards
- 2nd Battalion, Coldstream Guards
- 2nd Battalion, Hampshire Regiment
- Brigade Anti-tank Company

2nd Infantry Brigade (headquartered at Aldershot)

- 1st Battalion, Loyal Regiment (North Lancashire)
- 2nd Battalion, North Staffordshire Regiment
- 1st Battalion, Gordon Highlanders
- Brigade Anti-tank Company

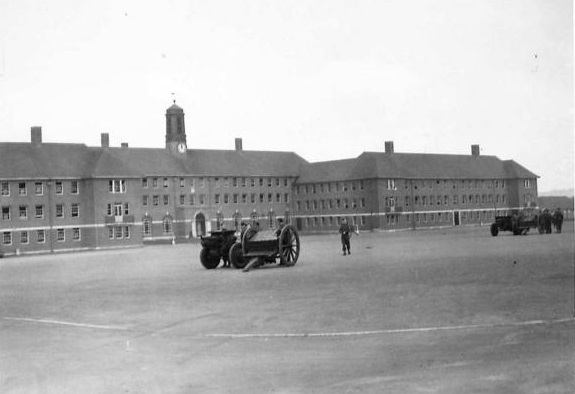
Sandhurst Block of the barracks at Bordon

3rd Infantry Brigade (headquartered at Bordon)

- 1st Battalion, Duke of Wellington's Regiment
- 2nd Battalion, Sherwood Foresters
- 1st Battalion, King's Shropshire Light Infantry
- Brigade Anti-tank Company

Divisional Troops

- Divisional artillery, Royal Artillery
  - 2nd Field Regiment (Bordon)
  - 19th Field Regiment (Bordon)
  - 24th Field Regiment (Aldershot)
  - 21st Anti-Tank Regiment (location not identified)
- Divisional engineers, Royal Engineers (all at Aldershot)
  - 17th Field Company
  - 23rd Field Company
  - 26th Field Company
  - 6th Field Park Company
- Divisional Signals, Royal Corps of Signals (Aldershot)
- Divisional reconnaissance
  - 13th/18th Royal Hussars (Shorncliffe Army Camp)
- Royal Army Service Corps
  - 7th, 40th, and 42nd Companies (Aldershot)
- Corps of Military Police
  - No. 1 Company (location not listed)

=== 2nd Infantry Division ===
2nd Infantry Division (headquartered at Aldershot)

4th Infantry Brigade (Aldershot)

- 1st Battalion, Royal Scots
- 2nd Battalion, Royal Norfolk Regiment
- 1st Battalion, Border Regiment
- Brigade Anti-Tank Company

5th Infantry Brigade (Aldershot)

- 2nd Battalion, Royal Warwickshire Regiment
- 2nd Battalion, Dorsetshire Regiment
- 1st Battalion, Queen's Own Cameron Highlanders
- Brigade Anti-Tank Company

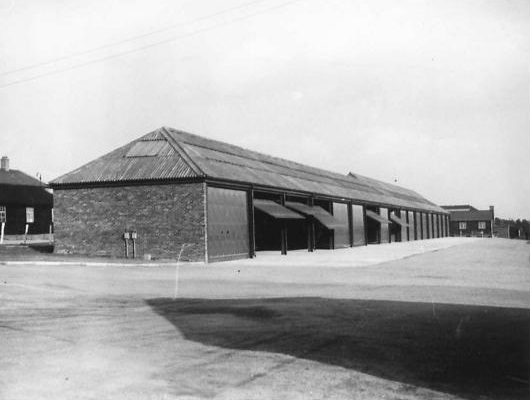
Vehicle garage at Deepcut

6th Infantry Brigade (Blackdown)

- 1st Battalion, Royal Welch Fusiliers
- 1st Battalion, Royal Berkshire Regiment
- 2nd Battalion, Durham Light Infantry (Woking)
- Brigade Anti-Tank Company

Divisional Troops:

- Divisional artillery, Royal Artillery
  - 10th Field Regiment (Deepcut Barracks)
  - 16th Field Regiment (Ewshot)
  - 18th Field Regiment (Deepcut)
- Divisional engineers, Royal Engineers (all at Aldershot)
  - 5th Field Company
  - 11th Field Company
  - 38th Field Company
  - 21st Field Park Company
- Divisional Signals, Royal Corps of Signals (Aldershot)
- Divisional reconnaissance
  - 4th/7th Royal Dragoon Guards (Aldershot)
- Royal Army Service Corps
  - 8th, 24th, and 29th Companies (Aldershot)
- Corps of Military Police
  - No. 1 and 2 Companies (location not listed)

=== Other troops assigned directly to the command ===
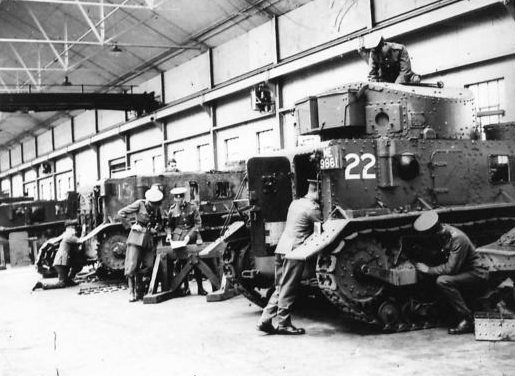
A tank repair workshop in Aldershot

Royal Armoured Corps

- 1st King's Dragoon Guards (assigned to the Mobile Division under Southern Command)
- 12th (Prince of Wales's) Royal Lancers (Aldershot)
- 2nd Battalion, Royal Tank Regiment (Farnborough)
- Mechanised Experimental Establishment (Farnborough)

Royal Artillery

- 2nd Medium Regiment (Longmoor)
- 13th Anti-Tank Regiment (Aldershot)
- 21st Anti-Tank Regiment (Aldershot)
- 5th Anti-Aircraft Depot (Arborfield)
- 6th Anti-Aircraft Depot (Arborfield)

Royal Engineers

- Regimental HQ and Motor Transport Depot (Aldershot)
- 1st Field Squadron (Aldershot)
- 8th (Railway) Company (Longmoor Military Railway)
- 10th (Railway) Company (Longmoor)
- Railway Training Center (Longmoor)

Royal Corps of Signals (all located at Aldershot)

- 'A' Corps Signals
- No. 2 Company, General Headquarters Signals
- No. 1, 3, 6, and 11 Artillery Signals Sections
- 4th Tank Signal Section
- No. 1 Cavalry Armoured Car Regiment Signal Troop

Infantry (Note: Both battalions were located in Aldershot. While they were subordinate to Aldershot Command, they were both administered by brigades of the 1st Infantry Division.)

- 2nd Battalion, Cheshire Regiment
- 2nd Battalion, Manchester Regiment

Royal Army Service Corps

- Training Centre (Aldershot)
- Training Battalion (Aldershot)
- Training Battalion (Crookham)
- 1st, 3rd, 6th, 35th, 41st, 64th, "A", and "C" Companies (Aldershot)
- 9th Company (Bordon)

== See also ==
- Structure of the British Army in 1939

== Notes ==
Footnotes

Citations
