= 44th Royal Tank Regiment =

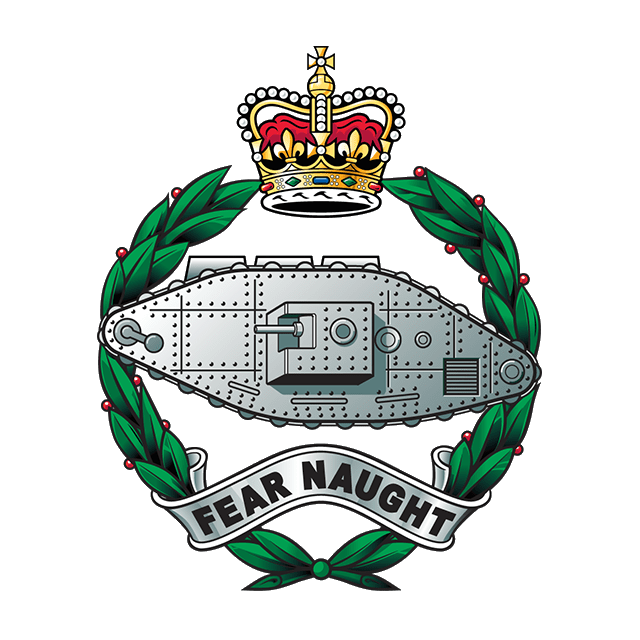
- Cap badge of the Royal Tank Regiment
- Active: 1938 – October 1956
- Country: United Kingdom
- Branch: British Army
- Type: Armoured
- Size: Regiment
- Part of: Royal Armoured Corps
- Motto: Fear Naught
- March: Quick: "My Boy Willie" (all RTR regiments); Slow: "The Royal Tank Regiment Slow March"

Commanders
- Colonel-in-Chief: HM The Queen
- Notable commanders: Gerald Hopkinson

Insignia
- Tactical Recognition Flash

The 44th Royal Tank Regiment (44 RTR) was an armoured regiment of the British Army, which was part of the Royal Tank Regiment, itself part of the Royal Armoured Corps that saw active service in World War II.

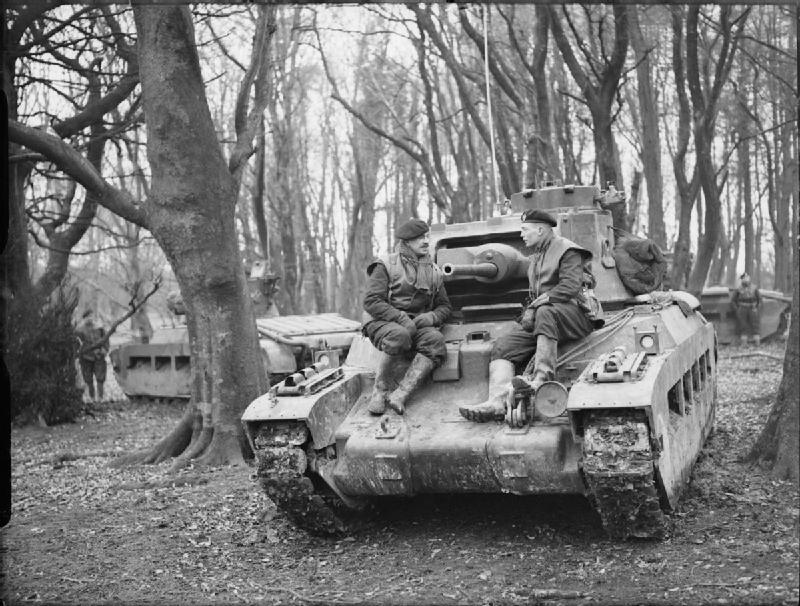
Matilda tanks of 'B' Squadron, 44 RTR on an exercise near Worthing, UK, 31 December 1940

The 44th RTR was formed before World War II in 1938 from the 6th Battalion, Gloucestershire Regiment. When war was declared on 3 September 1939 44th RTR was in Bristol, attached to 21st Army Tank Brigade at the time, with the 42nd and 48th RTR. The battalion then went to the Middle East in April 1941 and by the time of Operation Crusader, November 1941, 1st Army Tank Brigade, equipped with Valentine tanks, along with 8th and 42nd RTR, supporting 2nd New Zealand Division, contributing to the Divisions stand against the German and Italian armoured attacks on 30 November 1941. It was still part of 1st Army Tank Brigade when the Germans and Italians attacked at Gazala in May 1942 and also in the Cauldron battles of that campaign. It then supported the Australians during the withdraw during the 'Gazala Gallop' and again during the First Battle of El Alamein.

It was then withdrawn from the line for re-equipping although a small number of it troops used mine sweeping Matilda (Scorpion) tanks during the Second Battle of El Alamein. In June 1943, the battalion became part of 4th Armoured Brigade for the invasion of Sicily and the also for the brigade's part in the Italian Campaign. It, with the rest of 4th Armoured Brigade, withdrew from Italy in January 1944 to return to the United Kingdom ready for the Normandy landings, where it arrived on 9 June 1944.

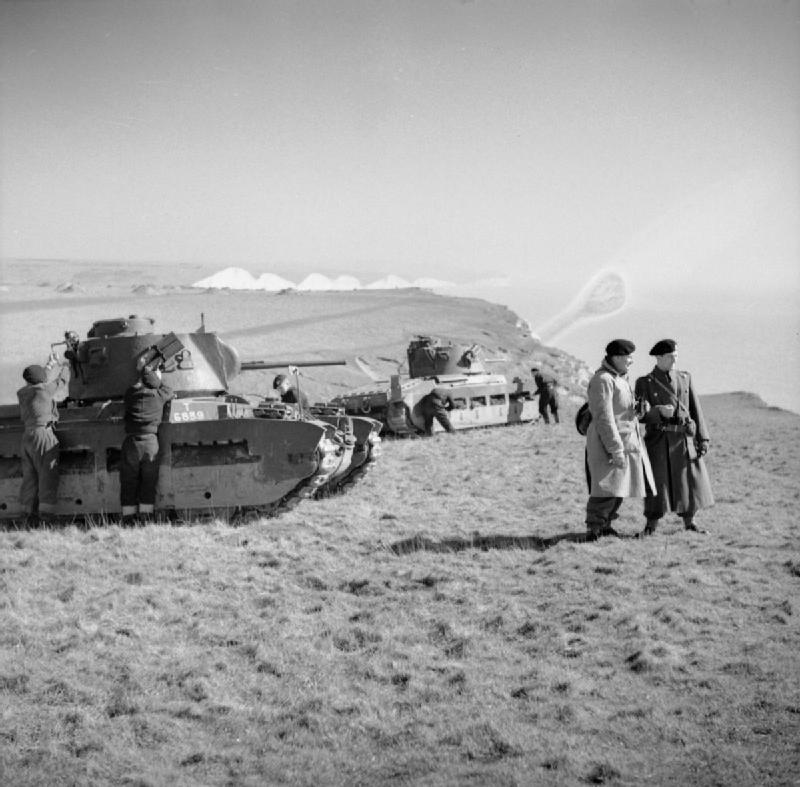
Matilda tanks of 44th Royal Tank Regiment on the clifftops at Seaford Head, Sussex, 15 March 1941.

After the Operation Overlord in Normandy, it took part in the break-out and reached the River Scheldt by 9 September 1944. On 17 September it came under the command of the US 101st Airborne Division as part of Operation Market Garden, before returning to the 4th Armoured Brigade. In April 1945 the regiment helped 52nd (Lowland) Infantry Division in the capture of Bremen. It then moved via Hamburg to begin its occupational role to Uetersen on 9 May 1945.

The regiment was amalgamated with 50th RTR to form 44th/50th RTR and on 31 October 1956, the new regiment was further amalgamated with the North Somerset Yeomanry, to form the North Somerset Yeomanry/44th Royal Tank Regiment, which has since become the North Somerset and Bristol Yeomanry.
