= Royal Tank Regiment =

British Army tank unit

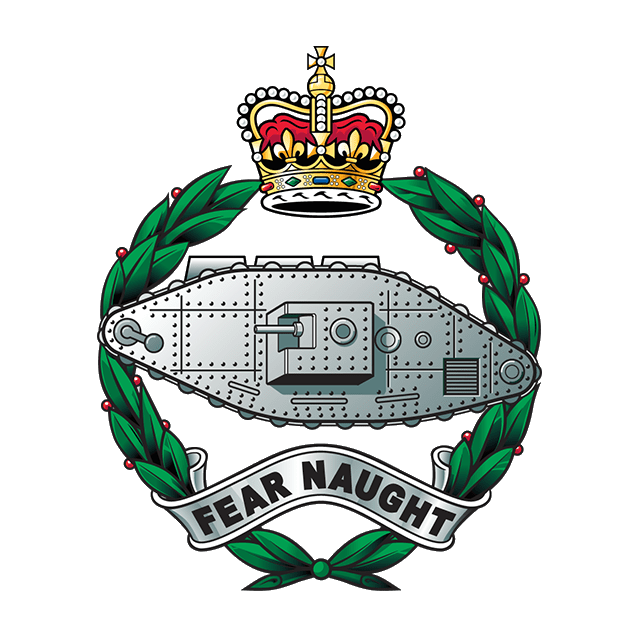
- Cap badge of the Royal Tank Regiment
- Active: 28 July 1917 – present
- Allegiance: United Kingdom
- Branch: British Army
- Type: Armoured
- Role: Tank warfare CBRN reconnaissance
- Size: Regiment
- Part of: 12th Armoured Brigade
- Garrison/HQ: HHQ – Bovington; Regiment – Tidworth
- Motto: Fear Naught
- March: Quick: My Boy Willie; Slow: The Royal Tank Regiment Slow March
- Anniversaries: First World War; *Cambrai, 20 November; Second World War; Korean War; Iraq War
- Battle honours: see Battle Honours

Commanders
- Colonel-in-Chief: King Charles III
- Commanding Officer: Lt Col Lloyd Dukes
- Notable commanders: Lt Gen Sir Hugh Elles; Maj Gen Sir Percy Hobart

Insignia
- Tactical Recognition Flash
- Tartan: Hunting Rose (Pipes and Drums kilts and plaids)
- Arm Badge: Tank
- Abbreviation: RTR

The Royal Tank Regiment (RTR) is the oldest tank unit in the world, being formed by the British Army in 1916 during the First World War. Today, it is an armoured regiment equipped with Challenger 2 main battle tanks and structured under 12th Armoured Brigade.

The regiment started in the First World War with the companies of the Heavy Section of the Machine Gun Corps which were expanded to battalion size and given separate identify as the Tank Corps. At the end of the war, the corps was reduced to four battalions and in 1923 given the "Royal" title. The corps expanded again in the lead up to the Second World War and was renamed the Royal Tank Regiment in 1939; the RTR being one part of the newly created Royal Armoured Corps.

After the Second World War, the number of battalions in the regiment was reduced again by amalgamation. In 1992 the number of battalions was reduced again and in 2014 the last two battalions were merged into a single battalion of six squadrons.

== History ==
=== First World War ===
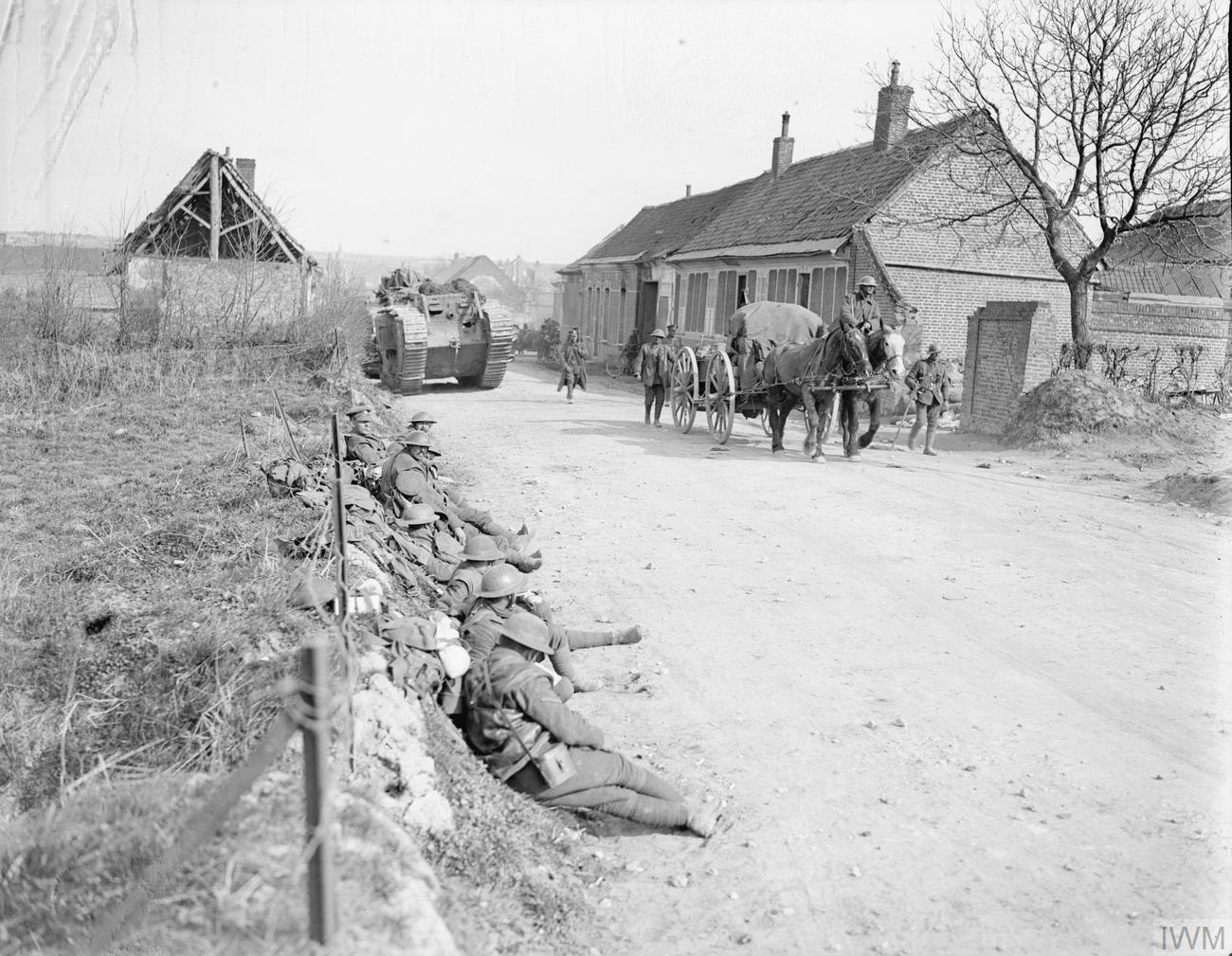
Mark V tanks of the 2nd Tank Battalion halted in Aveluy. Men of a light infantry regiment can be seen resting by the roadside. On the road are also transport limbers. 25 March 1918.

The formation of the Royal Tank Regiment followed the invention of the tank. Tanks were first used at the Battle of Flers–Courcelette in September 1916 during the Battle of the Somme in the First World War. They were at first considered artillery, and crews received artillery pay. At that time the six tank companies were grouped as the Heavy Section of the Machine Gun Corps (MGC). In November 1916 the eight companies then in existence were each expanded to form battalions (still identified by the letters A to H) and designated the Heavy Branch MGC; another seven battalions, I to O, were formed by January 1918, when all the battalions were changed to numbered units. On 28 July 1917, the Heavy Branch was separated from the rest of the Corps by Royal Warrant and given official status as the Tank Corps. The formation of new battalions continued and, by December 1918, 26 had been created though only 25 battalions were equipped with tanks, as the 17th had converted to armoured cars in April 1918. The first commander of the Tank Corps was Hugh Elles. The Corps saw much action at the Battle of Cambrai in November 1917.

=== Interwar period ===
After the war, the Tank Corps was trimmed down to a central depot and four battalions: the 2nd, 3rd, 4th and 5th battalions. On 18 October 1923, it was officially given the title Royal making it the Royal Tank Corps (RTC) by Colonel-in-Chief King George V. It was at this time that the motto, "Fear Naught", the black beret, and the unit badge were adopted. In 1933, the 6th Battalion, RTC was formed in Egypt by combining the personnel of the 3rd and 5th Regular Army Armoured Car Companies. In 1934, the 1st (Light) Battalion, RTC was formed in England with personnel drawn from the 2nd, 3rd & 5th Battalions. With the preparations for war in the late 1930s, two more Regular Army battalions were formed: the 7th in 1937 and the 8th in 1938. In the latter half of 1938, six TA infantry battalions were converted to tank battalions; with a further six created in 1939 following the "duplication" of the TA.

During the early 1920s, the Tank Corps was augmented by 20 armoured car companies: twelve Regular Army, created using MGC elements; and eight Territorial Army (TA) created by the reduction and conversion of Yeomanry regiments. Eight of the Regular Army companies were later converted into independent light tank companies; all twelve companies had been disbanded by the outbreak of the Second World War. By 1939, the battalions were as follows:

Territorial Army Battalions of the Royal Tank Corps
Battalion	Origin
40th (The King's) Battalion, Royal Tank Corps	conversion of 7th Battalion, King's (Liverpool) Regiment
41st (Oldham) Battalion, Royal Tank Corps	conversion of 10th Battalion, Manchester Regiment
42nd (7th (23rd London Regiment) East Surrey Regiment) Battalion, Royal Tank Corps	conversion of 7th (23rd London) Battalion, East Surrey Regiment
43rd (6th (City) Battalion, Royal Northumberland Fusiliers) Battalion, Royal Tank Corps	conversion of 6th Battalion, Royal Northumberland Fusiliers
44th Battalion, Royal Tank Corps	conversion of 6th Battalion, Gloucestershire Regiment
45th (Leeds Rifles) Battalion, Royal Tank Corps	conversion of 7th (Leeds Rifles) Battalion, West Yorkshire Regiment
46th (Liverpool Welsh) Battalion, Royal Tank Corps	duplicate of 40th RTC
47th (Oldham) Battalion, Royal Tank Corps	duplicate of 41st RTC
48th Battalion, Royal Tank Corps	duplicate of 42nd RTC
49th Battalion, Royal Tank Corps	duplicate of 43rd RTC
50th Battalion, Royal Tank Corps	duplicate of 44th RTC
51st (Leeds Rifles) Battalion, Royal Tank Corps	duplicate of 45th RTC

On 4 April 1939, the Royal Tank Corps was renamed the Royal Tank Regiment and became a wing of the newly created Royal Armoured Corps. The eight Yeomanry Armoured Car Companies of the RTR were activated and transferred to the Royal Armoured Corps. Before the Second World War, Royal Tank Corps recruits were required to be at least 5 ft 4 in (1.63 m) tall. They initially enlisted for six years with the colours and a further six years with the reserve. They trained at the Royal Tank Corps Depot at Bovington Camp, Dorset for about eight months.

=== Second World War ===
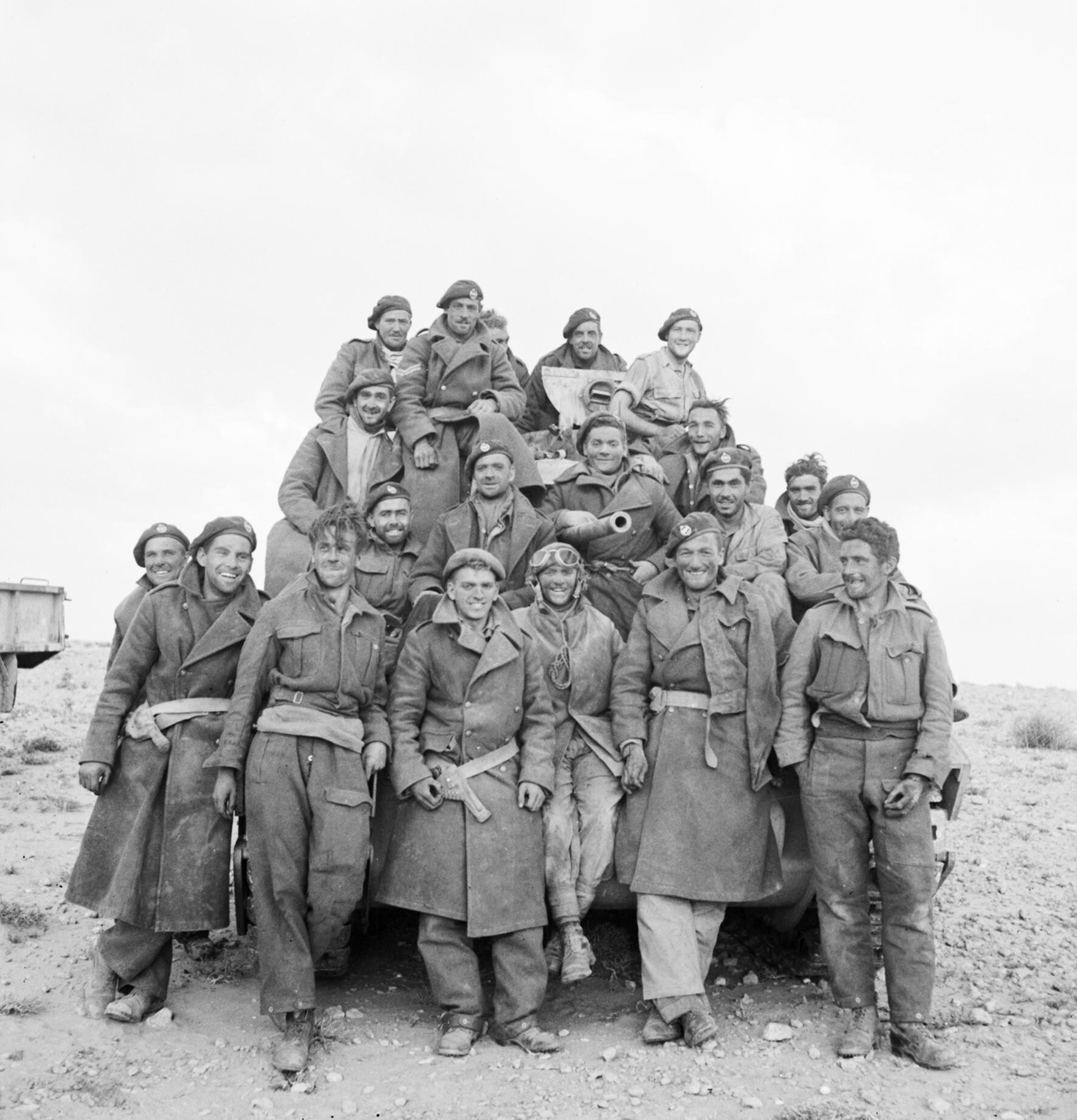
Men of the Royal Tank Regiment in North Africa, 1941.

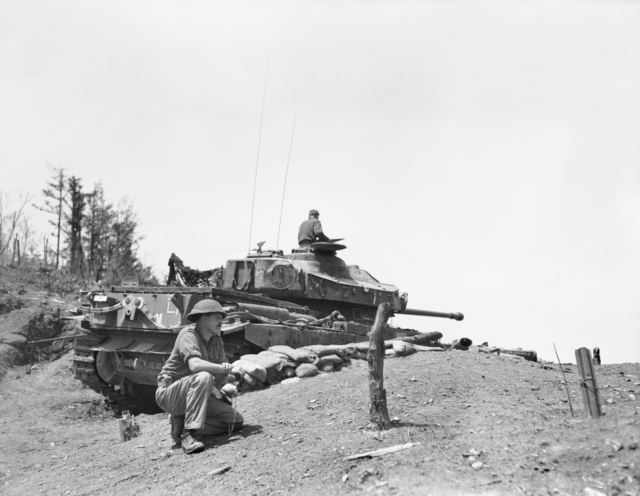
Centurion tank in Korea, May 1953.

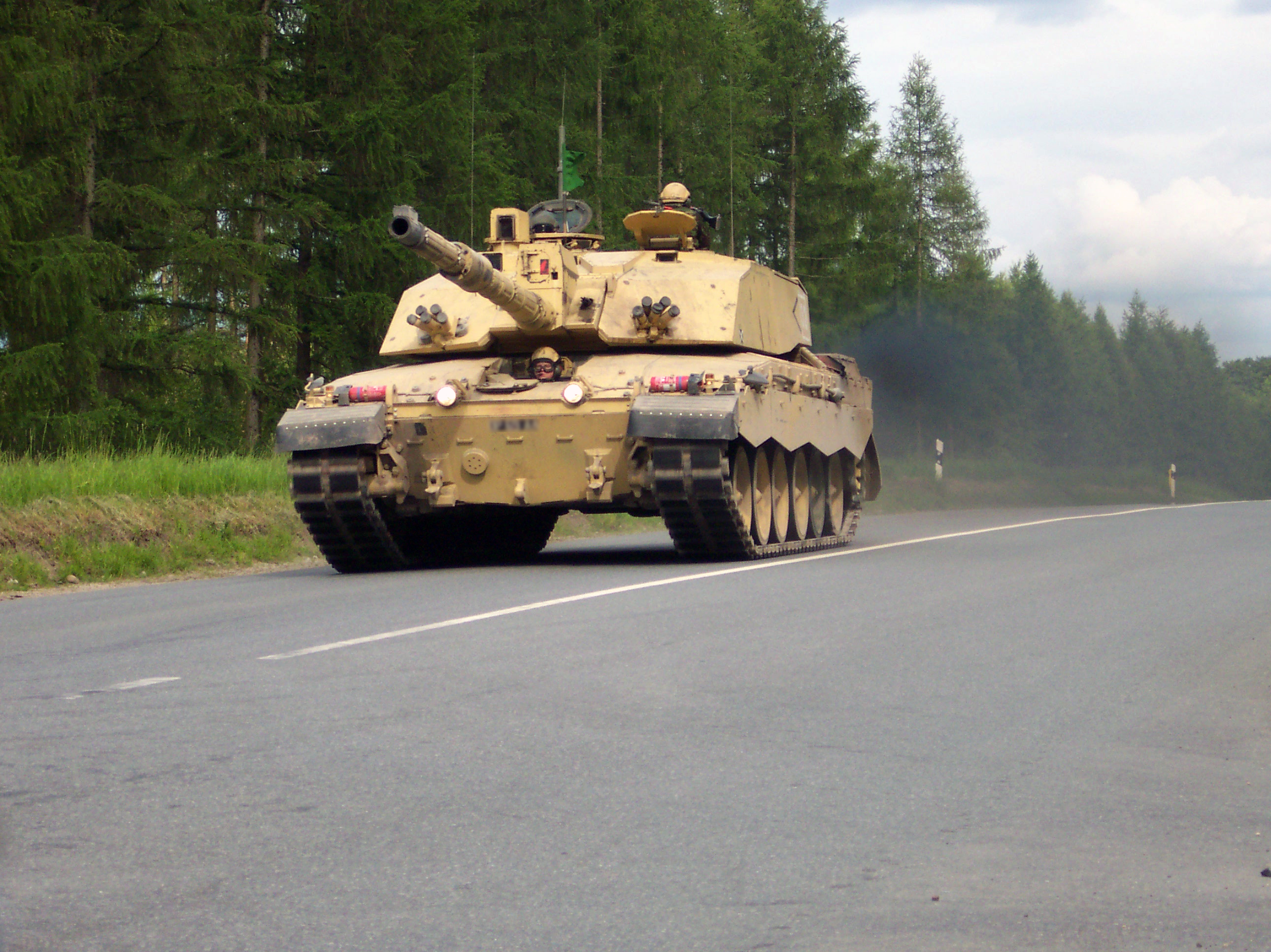
The 2nd Royal Tank Regiment with the Challenger 2 MBT during live-fire training exercises in Germany in 2004.

At the outbreak of war, the regiment consisted of 20 battalions, 8 regular and 12 territorial.

- Regular Army
  - Heavy Armoured Brigade (Egypt): 1st RTR and 6th RTR
  - 1st Heavy Armoured Brigade: 2nd RTR, 3rd RTR and 5th RTR
  - 1st Army Tank Brigade: 4th RTR, 7th RTR and 8th RTR
- Territorial Army
  - 21st Army Tank Brigade: 42nd RTR, 44th RTR and 48th RTR
  - 23rd Army Tank Brigade: 40th RTR, 46th RTR and 50th RTR
  - 24th Army Tank Brigade: 41st RTR, 45th RTR and 47th RTR
  - 25th Army Tank Brigade: 43rd RTR, 49th RTR and 51st RTR

During the course of the war, four "hostilities-only" battalions were formed: the 9th, 10th, 11th and 12th. 11 RTR formed part of 79th Armoured Division (a specialist group operating vehicles known as "Hobart's Funnies"), initially equipped with "Canal Defence Light" tanks, it converted to "Buffalo" (the British service name for the US Landing Vehicle Tracked) not long after D-Day and participated in the amphibious landing on Walcheren island and the assault crossing of the Rhine. Prime Minister Winston Churchill was ferried across the Rhine in a Buffalo from 'C' Squadron, 11RTR.

The Regiment's numerous units took part in countless battles in the Second World War, including the Battle of Dunkirk, El Alamein, Italian Campaign, Burma Campaign and D-Day landings of 6 June 1944. Field Marshal Sir Bernard Law Montgomery would frequently wear the regiment's beret, with his Field Marshal's badge sewn on next to the regimental cap badge, as it was more practical whilst travelling on a tank than either a formal peaked hat or the Australian slouch hat he previously wore.

=== Post-war period ===
After service in the Korean War, the RTR was reduced through various amalgamations, firstly, in 1959–60:

- 3 RTR and 6 RTR amalgamated as 3 RTR
- 4 RTR and 7 RTR amalgamated as 4 RTR
- 5 RTR and 8 RTR amalgamated as 5 RTR

In 1969, 5RTR was disbanded, while, in 1992 under Options for Change, 4RTR amalgamated with 1RTR, and 3RTR amalgamated with 2RTR.

The Royal Tank Regiment continued to see action including missions in Bosnia and Herzegovina and Kosovo. Elements of 1RTR were deployed to Afghanistan in 2002 and both regiments were involved in the invasion of Iraq, with the 2RTR battlegroup involved in taking Basra. Both regiments continued deployments to Iraq and Afghanistan, with the final tour to Afghanistan taking place in 2013.

On 2 August 2014, 1RTR and 2RTR amalgamated at Bulford, and for the first time in its history the Royal Tank Regiment became a "Single Battalion" regiment titled the Royal Tank Regiment.

=== Squadron history ===
==== Ajax ====
Ajax is the youngest squadron within the amalgamated Royal Tank Regiment. The previous squadron to bear the name was disbanded in 1993, but the current Ajax Squadron upholds the long-standing traditions of both 1 RTR and 2 RTR (formerly A Squadron and Ajax).

During the First World War, on April 24, 1918, the first recorded tank-on-tank engagement occurred during the Second Battle of Villers-Bretonneux. A Company, operating a Mk IV tank under the command of Lieutenant Frank Mitchell, engaged three German A7Vs and emerged victorious. The company continued to see intense combat for the remainder of the war, including at the Battle of Amiens, where British forces advanced up to 20 miles through enemy lines.

The squadron’s predecessors played a significant role in the Second World War, fighting in key battles across Tobruk, Burma, Iraq, Syria, and Italy. After 1945, 1 RTR was deployed to Hong Kong as the last regular unit to operate the Comet tank. A Squadron took part in 1 RTR’s deployment to Korea between 1952 and 1953, where the regiment fired 24,000 main armament rounds in support of the Commonwealth Division. Subsequent deployments included Aden in 1965, where A Squadron operated from landing ship, tanks (LST) around the Persian Gulf. During the Troubles, the regiment conducted multiple dismounted operational tours in Northern Ireland, including rotations through the infamous Maze prison.

In 1977, Ajax (2 RTR) transitioned into a medium reconnaissance squadron, equipped with CVR(T) Scorpion and Scimitar vehicles. The squadron later reequipped with Challenger 1 tanks in 1984 while stationed in Fallingbostel, Germany. Following the amalgamation of 2 RTR and 3 RTR in 1992, AJAX was disbanded, and 1 RTR restructured its squadrons as A, D, G, and H in tribute to the original Heavy Branch of the Machine Gun Corps.

By 1997, A Squadron was assigned the role of the training and demonstration armored squadron within the Land Warfare Centre Battlegroup at Harman Lines. Personnel rotated through tank and CBRN (Chemical, Biological, Radiological, and Nuclear) roles while also supporting other squadrons in operations such as Op TELIC and Op HERRICK.

During the 2014 amalgamation of 1 RTR and 2 RTR, A Squadron continued the legacy of 1 RTR under the reestablished name Ajax.

==== Badger ====
Badger is named after the Mark IV tank commanded by the Officer in Charge of B Battalion, Tank Corps (later 2nd Battalion Tank Corps), in 1917. This tradition led to the 2nd Royal Tank Regiment’s practice of naming its Squadrons after the OC’s vehicle. The battalion took part in 11 major engagements, earning 116 gallantry awards, including 33 Military Crosses and 50 Military Medals.

By the time the Second World War began, the battalion had transitioned from the 2nd Battalion Tank Corps to the 2nd Battalion Royal Tank Corps, eventually becoming the 2nd Royal Tank Regiment with the formation of the Royal Armoured Corps in 1939. The regiment saw action in every theater of the war, initially on the Western Front before moving to North Africa, where it engaged in tank battles at Sidi Omar, Beda Fomm, and Sidi Barrani, as well as in a dismounted role during the Siege of Tobruk.

Following the conclusion of the Western Desert campaign, the regiment deployed to India and Burma, where it introduced an unconventional use of armored vehicles in mountainous jungle terrain. Despite the difficult conditions, the regiment effectively engaged Japanese forces in an environment not traditionally suited for tanks, earning recognition from both Winston Churchill and Field Marshal Slim.

After completing operations in India and Burma, the regiment underwent training in Iraq and Syria before participating in the Italian campaign. It fought its way from the beaches of Sicily to the River Po, demonstrating adaptability by transitioning from desert warfare to close-quarters combat. The campaign concluded with the regiment crossing the Alps into Austria at the time of Germany’s surrender.

Post-war, the regiment was stationed in Germany as part of the British Army of the Rhine, with garrisons in Fallingbostel and Hohne, while also conducting peacekeeping operations in Northern Ireland. In 1992, it merged with the 3rd Royal Tank Regiment. Throughout the 1990s, the regiment continued peacekeeping deployments, serving in Cyprus, Northern Ireland, Kosovo, and Bosnia.

In 2003, the 2nd Royal Tank Regiment deployed under the 7th Armoured Brigade, The Desert Rats, leading the assault during Op TELIC 1 in Iraq. It returned to Iraq for further deployments, contributing forces to Op TELIC 2, 9, and 10, operating Challenger 2 and Warrior vehicles. Additionally, the regiment took part in Op HERRICK 6, 10, 11, 13, and 18 in Afghanistan, demonstrating its versatility by operating Viking, Warthog, and Mastiff vehicles in diverse combat environments.

==== Cyclops ====
During the First World War, sailors from HMS Cyclops were among the first crews to operate the newly developed landships, which later became known as tanks. To honour their contribution, C Squadron of B Battalion, Tank Corps, was designated Cyclops in 1917. The squadron played an active role in both world wars.

During the Second World War, Cyclops participated in campaigns across multiple regions, including France, Egypt, Singapore, Iraq, Syria, Italy, Austria, and Germany. In the post-war years, the squadron was primarily stationed in Germany and the United Kingdom. However, in 1959, it was deployed to Libya as an armoured car squadron. In 1962, Cyclops transitioned into a parachute armoured squadron, utilizing the Hornet vehicle and Malkara anti-tank missiles to provide an anti-tank capability for 16 Parachute Brigade.

Returning to tanks in 1965, the squadron became an essential component of the 2nd Royal Tank Regiment Battlegroup. Throughout the Cold War, it was frequently deployed on operations, including missions in Radfan, north of Aden in 1966, Cyprus in 1974, and multiple tours in Northern Ireland. Following the merger of the Second and Third Royal Tank Regiments in 1992, Cyclops remained part of the regimental ORBAT, though referred to as C Squadron, and was stationed in Fallingbostel, Germany. It officially reclaimed the name Cyclops in 2001.

The squadron later took part in operations in Bosnia and Kosovo and played a role in the 2003 invasion of Iraq. Further deployments followed, including missions to Afghanistan in 2010 and 2013. In August 2014, after the First and Second Royal Tank Regiments merged, it was confirmed that Cyclops would continue as one of the regiment’s sabre squadrons, operating the Challenger 2 Main Battle Tank.

==== Dreadnaught ====
The history of Dreadnaught traces back to D Company of the Heavy Branch of the Machine Gun Corps, which participated in the first-ever tank action on 15th September 1916. This company eventually developed into D Battalion, then the 4th Royal Tank Corps (RTC), and later the Royal Tank Regiment (RTR). The regiment also honours the legacy of the 7th RTR, which merged with the 4th in 1959 after fighting alongside it throughout much of the war.

In 1940, both the 4th and 7th regiments played a pivotal role in the courageous Arras Counter-Attack against overwhelming opposition. They were also instrumental in the defense of Calais, aiding the evacuation at Dunkirk. The regiments went on to serve in the Western Desert, where they were awarded two Victoria Crosses (to Lt Col Foot and Capt Gardner MC). Their antecedents also served in Korea, Malaya, Northern Ireland, and BAOR, among other locations. The most recent tour associated with the regiment was the deployment of D Squadron on Operation HERRICK 11, where Viking armoured vehicles were used.

The antecedents of Dreadnaught are among the most distinguished in the history of the RTR, contributing the Chinese Eye (now featured on all armoured fighting vehicles), the Pipes and Drums, and the Rose of Kilravock tartan to the regiment's heritage. The badge of Dreadnaught Squadron is oxford blue and white in honour of the 4th Royal Tank Regiment.

==== Egypt ====
The present-day Egypt Squadron was formed from HQ Squadron of 1 RTR and Nero Squadron of 2 RTR following the amalgamation on August 2, 2014. HQ Squadron of 1 RTR had its origins in the 1993 merger of 1 RTR and 4 RTR. The squadron was named in honor of the original company from the Heavy Machine Gun Corps. From 1993 to 1996, it was based in Tidworth, where it played a key role in the regiment’s relocation to Barker Barracks, Paderborn. It then supported the regiment through a demanding training year that included deployments to Grafenwoehr, Poland, BATUS, and Op TOSCA.

F Squadron of 2 RTR was redesignated as E Squadron in 1996, and in 2000, Egypt Squadron was established from E Squadron. The following year, the squadron deployed to Kosovo on Operation Agricola. In 2003, it participated in Operation Telic as part of the Black Watch Battlegroup before deploying to BATUS, where it spent a season as OPFOR. In 2006/07, the squadron returned to Iraq on Op TELIC 9/10, serving within the Kings Battlegroup. In Afghanistan, Operation Herrick 10/11, resulted in significant losses, with three fatalities and 20% of its personnel sustaining life-altering injuries. The second deployment took place during Operation Herrick 18.

Following this, HQ Squadron facilitated the regiment’s move to RAF Honington, where it transitioned into the Joint NBC Regiment. During Op TELIC, it provided vital logistical support to the regiment. From 2003 until the 2014 amalgamation, HQ Squadron continued to play a crucial role in sustaining the regiment both in camp and on operations.

==== Falcon ====
Falcon traces its origins back to F Company of the Heavy Branch of the Machine Gun Corps. In November 1916, F Company was expanded into F Battalion, which later became F Battalion of the Tank Corps. In January 1918, it was re-designated as the 6th Battalion of the Tank Corps.

In 2001, Falcon Squadron was re-formed as the fourth Challenger 2 squadron within the 2nd Royal Tank Regiment. In 2003, the regiment deployed under the 7th Armoured Brigade, The Desert Rats, leading the assault during Operation Telic 1 in Iraq. By late 2005, Falcon Squadron became the first interim medium armour squadron, operating Scimitar CVR(T) vehicles before deploying to BATUS in 2006 for Ex PRAIRIE STORM, where it supported the Royal Green Jackets light role Battlegroup. That same year, a troop from the squadron was sent to Belize in support of the Irish Guards, marking the first deployment of armour to a jungle environment since the late 1970s.

In 2007, FALCON Squadron deployed as an independent sub-unit on Op HERRICK 6 in Afghanistan, becoming the first unit to operate MASTIFF vehicles. The squadron saw significant action as dismounted troops in Lashkargah, Sangin, and FOB Fox, taking part in all major UK operations in the Sangin Valley area, which included several encounters with improvised explosive devices (IEDs). Between late 2007 and 2010, the squadron participated in training exercises, range work, and deployments to BATUS. In 2010 and 2011, it returned to Afghanistan on Op HERRICK 13, with elements operating across Helmand and Kandahar provinces. FALCON Squadron was disbanded in 2012.

In 2014, it was re-established as Falcon (Area Survey and Reconnaissance) Squadron, providing the UK’s only CRN AS&R (Chemical, Radiological, Nuclear Area Survey and Reconnaissance) capability. In 2019, it came under the operational command of 28 Engineer Regiment (C-CBRN) as FALCON Squadron (C-CBRN). Today, the squadron functions as a specialist, live agent-trained, lightly armoured, all-wheeled reconnaissance unit.

In 2018, FALCON Squadron deployed on Op MORLOP in Salisbury in response to the Novichok nerve agent attack, while also sending a section to Estonia on Op CABRIT 3. The following year, 13 and 14 Troops were deployed to BATUS to test AS&R capabilities alongside a combined arms Battlegroup, while another troop conducted Ex TOXIC PATH in France.

== Organisation ==
The regiment comes under the direct command of 12th Armoured Brigade Combat Team, itself part of the 3rd (UK) Division, the British Army's only armoured division. The 12th Armoured BCT contains three of the Army's four armoured regiments; the RTR, the King's Royal Hussars (KRH), and Royal Wessex Yeomanry (RWxY).

Unlike the other armoured regiments, the Royal Tank Regiment also has a Chemical, Biological, Radiological, Nuclear (CBRN) reconnaissance squadron, Falcon Squadron, operating the Fuchs reconnaissance vehicle, which is composed of RTR soldiers but comes under the operational command of 28 Engineer Regiment (C-CBRN).

The regiment currently comprises six squadrons:

Royal Tank Regiment, Headquarters at Bulford Camp

- Ajax – Challenger 2
- Badger – Challenger 2
- Cyclops – Challenger 2
- Dreadnaught – Challenger 2
- Egypt – Headquarters, Command, and Reconnaissance
- Falcon – CBRN area surveillance & reconnaissance (under the command of 28 Engineer Regiment (C-CBRN)), based at Harman Lines, Warminster Garrison

As part of the Future Soldier reforms, the regiment's reconnaissance troop will be equipped with Ajax armoured fighting vehicles.

== Equipment ==
The Royal Tank Regiment is equipped with 56 Challenger 2s, a third-generation main battle tank that has been in service since 1998.

From 2027, the Challenger 2 will be replaced by the new fourth-generation Challenger 3, which replaces the Challenger 2 L30A1 rifled 120mm with the 120mm L55A1 smoothbore gun, providing commonality with tanks of other NATO members such as the Leopard 2, and M1 Abrams The L55A1 has a longer barrel and the ability to handle higher chamber pressures. The L55A1 allows Challenger 3 use of programmable high-explosive ammunition such as the DM11, enabling airburst capability. Under the Heavy Armour Automotive Improvement Programme, Challenger 3 will receive an improved version of Challenger 2's CV12-6A engine – CV12-8A – along with third-generation hydrogas suspension. The tank's survivability will also be increased, with the addition of the Elbit Laser Warning System (ELAWS); capable of "detecting, categorising and accurately pinpointing laser sources such as range finders, Anti-Tank Guided Missiles, target designators and infrared illuminators." The Challenger 3 will further be equipped with the Trophy active protection system from Rafael Advanced Defense Systems, which provides 360° azimuth protection from threats including "rockets to ATGMs and High-Explosive Anti-Tank (HEAT) rounds".

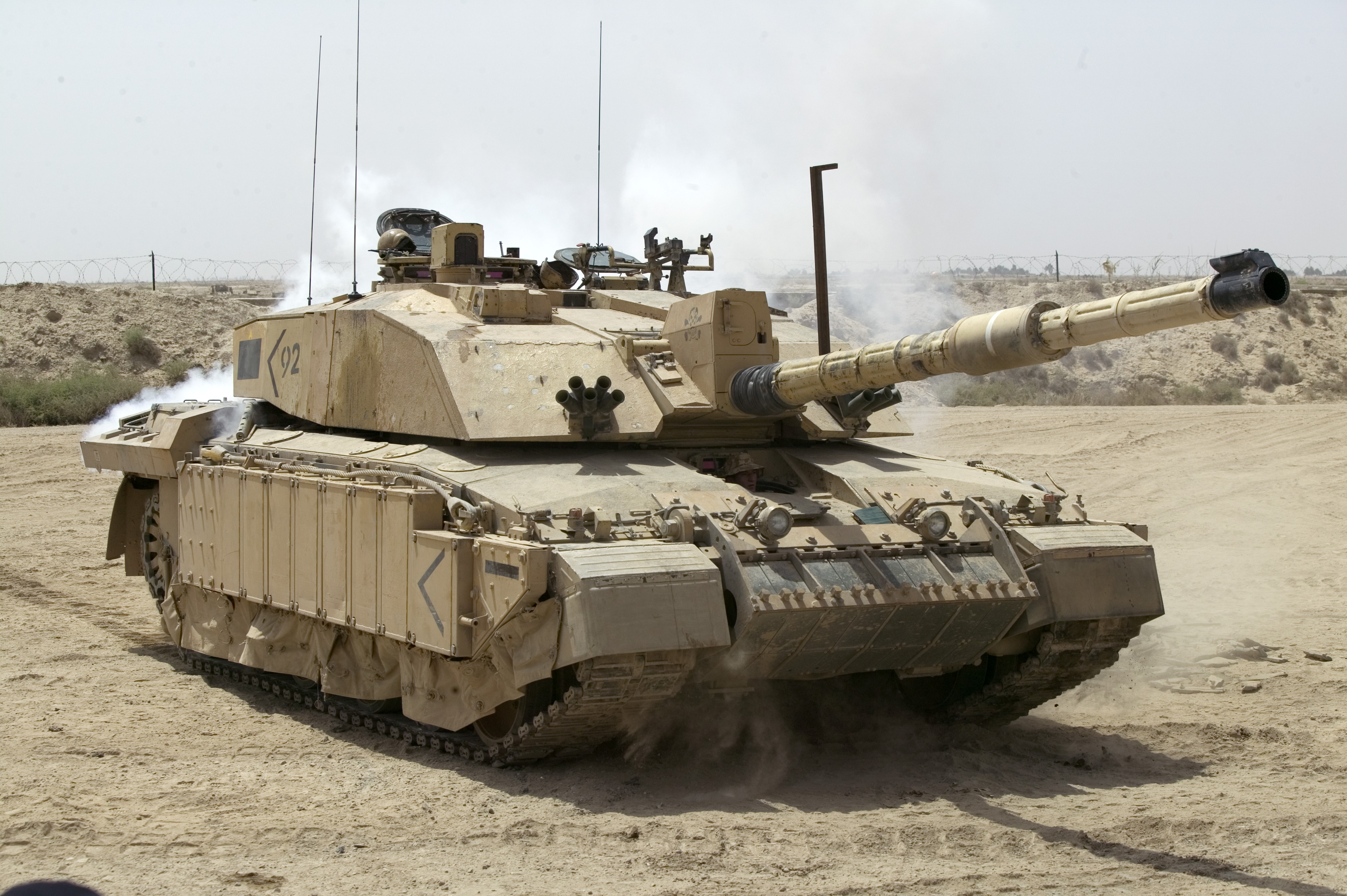
Challenger 2

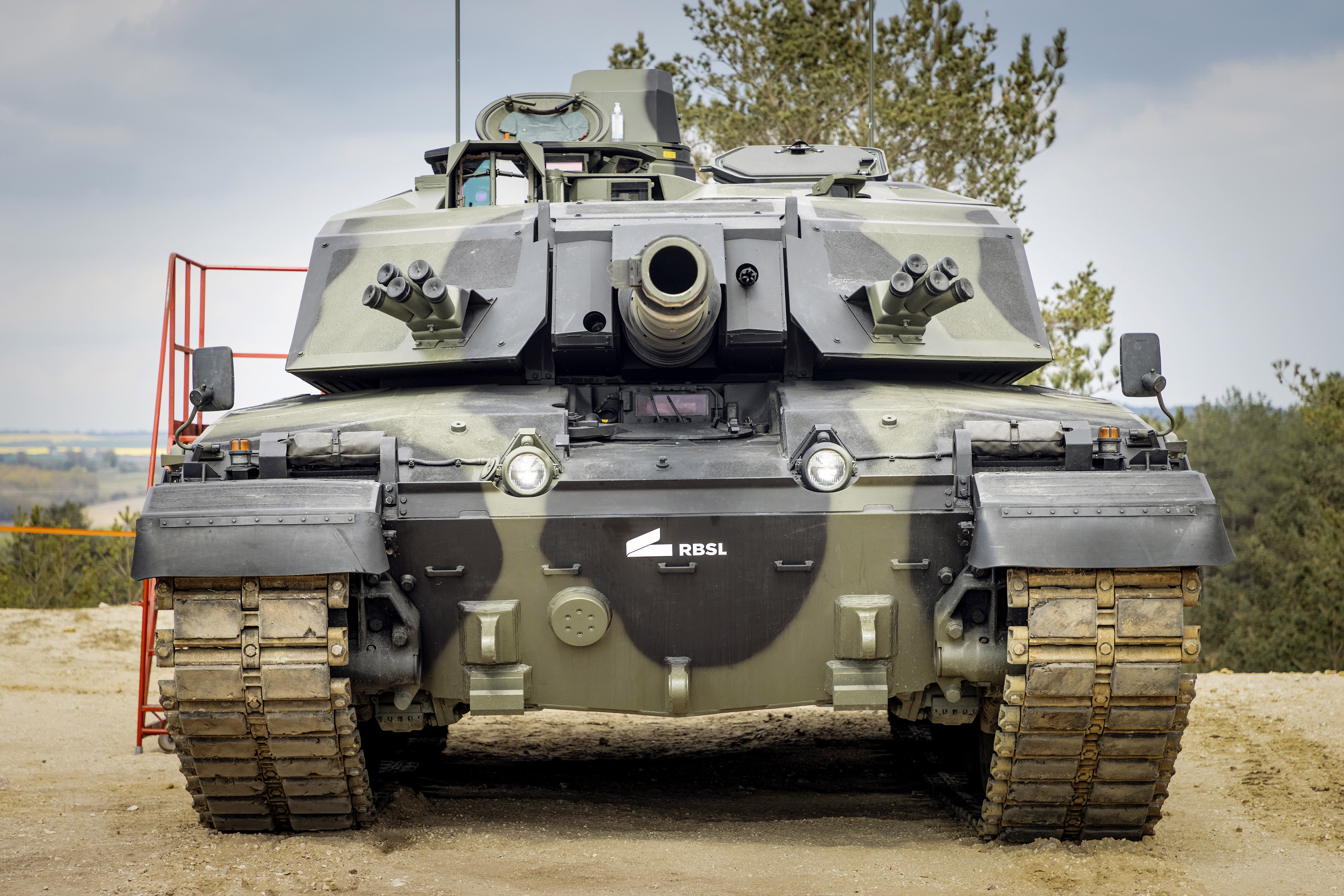
Challenger 3

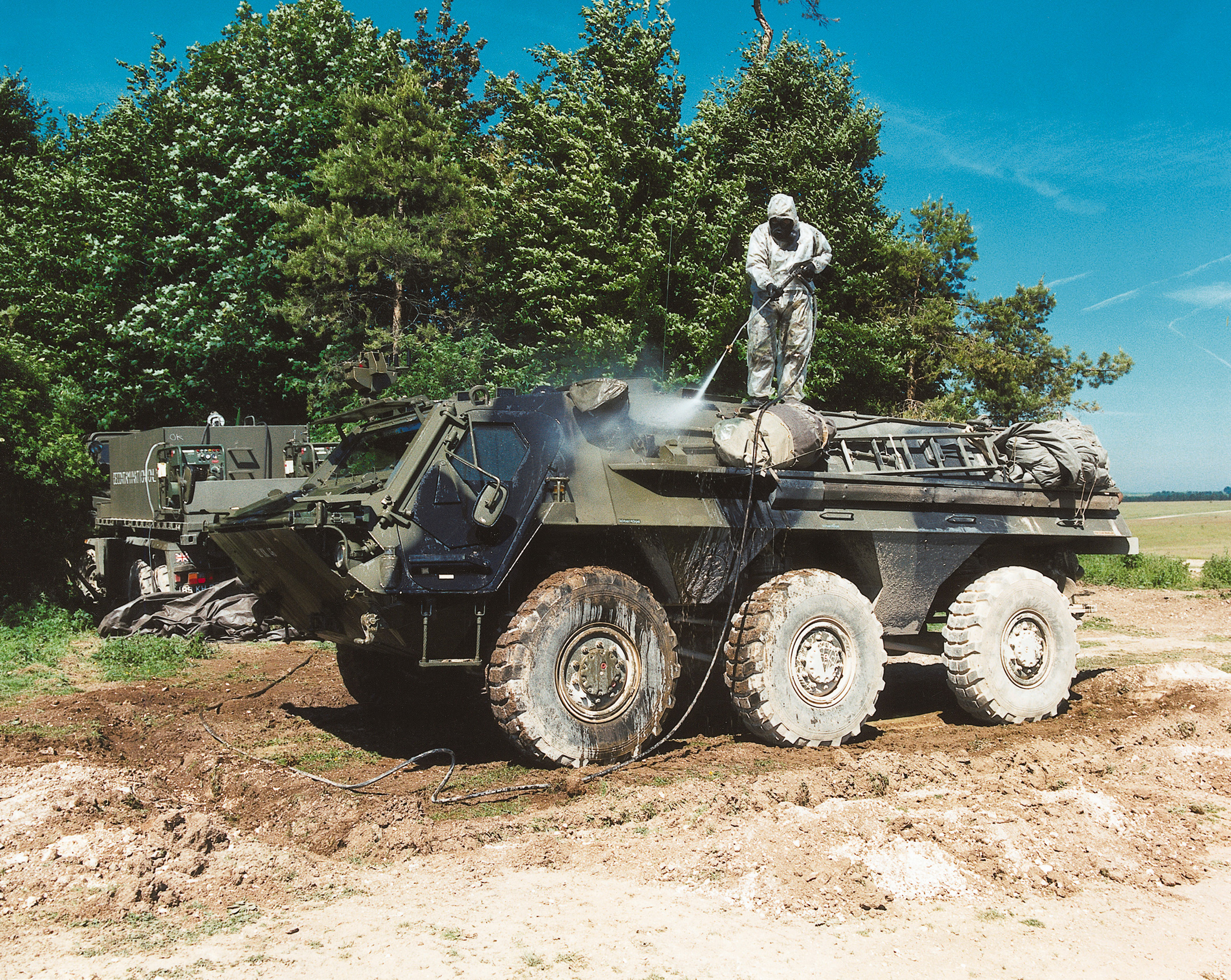
Fuchs

== Squadron organisation ==
=== Ajax Squadron ===
Squadron Headquarters
Tank	Number	Name
Challenger 2	10D	Ajax
Challenger 2	10E	Argyle

1 Troop
Tank	Number	Name
Challenger 2	11A	Abdullah
Challenger 2	11B	Ace
Challenger 2	11C	Aggressive
Challenger 2	11D	Achilles

2 Troop
Tank	Number	Name
Challenger 2	12A	Adsum
Challenger 2	12B	Arethusa
Challenger 2	12C	Albatross
Challenger 2	12D	Apollo

3 Troop
Tank	Number	Name
Challenger 2	13A	Appolyon
Challenger 2	13B	Amazon
Challenger 2	13C	Artemus
Challenger 2	13D	Autogophasta

=== Badger Squadron ===
The structure is as follows:
Squadron Headquarters

Tank	Number	Name
Challenger 2	20D	Badger
Challenger 2	20E	Battle Axe

4 Troop

Tank	Number	Name
Challenger 2	21A	Bandit
Challenger 2	21B	Bedouin
Challenger 2	21C	Bogey
Challenger 2	21D	Bansgee

5 Troop

Tank	Number	Name
Challenger 2	22A	Black Arrow
Challenger 2	22B	Bally Hackle
Challenger 2	22C	Bayardo
Challenger 2	22D	Brigand

6 Troop

Tank	Number	Name
Challenger 2	23A	Buccaneer
Challenger 2	23B	Buffoon
Challenger 2	23C	Bison
Challenger 2	23D	Blackleg

=== Cyclops Squadron ===
The structure is as follows:
Squadron Headquarters

Tank	Number	Name
Challenger 2	30D	Cyclops
Challenger 2	30E	Cynic

7 Troop

Tank	Number	Name
Challenger 2	31A	Conqueror
Challenger 2	31B	Challenger
Challenger 2	31C	Comet
Challenger 2	31D	Chieftain

8 Troop

Tank	Number	Name
Challenger 2	32A	Caesar
Challenger 2	32B	Claudius
Challenger 2	32C	Caligula
Challenger 2	32D	Cleopatra

9 Troop

Tank	Number	Name
Challenger 2	33A	Cobra
Challenger 2	33B	Chin
Challenger 2	33C	Cornwall
Challenger 2	33D	Compo

=== Dreadnaught Squadron ===
The structure is as follows:
Squadron Headquarters

Tank	Number	Name
Challenger 2	40D	Dreadnaught
Challenger 2	40E	Despot

10 Troop

Tank	Number	Name
Challenger 2	41A	Delilah
Challenger 2	41B	Desmond
Challenger 2	41C	Delia
Challenger 2	41D	Delicia

11 Troop

Tank	Number	Name
Challenger 2	42A	Darius
Challenger 2	42B	Demon II
Challenger 2	42C	Dracula
Challenger 2	42D	Die Hard

12 Troop

Tank	Number	Name
Challenger 2	61A	Daredevil
Challenger 2	61B	Death's Head
Challenger 2	62A	Deliverance
Challenger 2	62B	Devil

=== Falcon Squadron ===
The structure is as follows:

13 Troop (Vanguard)
Vehicle	Number	Name
Fuchs	11B	Fums Up
Fuchs	11C	Formidable
Fuchs	11D	Flirt
Fuchs	11E	Fervent

14 Troop (Main Body)
Vehicle	Number	Name
Fuchs	12B	Ferocious
Fuchs	12C	Frisky
Fuchs	12D	Flying Fox
Fuchs	12E	Firefly

== The Tank Museum ==
The Tank Museum, the museum of the Royal Tank Regiment and Royal Armoured Corps, is at Bovington Camp in Dorset. The collection traces the history of the tank with almost 300 vehicles on display. It includes Tiger 131, the only working example of a German Tiger I tank, and a British First World War Mark I, the world's oldest surviving combat tank.

== Battle honours ==
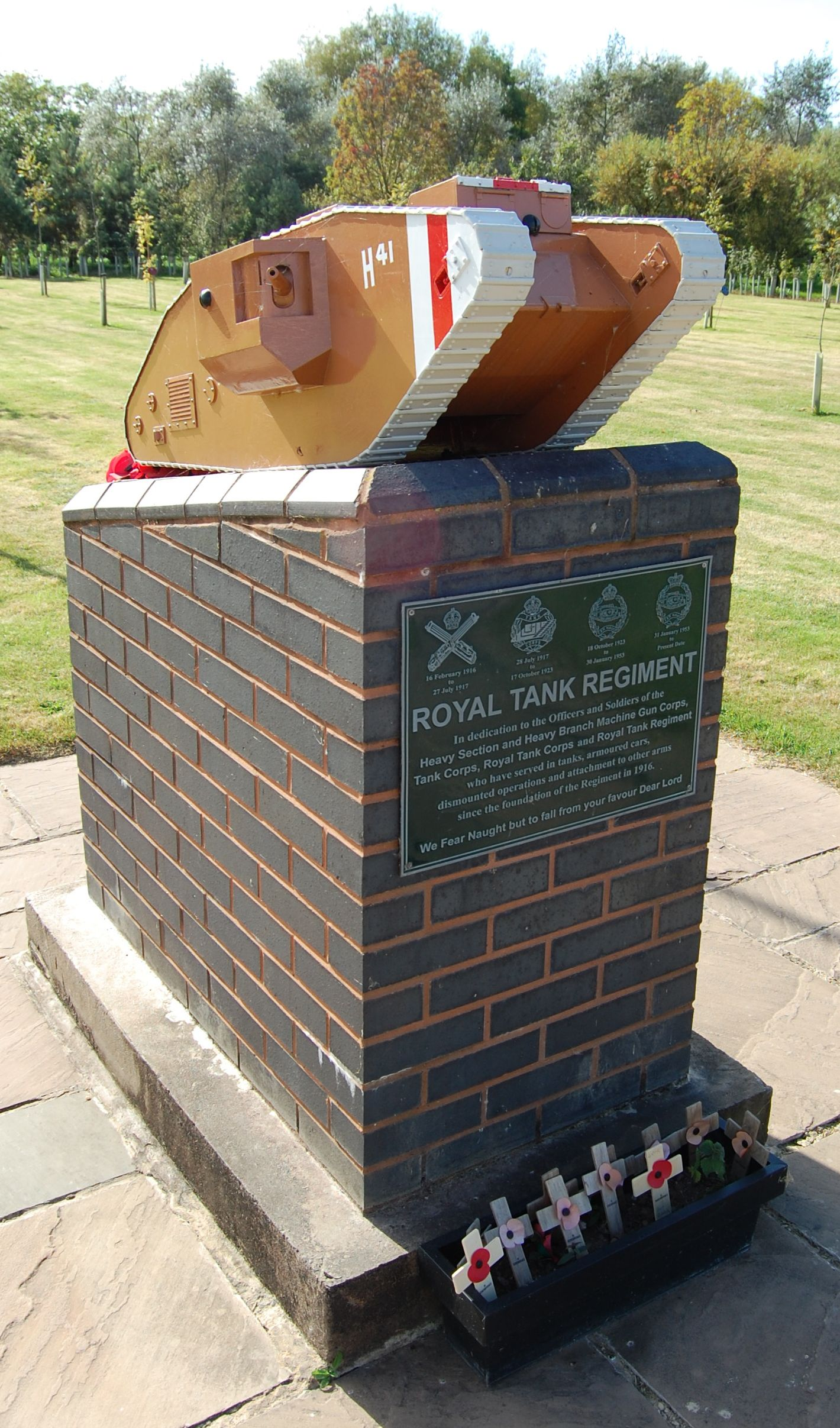
Royal Tank Regiment memorial at the National Memorial Arboretum.

The battle honours of the regiment are:

=== The Great War ===
- Somme 1916 '18, Arras 1917 '18, Messines 1917, Ypres 1917, Cambrai 1917, St. Quentin 1918, Villers-Bretonneux, Amiens, Bapaume 1918, Hindenburg Line, Épehy, Selle, France and Flanders 1916–18, Gaza

=== The Second World War ===
- North-West Europe 1940

Arras Counter Attack, Calais 1940, St. Omer-La Bassée, Somme

- North Africa 1940–43

Sidi Barrani, Beda Fomm, Sidi Suleiman, Tobruk 1941, Sidi Rezegh 1941, Belhamed, Gazala, Cauldron, Knightsbridge, Defence of Alamein Line, Alam el Halfa, El Alamein, Mareth, Akarit, Fondouk, El Kourzia, Medjez Plain, Tunis

- Sicily 1943

Primosole Bridge, Gerbini, Adrano

- Italy 1943–45

Sangro, Salerno, Volturno Crossing, Garigliano Crossing, Anzio, Advance to Florence, Gothic Line, Coriano, Lamone Crossing, Rimini Line, Argenta Gap

- North-West Europe 1944-45

Odon, Caen, Bourguébus Ridge, Mont Pincon, Falaise, Nederrijn, Scheldt, Venlo Pocket, Rhineland, Rhine, Bremen

Abyssinia 1940, Greece 1941, Burma 1942

=== Post-war years ===
Korea 1951–53

Al Basrah, Iraq 2003

== Colonels-Commandant ==
Colonels-Commandant have been:

Name	Colonel Commandant	Representative
Major General Sir John Capper KCB KCVO	1917–1923 (Director General)	
Major General Sir John Capper KCB KCVO	1923–1934	
Major General Sir Ernest Swinton KBE CB DSO	1934–1938	1934–1938
Field Marshal Sir Archibald Montgomery-Massingberd GCB KCMG LLD ADC	1934–1939	
General Sir Hugh Elles KCB KCMG KCVO DSO	1934–1945	1939
Major General G M Lindsay CB CMG DSO	1938–1947	1940–1943
Lieutenant General Sir Charles BroadKCB DSO	1939–1948	1944–1947
Field Marshal The Viscount Montgomery of Alamein KG GCB DSO DL	1939–1948	1944–1947
Major General Sir Percy Hobart KBE CB DSO MC	1947–1951	1948–1951
General Sir John Crocker GCB KBE DSO MC	1949–1961	
Major General N W Duncan CB CBE DSO	1952–1959	1952–1957
Major General H R B Foote VC CB DSO	1957–1964	1958–1961
Lieutenant General Sir Harold Pyman KCB CBE DSO	1959–1965	
Major General H M Liardet CB CBE DSO DL	1961–1967	1962–1967
Major General Sir Alan Jolly CB CBE DSO	1965–1968	
Field Marshal Sir Michael Carver GCB CBE DSO MC ADC	1968–1973	1970–1971
Major General P R C Hobart CB DSO OBE MC	1968–1978	1971–1974
General Sir Richard Ward CB DSO MC	1970–1976	1974–1976
Lieutenant General Sir Allan TaylorKBE MC	1973–1980	
Major General J G R Allen CB	1976–1981	1977–1980
Major General R L C Dixon CB MC	1978–1983	1982–1983
Lieutenant General Sir Richard Lawson KCB DSO MC	1980–1982	1980–1982
Major General I H Baker CBE	1981–1986	
Major General R M Jerram MBE	1982–1988	1983–1985
General Sir Antony Walker KCB	1983–1987	1985–1991
Major General Sir Laurence New CB CBE	1986–1992	
Lieutenant General Sir Jeremy Blacker KCB	1988–1994	
Name	Colonel Commandant	Deputy Colonel Commandant
Major General R W M McAfee CB	1995–1999	1993–1994
Brigadier A C I Gadsby		1994–2000
Lieutenant General A P Ridgway CB CBE	1999–2006	1995–1999
Lieutenant General A D Leakey CMG CBE	2006–2010	1999–2006
Major General P Gilchrist CB		2000–2008
Lieutenant General Sir Christopher Deverell KCB MBE	2010–2015	2006–2010
Brigadier S Caraffi MBE ADC		2008–2010
Brigadier P J Allison		2010–2015
Brigadier P D P Hankinson MBE		2012–2015
Brigadier I J Gibb CBE		2015–2018
Major General J R Patterson	2015–2018	
Brigadier G J Thompson	2018–2025	2015–2018
Colonel J M Williams		2018–Unknown
Brigadier N J Cowey MBE		2019–Present
Brigadier Simon Andrew Ridgway OBE	2025–Present	

== Uniform ==
The Uniform of the Royal Tank Regiment is unique in many ways to the rest of the Royal Armoured Corps and British Army:

=== Black beret ===
Much of the uniform and equipment of soldiers during the First World War was quite impractical for use inside a tank. In particular, the vision apertures in a tank were so small that it was necessary to keep the eyes very close to them in order to get even a limited vision. Thus, any headdress with a peak was entirely unsuitable. In May 1918, General Elles and Colonel Fuller were discussing the future of the Tank Corps and its uniform and General Elles tried on a beret of the 70th Chasseurs Alpins, which was billeted nearby. A black beret was selected as it would not show oil stains. No change in uniform was possible during the war, but after a prolonged argument with the War Office, the black beret was approved by King George V on 5 March 1924. The black beret remained the exclusive headdress of the Royal Tank Corps until its practical value was recognised by others and its use extended to the majority of the Royal Armoured Corps in 1940. On the introduction of the blue beret in 1949, the Royal Tank Regiment reclaimed its right to the exclusive use of the black beret, which may not be worn by any other Regiment or Corps with the exception of the Berkshire and Westminster Dragoons Squadron of The Royal Yeomanry.

=== Black overalls ===
The wearing of black overalls is a custom reserved to the Regiment by Material Regulations for the Army, volume 3, Pamphlet No 4 (Code 13251). It stems from the Royal Review held at Aldershot in the presence of King George V on 13 July 1935 on which occasion black overalls were worn on parade by all ranks of the Royal Tanks Corps. The practice lapsed during the Second World War, but was re-introduced in the 1950s.

=== Black accoutrements ===
Royal Tank Regiment officers and senior warrant officers also wear both a black Sam Browne and a black sword scabbard, while other ranks wear a black parade belt.

=== Sleeve badge ===
The sleeve badge of a First World War Mk 1 tank preceded the formation of the Royal Tank Corps when it was worn by the Heavy Branch of the Machine Gun Corps. Authorised on 7 May 1917, it is still worn today by all ranks on No.1 and No.2 dress and on their sleeve brassard on black overalls.

=== The ash plant ===
During the First World War, walking sticks were often carried by officers. Such sticks came to have a new and more important use with the introduction of tanks, which often became 'bogged' on battlefields, particularly in Flanders. Officers of the Tank Corps used these sticks to probe the ground in front of their tanks testing for firmness as they went forward. Often, the commanders led their tanks into action on foot. To commemorate this, officers of the Regiment carry ash plant sticks instead of the short cane customary to other arms.

== Order of precedence ==
Preceded by Light Dragoons	Royal Armoured Corps Order of Precedence	Succeeded by Last in the Royal Armoured Corps; Order of Precedence

== Alliances ==
- Canada: 12^{e} Régiment blindé du Canada
- Australia: 1st Armoured Regiment
- New Zealand: Royal New Zealand Armoured Corps
- New Zealand: Queen Alexandra's Mounted Rifles
- India: 2nd Lancers (Gardner's Horse)
- Pakistan: 13th Lancers
- Royal Navy: HMS Kent
- France: 501^{e} Régiment de chars de combat (Bond of Friendship)

=== Affiliated Yeomanry ===
- Dorset Yeomanry
- Westminster Dragoons (2RTR)
- Royal Devon Yeomanry (2RTR)
- Royal Wessex Yeomanry

== See also ==
- History of the tank

== Bibliography ==
- Durie, William (2012). The British Garrison Berlin 1945 - 1994: nowhere to go ... a pictorial historiography of the British Military occupation / presence in Berlin. Berlin: Vergangenheitsverlag (de). ISBN 978-3-86408-068-5. OCLC 978161722.
- Forty, George; Livesey, Jack (2012). The Complete Guide to Tanks and Armoured Fighting Vehicles. Southwater. ISBN 978-1780191645.
- Joslen, Lt-Col H.F. (1990) [1st. Pub. HMSO:1960]. Orders of Battle, Second World War, 1939–1945. London: London Stamp Exchange. ISBN 0-948130-03-2.
