= 50th Indian Tank Brigade =

- Active: 1941–1945
- Country: (British Raj) British India
- Allegiance: British Empire
- Branch: British Indian Army
- Type: Tank
- Size: Brigade
- Engagements: Burma Campaign

The 50th Indian Tank Brigade was an armoured brigade formation of the Indian Army during World War II. It was formed for service in the Burma Campaign of World War II from units of the British Army and the British Indian Army. The brigade's formation emblem was a white upraised fist and forearm on a black disc.

The 50th Indian Tank brigade was placed under the command of XV Corps in October 1944 as armoured support for the Arakan campaign and located north of Maungdaw at Waybin in early December. Units of the brigade took part in actions at Buthidaung, The Mayu Peninsula, the Myebon Peninsula and Kangaw. The brigade was withdrawn from the Arakan in February 1945.

== Composition ==
25th Dragoons with Lee/Grant tanks
146th Regiment of the Royal Armoured Corps, raised from a Battalion of the Duke of Wellington's Regiment, with Lee/Grant tanks
149th Regiment of the Royal Armoured Corps, raised from 7th Kings Own Light Infantry, with Grant tanks and Sherman tanks
19th King George's Own Lancers, with Sherman tanks
45th Cavalry, with Stuart light tanks
2/4th Bombay Grenadiers

== See also ==
- List of Indian Army brigades in World War II
