= Tiger 131 =

Only operational Tiger I tank

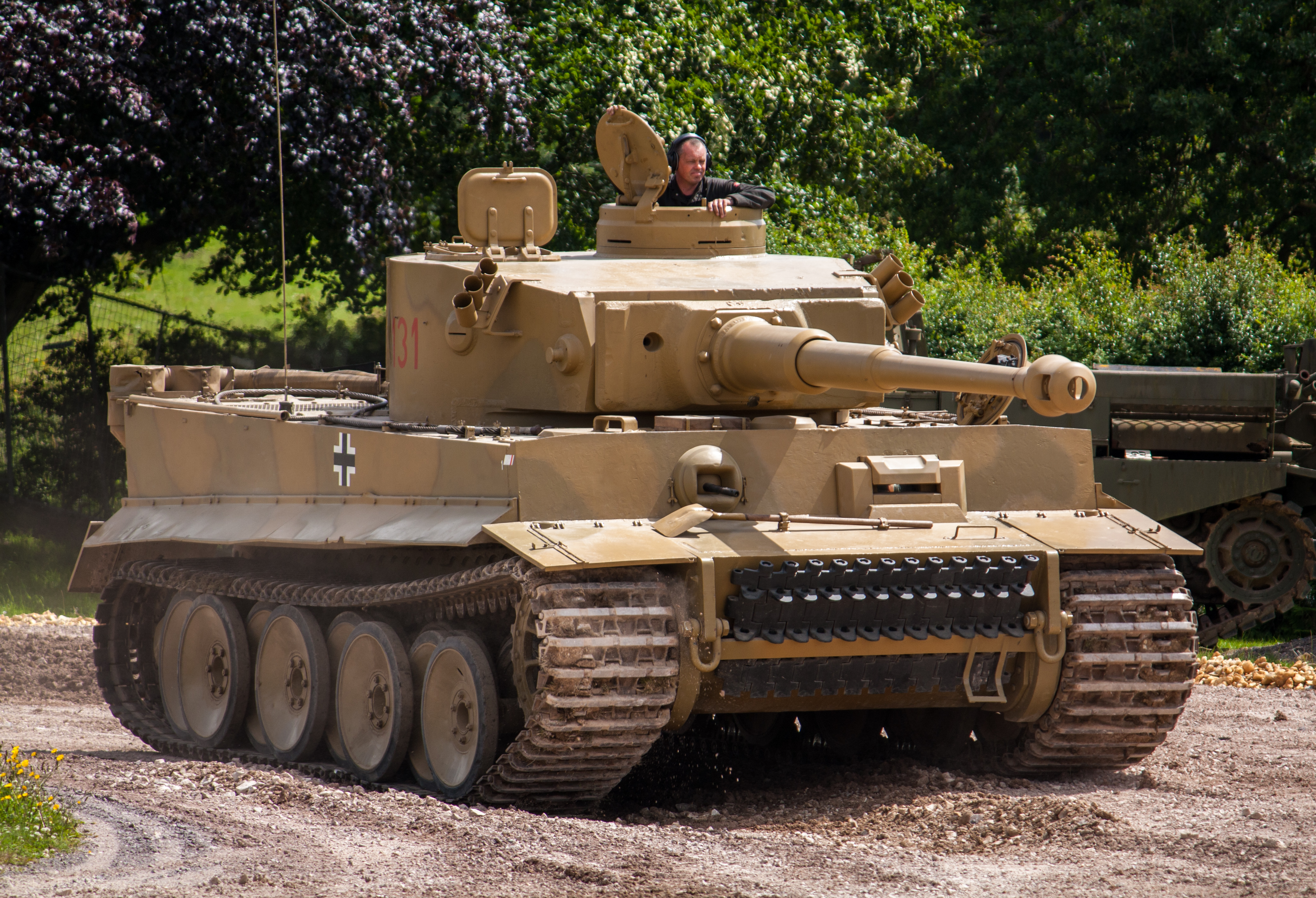
- Tiger 131 on display at Tankfest 2012
- Location: The Tank Museum
- Designer: Henschel & Son
- Type: Tiger tank
- Length: 6.316 m (20 ft 8.7 in) 8.45 m (27 ft 9 in) (gun forward)
- Width: 3.70 m (12 ft 2 in)
- Height: 3.0 m (9 ft 10 in)

Tiger 131 is a German Tiger I heavy tank captured by the British Army on 24 April 1943 during Operation Vulcan in Tunisia during World War II. Preserved at The Tank Museum in Bovington in Dorset, England, it is currently one of two operational Tiger Is in the world.

== German service ==
Known to the Allies as the Tiger I, the German model designation was Panzerkampfwagen VI, Tiger I (H1), Sd.Kfz. 181. It was built in Kassel, central Germany; the hull was constructed by Henschel, while the turret was made by Wegmann AG. The tank was completed in February 1943. It was shipped to Tunisia between 12 March and 16 April 1943. The tank was assigned to the Schwere Panzer-Abteilung 504 (German: Heavy Tank Battalion 504) during the Tunisian campaign of the wider war in North Africa. It was placed in No. 1 Company, No. 3 Platoon, as the 1st (platoon commander) tank, giving it tactical number 131 painted on the turret, by which it has come to be known.

== Capture ==
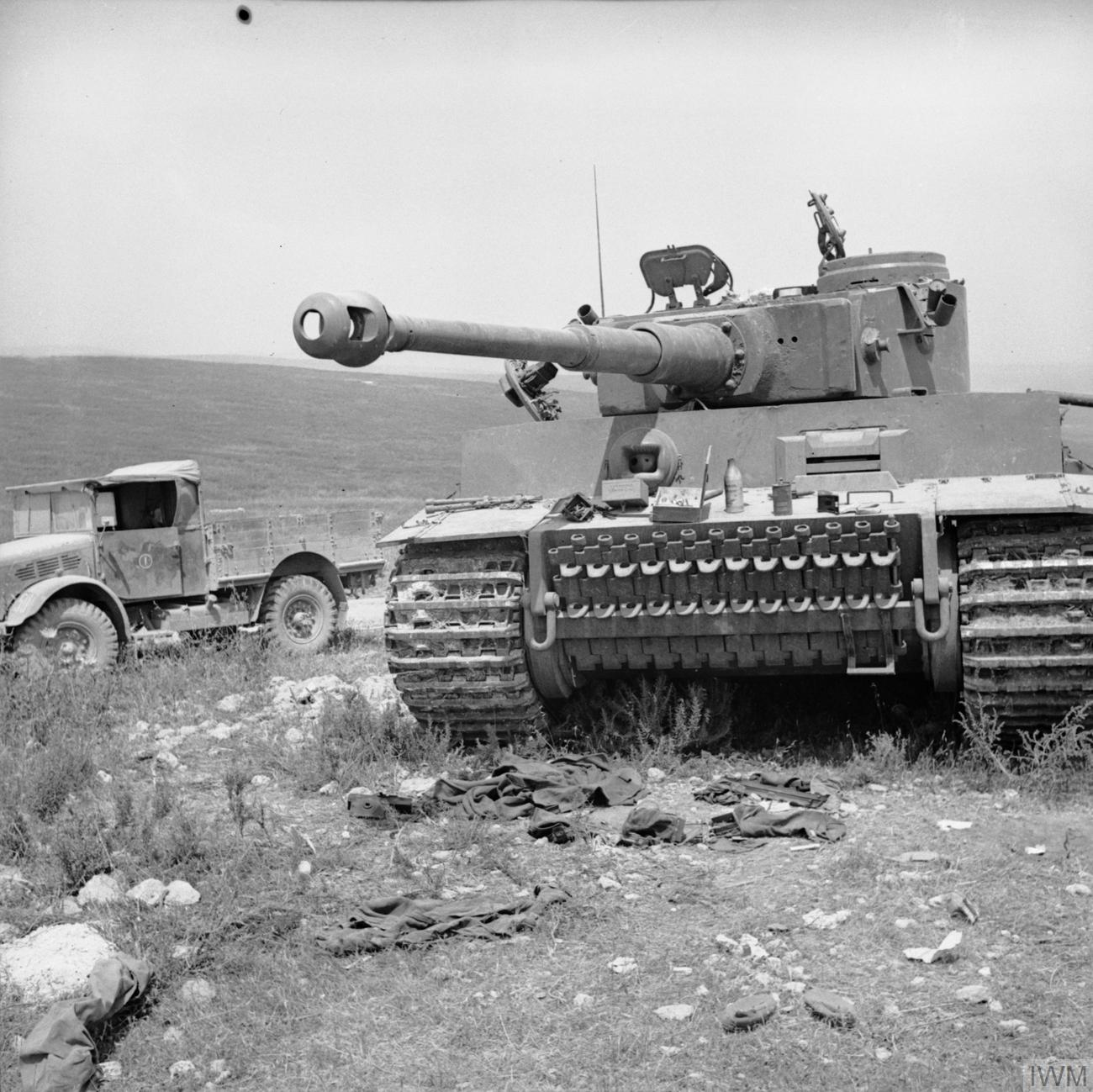
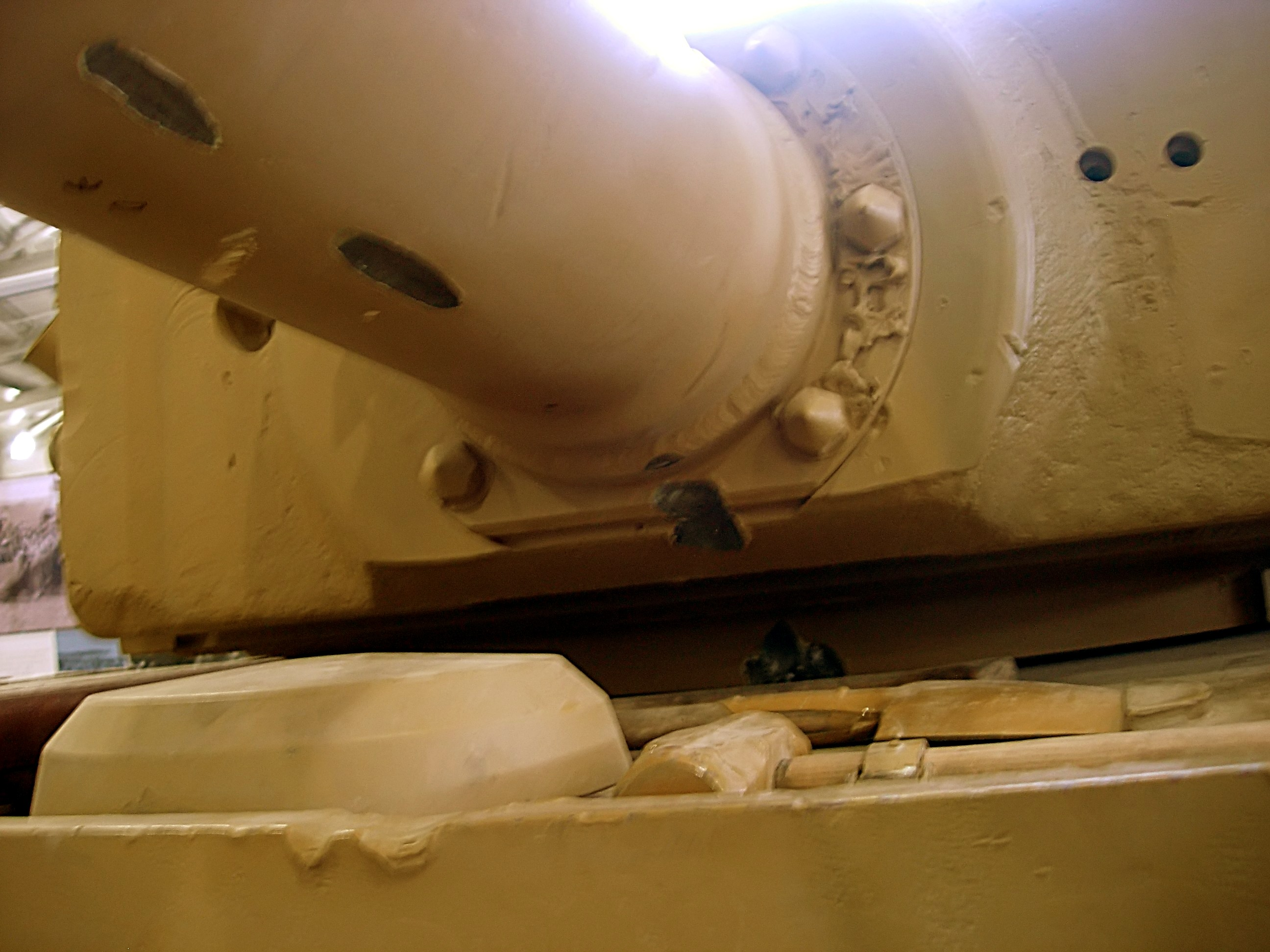
Tiger 131 photographed in Tunisia on 6 May 1943 (top). Restored tank 131 at The Tank Museum showing the damage that immobilized the turret (bottom).

Until 2019, the Tank Museum believed that Tiger Tank 131 was captured at Djebel Djaffa in Tunisia on 21 April 1943. The largely-intact vehicle had been immobilised after the Afrika Korps launched a spoiling attack - code named Operation 'Fliederblüte' (Lilac Blossom). This was a large spoiling attack against the British V Corps on Djebel Djaffa, also known as 'Banana Ridge'. On the night of 20/21 April 1943, while the Allies were preparing a push toward Tunis, the Germans attacked four points simultaneously, including a pass on Djebel Djaffa.

Two Tigers and several other tanks advanced through this pass before dawn, and were gradually driven back during the day. One Tiger was hit by three shots from the 6-pounder guns (57mm) of the Churchill tanks of A Squadron, 4 Troop of the 48th Royal Tank Regiment (48 RTR). A solid shot hit a Tiger's gun barrel and ricocheted into its turret ring, jamming its traverse ability, wounding the driver and front gunner and destroying the radio. A second shot hit the turret lifting lug, disabling the gun's elevation device. A third shot hit the loader's hatch, deflecting fragments into the turret. The German crew bailed out, taking their wounded with them and leaving the knocked-out but still driveable and largely intact tank behind. The tank was secured by the British as they captured Djebel Djaffa hill.

The official story changed in April 2019 when Dale Oscroft visited the Tank Museum. He was struck by the similarity between Tiger 131 and a story his father, John Oscroft, told him when he was part of 2nd Battalion Sherwood Foresters who captured a position called "Point 174" (Gueriat el Atach) without promised tank support during the opening stages of 'Operation Vulcan'. After its capture the Germans immediately counter-attacked with tanks including Tigers. John Oscroft was told to hit one Tiger with his PIAT anti-tank weapon. After crawling forward to get as close as possible, he fired but the projectile bounced off the Tiger so he did not fire again. By this time, supporting Churchill tanks had arrived and a shot by a Churchill from either the 142nd Regiment RAC or 48 RTR jammed the turret, forcing the Tiger crew to abandon their tank. Photographic and documentary evidence corroborated Oscroft's story, proving that Tiger 131 was the tank disabled at Point 174 on 24 April 1943 and not the Tiger taken at Djebel Djaffa on 21 April.

=== Dismissed claim ===
A 2012 article in the Daily Mail newspaper, followed by a book by Noel Botham and Bruce Montague entitled Catch that Tiger, claimed that Major Douglas Lidderdale, the REME engineering officer who oversaw the return of Tiger 131 to England, was responsible for the capture of Tiger 131 as the leader of a secret mission appointed by Winston Churchill to obtain a Tiger for Allied intelligence. This account has been rejected by The Tank Museum as inaccurate because it contradicts Lidderdale's own personal letters and papers which stated he was not personally present when the Tiger was captured.

== Preservation ==
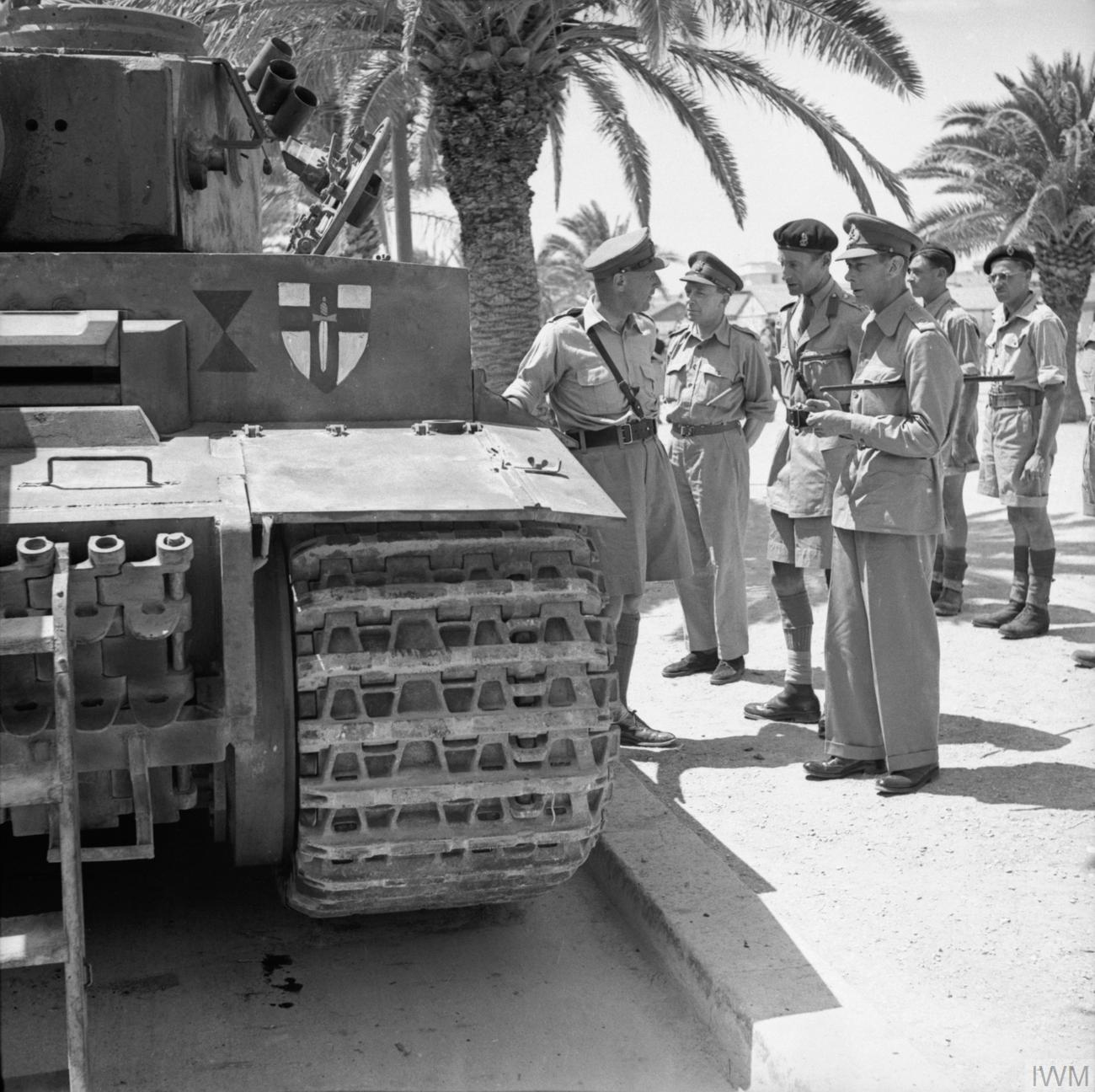
King George VI inspecting Tiger 131 in Tunis, June 1943. The badge of the British First Army had been painted onto the tank.

Tiger 131 was repaired with parts from other destroyed Tigers and evaluated to judge its performance. It was displayed in Tunis and formally inspected there by King George VI and Winston Churchill. The tank was sent to England in October 1943 where it was displayed as a trophy at various locations to raise wartime morale before it was subjected to extensive testing and evaluation by the School of Tank Technology at Chobham, which produced detailed reports on its construction. The tank was transferred to what is today known as The Tank Museum by the British Ministry of Supply on 25 September 1951 where it was given the accession number 2351 (later E1951.23).

In 1990 the tank was removed from display for a joint restoration effort by the staff and the Army Base Repair Organisation, which involved its almost complete disassembly. The Maybach HL230 engine from the museum's Tiger II was installed as the Tiger's original Maybach HL210 had been removed and cut into cross sections for display. A modern fire-suppressant system was added to the engine compartment, the only other significant alteration. The wear and performance of the refitted Tiger engine was studied by metallurgists to explore the alloys and performance of WWII German manufacturing.

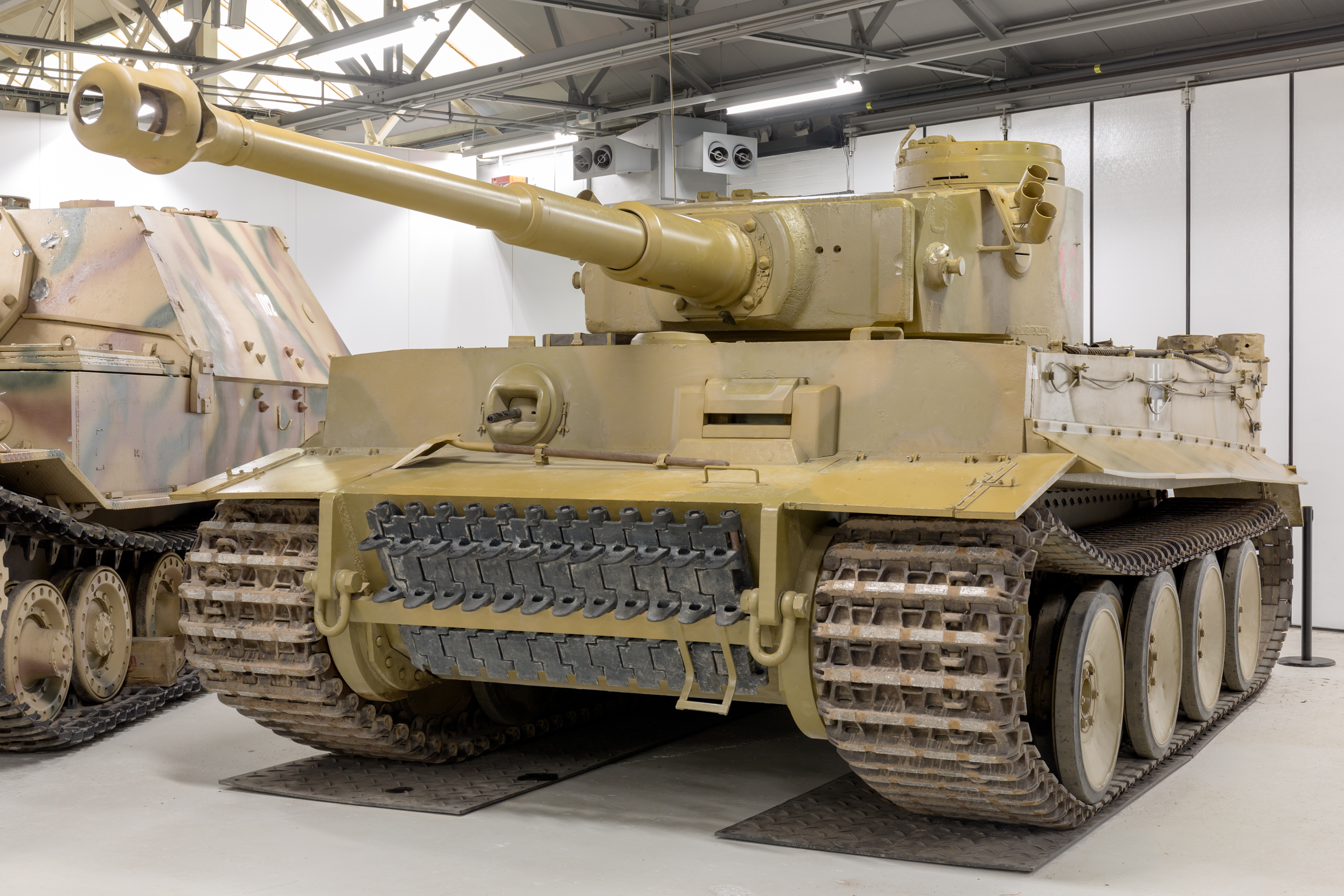
Tiger 131 at The Tank Museum in Bovington, Dorset, England, 2017.

In December 2003, Tiger 131 returned to the museum with a working engine, making it the most popular exhibit at the museum. Further work and repainting in period colours completed the restoration in 2012, for a total cost quoted at £80,000. It remained the only operational Tiger I in the world until September 2026, when the Musée des Blindés completed restoration of its own Tiger I.

Tiger 131 was used in the 2014 film Fury, the first time a real Tiger has appeared in a feature film since They Were Not Divided (1950).

In September 2025, a piece of battle shrapnel was found wedged in one of the wheels of Tiger 131 during routine maintenance. Nick Booth, Head of Curatorial Services at the museum, described finding the shrapnel as "both remarkable and sobering", given the tank has been extensively overhauled and restored.

== See also ==
- Battle of Longstop Hill
