= 25th Dragoons =

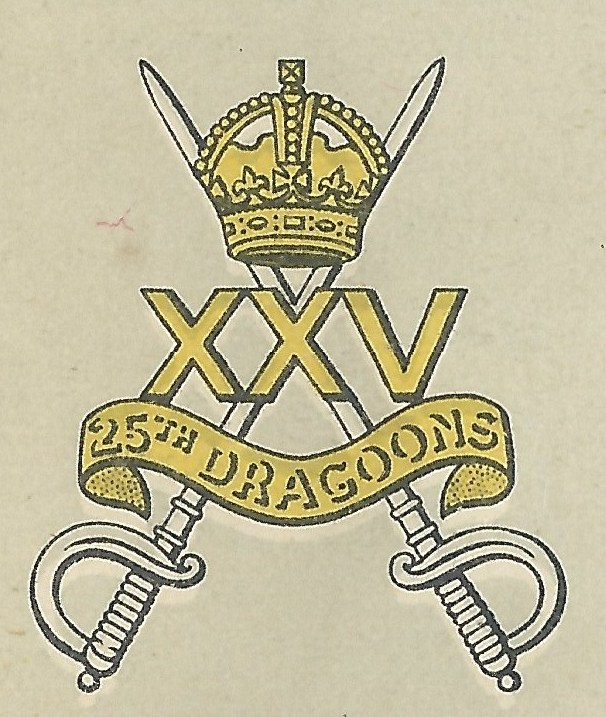
- Cap Badge of the 25th Dragoons ca 1941
- Active: 1941–1947
- Country: United Kingdom
- Branch: British Army
- Type: Cavalry
- Role: Armoured
- Size: Regiment

The 25th Dragoons was a cavalry regiment of the British Army from 1941 to 1947.

== History ==
Previous regiments bearing the number have been:

- De La Bouchetiere's Regiment of Dragoons was re-formed in 1716 as the 25th Dragoons and disbanded in 1718.
- 25th Regiment of (Light) Dragoons was raised for service in India by Colonel Francis Edward Gwyn on 9 March 1794 and renumbered the 22nd Regiment of (Light) Dragoons later that year.

The 1941 regiment was raised in Sialkot, India, in February 1941 from a cadre of personnel taken from the 3rd Carabiniers along with volunteers from infantry regiments. It was initially assigned to the 4th Indian Armoured Brigade (which later became 254th Indian Armoured Brigade and, still later, the 254th Indian Tank Brigade). In 1943, it was reassigned to the Indian XV Corps and transported in great secrecy to Arakan prior to taking part in the Battle of the Admin Box, in which its M3 Grant tanks proved

It spent the remainder of the war in India and Burma. It was part of the 50th Indian Tank Brigade and based in Madras and Bangalore prior to being disbanded in 1947.
