= 48th Royal Tank Regiment =

British World War II military unit

The 48th Royal Tank Regiment (48 RTR) was an armoured regiment of the British Army during the Second World War. It was part of the Royal Tank Regiment, itself part of the Royal Armoured Corps.

It was originally formed as a duplicate of the 42nd Royal Tank Regiment, a newly mobilised Territorial Army unit formerly the 23rd (County of London) Battalion.

It was part of the 21st Army Tank Brigade equipped with Churchill tanks.

During preliminary engagements before the Battle of Longstop Hill in Tunisia, 1943 it disabled a German Tiger I tank; it was sent back to UK and is currently the only operating Tiger tank in the world, Tiger 131.

== History ==
- 1798 Newington Surrey (Sic) Volunteers.
- Loyal Southwark Volunteers
- 1859 7th Surrey Rifles
- (c) 1885 4th Volunteer Battalion The East Surrey Regiment
- 1908 23rd Battalion The East Surrey Regiment
- 1928 23rd London regiment ( The East Surrey Regiment)
- 1937 7th (23rd London) Battalion The East Surrey Regiment
- November 1938 42nd Battalion Royal Tank Corps.
- April 1939 48th Battalion Royal Tank Regiment (R.A.C.)
