= 149th Regiment Royal Armoured Corps =

- Active: 1941–1946
- Country: United Kingdom
- Branch: British Army
- Type: Armoured
- Size: Regiment
- Part of: Royal Armoured Corps
- Equipment: Grant tank Sherman tank
- Engagements: World War II: Battle of Kohima; Battle of Imphal; Battle of Meiktila and Mandalay; Battle of Kyaukmaung Bridgehead; Operation Dracula

149th Regiment Royal Armoured Corps (149 RAC) was an armoured regiment of the British Army's Royal Armoured Corps that served in the Burma Campaign during World War II.

== Origin ==
149th Regiment RAC was formed on 22 November 1941 by the conversion to the armoured role of 7th Battalion of the King's Own Yorkshire Light Infantry (KOYLI). Raised in 1940, 7th KOYLI had been serving with 207th Independent Infantry Brigade (Home), a Home Defence formation in Essex that was broken up in August 1941 and its battalions transferred to the RAC. In common with other infantry units transferred to the Royal Armoured Corps, all personnel, including those transferred in from RAC regiments wore a KOYLI cap badge on the black beret of the RAC.

== Burma Campaign ==
7th KOYLI arrived in India on 24 October 1941, and was assigned for conversion to the Heavy Armoured Brigade, which was soon afterwards redesignated 50th Indian Tank Brigade.

149 RAC moved to the Manipur Road area in April 1944, and came under the command of 254th Indian Tank Brigade in July, with all but one squadron equipped with Grant Mk II tanks, the remaining squadron, equipped with Sherman tanks, was assigned to the infantry school at Dehradun and thus missed Imphal and Kohima. The Shermans were waterproofed and intended for the amphibious assault on the Burma coast that eventually didn't happen.

The Brigade fought with the 5th Indian Division and the 7th Indian Infantry Divisions in Burma and was involved in the Battles at Imphal, Kohima, Kyaumaung Bridgehead, Meiktila, and Rangoon Road.

There is still one of regiment's Grants at Kohima, Major Ezra Rhode's (commander "B" Squadron) tank slid off the road up to Kohima and came to rest part way down with a broken track. It has remained in situ ever since, cared for by the Indians as a memorial. Other Grants eventually made their way up to the top and help clear the tennis court (Sgt Waterhouse) and the district commissioner's bungalow. One of 149th's casualties (Lt P. M. Wood) grave is marked as 149th Regt. RAC, 7th Bn. K.O.Y.L.I.

In August 1944 149 RAC returned to Bombay in India, and then in April 1945 moved to Ahmednagar where it came once again under command of 50th Indian Tank Brigade and remained in India for the remainder of the war.

149 RAC was disbanded in 1946.
