= 21st Army Tank Brigade =

Armoured brigade formation of the British Army

21st Army Tank Brigade 21st Tank Brigade 21st Armoured Brigade
- Formation sign of the 21st Army Tank Brigade during (second pattern).
- Active: 1939–1945
- Country: United Kingdom
- Branch: British Army
- Type: Armoured
- Size: Brigade
- Engagements: Tunisian campaign, Italian Campaign

The 21st Army Tank Brigade was an armoured brigade formation of the British Army active during the Second World War. The brigade served with the British First Army and the British Eighth Army during the fighting in Tunisia and Italy.

== History ==
In 1939, the brigade was a 1st Line Territorial Army Brigade stationed in the United Kingdom. It was assigned to Eastern Command defending the south-eastern portion of the country. Equipment shortages prevented it from receiving any significant numbers of modern tanks; obsolete Vickers Medium Mark II and Mk II Light Tanks comprising most of the armour on hand until after the Battle of Dunkirk. Shortly after that battle, the brigade HQ was pulled back to the Salisbury Plain Training Area, although each tank battalion was detailed as a mobile reserve for the infantry divisions holding the coastline. Each regiment could only form a single mobile squadron, the remaining two serving as infantry.

In August 1940, it began to receive modern Valentine I infantry tanks, the first of what would be a continual change in tanks. Valentine IIs were received from April 1941 and the brigade had about a hundred Churchill tanks on strength by the end of the year. The brigade lost 44th Royal Tank Regiment on 11 September 1940, but 43rd Royal Tank Regiment wasn't assigned until 9 November 1940. 42nd Royal Tank Regiment was transferred away on 12 April 1941 and 43rd Royal Tank Regiment was exchanged for 12th Royal Tank Regiment on 12 April 1941. 145th Regiment Royal Armoured Corps arrived on 15 November 1941. This left the brigade with 12th and 48th Royal Tank Regiment and the 145th Royal Armoured Corps, the units which it would keep for the bulk of the war. The brigade was re-designated as the 21st Tank Brigade on 6 June 1942 when it was assigned to the 4th Infantry Division as part of the British experiment with "Mixed Divisions". A mixed division had one tank brigade with infantry tanks and two non-motorized infantry brigades; the idea being to better coordinate tank and infantry support.

The 4th Division, with the brigade, did not arrive in North Africa until the end of March 1943, although it helped to break open the approaches to Tunis in April. The battle was extremely costly, 48th RTR alone losing 38 Churchills during the fighting, and the mixed division was judged a failure for lack of infantry to fight through difficult country. The division remained behind in North Africa until another infantry brigade could be assembled to replace the 21st Tank Brigade. The brigade was finally relieved of its assignment on 12 December 1943 by the 28th Infantry Brigade, but wasn't transferred to Italy until May 1944. In the meantime, it was reorganized and reequipped with new Churchill V close-support tanks and American-supplied Stuart light tanks replaced the Bren Carriers in its reconnaissance troops. Most of these had their turrets removed. Many of its Churchills had their 6 pdr guns replaced with the QF 75mm gun (which used American 75 mm (3.0 in) ammunition) or simply replaced by guns and their mounts taken from damaged Sherman medium tanks; the latter were known as "Churchill NA75"s. A number of Shermans were put into service by the regiments of the brigade. This gave each regiment a wide variety of tanks in service. For example, in September 1944, 12th RTR had six Churchill I's, six Churchill V's, 23 Churchill III/IV's with the 6-pdr gun, six Churchill NA75s and 12 Shermans.

It remained under the direct command of the Eighth Army after it arrived in Italy until it was subordinated to the I Canadian Corps on 7 July 1944, but saw no action until it supported the Canadian attack on the Gothic Line on 31 August 1944. In December, 48th RTR was temporarily detached to support the 43rd Gurkha Infantry Brigade while 145th RAC was disbanded and replaced by the North Irish Horse.

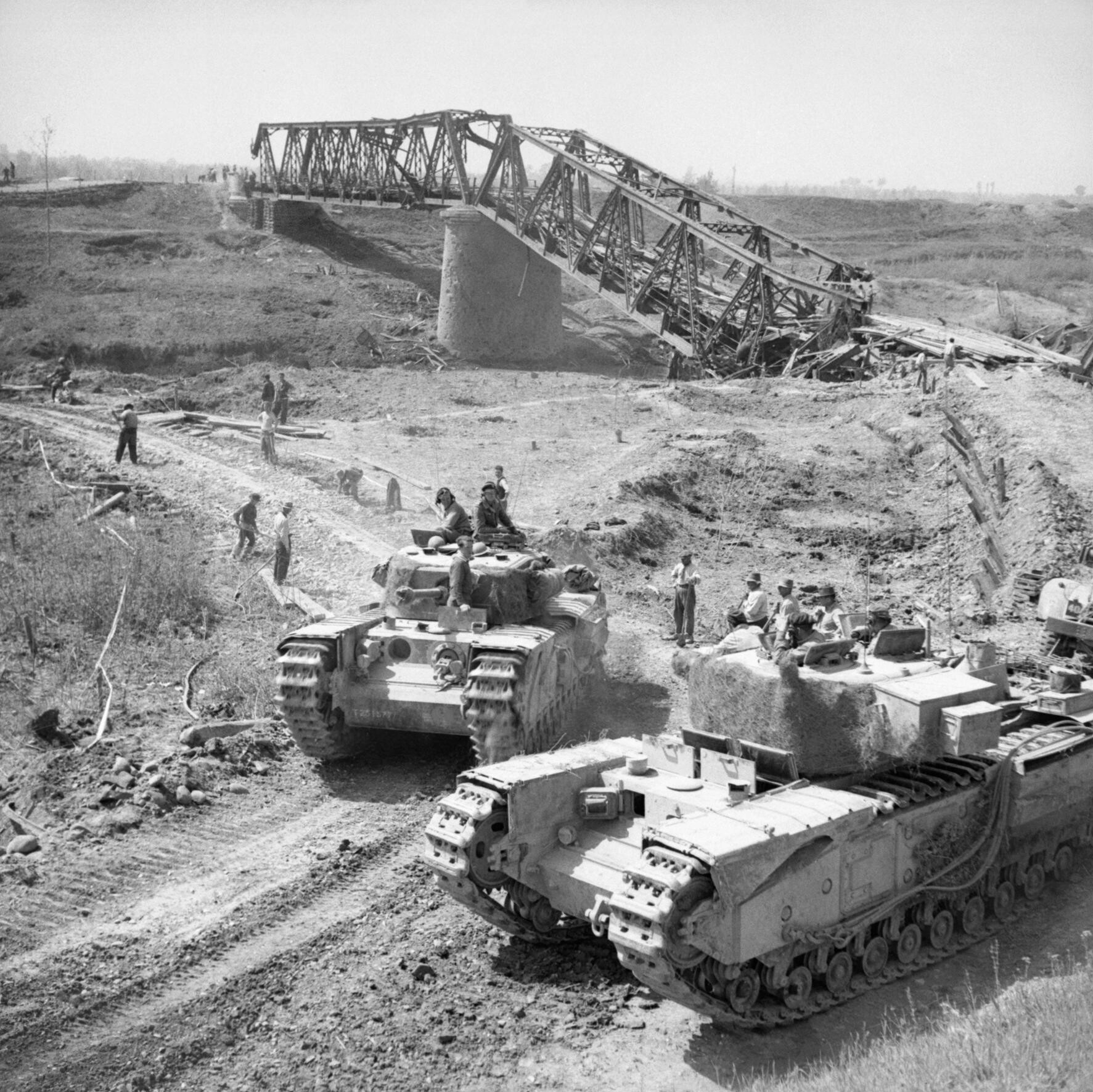
Churchill tanks of 21st Army Tank Brigade cross the River Reno close to a destroyed railway bridge, Italy, 18 April 1945

In January 1945, it began to receive "heavy" Churchill VIIs and converted to an all-Churchill structure. In February, it came under the command of the V Corps and supported its various units during Operation Grapeshot, the Allied offensive in the Po Valley.

On 11 June 1945, it reorganized as the 21st Armoured Brigade.

== Order of battle ==
21st Brigade was constituted as follows during the war:

- 42nd Royal Tank Regiment (until 12 April 1941)
- 44th Royal Tank Regiment (until 11 September 1940)
- 48th Royal Tank Regiment
- 43rd Royal Tank Regiment (from 11 September 1940 until 26 April 1941)
- 12th Royal Tank Regiment (from 26 April 1941)
- 145th Regiment Royal Armoured Corps (from 15 November 1941 until 4 December 1944)
- North Irish Horse (from 4 December 1944)

== See also ==
- British armoured formations of the Second World War
- List of British brigades of the Second World War
- Structure of the British Army in 1939
