= 145th Regiment Royal Armoured Corps =

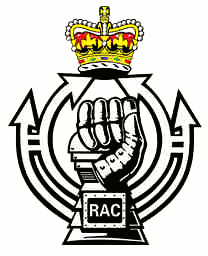
- Badge of the Royal Armoured Corps
- Active: 1941–1944
- Disbanded: December 1944
- Country: United Kingdom
- Branch: British Army
- Type: Armoured Regiment
- Role: Infantry Support
- Part of: Royal Armoured Corps

The 145th Regiment Royal Armoured Corps (8th Duke of Wellington's Regiment) (145 RAC) was an armoured regiment of the British Army's Royal Armoured Corps that served in North Africa, Tunisia and Italy during World War II.

The Duke of Wellington's Regiment's two junior battalions, the 8th Battalion (8 DWR) and the 9th Battalion (9 DWR) were both simultaneously converted into armoured regiments, becoming respectively 145 RAC and 146 RAC.

== Origin ==
145th Regiment RAC was formed in November 1941 by the conversion to the armoured role of 8th Battalion, Duke of Wellington's Regiment, which had been raised in 1940 and was serving in the 203rd Independent Infantry Brigade (Home), a Home Defence formation serving in South West England. In common with other infantry units transferred to the Royal Armoured Corps, all personnel continued to wear their Duke of Wellington's cap badge on the black beret of the Royal Armoured Corps.

== Service ==
145 RAC was assigned to 21st Army Tank Brigade, which sailed for North Africa in March 1943, and took part in the Tunisia Campaign, including the actions on the Medjez Plain in April and around Tunis in May, its Churchill tanks operating as part of a 'mixed division' with 4th Infantry Division.

After a year out of the line in North Africa, 21st Tank Brigade was sent to join British Eighth Army in Italy in May 1944. There it took part in I Canadian Corps' operations to force the Gothic Line (August–September), the Rimini Line (September) and the Lamone Crossing (December). 145 RAC was disbanded in Italy in December 1944.
