= 146th Regiment Royal Armoured Corps =

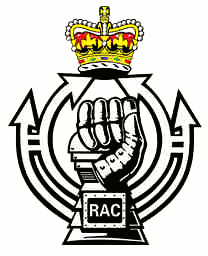
- 146th Regiment Royal Armoured Corps
- Active: From 1941
- Country: United Kingdom
- Branch: British Army
- Type: Armoured Regiment
- Role: Infantry Support
- Part of: Royal Armoured Corps

The 146th Regiment Royal Armoured Corps (9th Duke of Wellington's Regiment) (146 RAC) was an armoured regiment of the British Army's Royal Armoured Corps that served in India, Burma, and Sumatra during and after World War II. 146 RAC survived the war, and was still active in early 1947.

The Duke of Wellington's Regiment's two junior battalions, the 8th Battalion (8 DWR) and the 9th Battalion (9 DWR) were both simultaneously converted into armoured regiments, becoming respectively 145 RAC and 146 RAC.

== Origin ==
146th Regiment RAC was formed on 1 November 1941 by the conversion to the armoured role of 9th Battalion of the Duke of Wellington's Regiment, which had left Liverpool on 28 August 1941 and arrived in Bombay on 25 October 1941, for immediate conversion to the armoured role. In common with other infantry units transferred to the Royal Armoured Corps, all personnel would have continued to wear their Duke of Wellington's cap badge on the black beret of the Royal Armoured Corps.

== Service ==
146 RAC was assigned to 50th Indian Tank Brigade and initially based at Kirkee Barracks in Poona, later moving to Dhond until 13 July 1942, and then Lohardaya (under XV Indian Corps) until 1 January 1943, when the regiment moved to the Ratu-Ranchi area. The various squadrons of the regiment were then split and assigned to different fighting forces across the Burma campaign. The regiment's constituent squadrons had largely regrouped into a regimental formation again by early 1944.

During July 1945 the 254th Indian Tank Brigade, having returned from Burma, became established at Ahmednagar, in Maharashtra State. One of the brigade's constituent units, the 7th Light Cavalry needed to be relieved, and 146 RAC was assigned as the replacement unit.

== Equipment ==
The regiment was assigned Valentine tanks for training purposes, and also used them in combat in its earliest days. By May 1943 the regiment's C squadron had been equipped with the superior M3 Lee tanks and subsequently absorbed B squadron which therefore moved onto M3 Lee tanks as well. By 1944 the M3 Lee was the primary equipment of the regiment, save for A squadron which was then equipped as a light armoured vehicle squadron.

The regiment's 1945 reassignment to 254 Brigade led to the introduction of the Sherman tank, though a report of June 1945 shows that 146 RAC was not considered battle-ready at that stage, having received only 12 Shermans for the entire regiment, and with three quarters of its manpower being new recruits with insufficient training on the vehicles.

== Battles ==
146 RAC was an active participant in the Arakan Campaign, and one of the key combatants of the Battle of Ramree Island in 1945.

== Notable Soldiers ==
Captain Sir Tom Moore served with the regiment from 1941-1945.
