= 42nd Royal Tank Regiment =

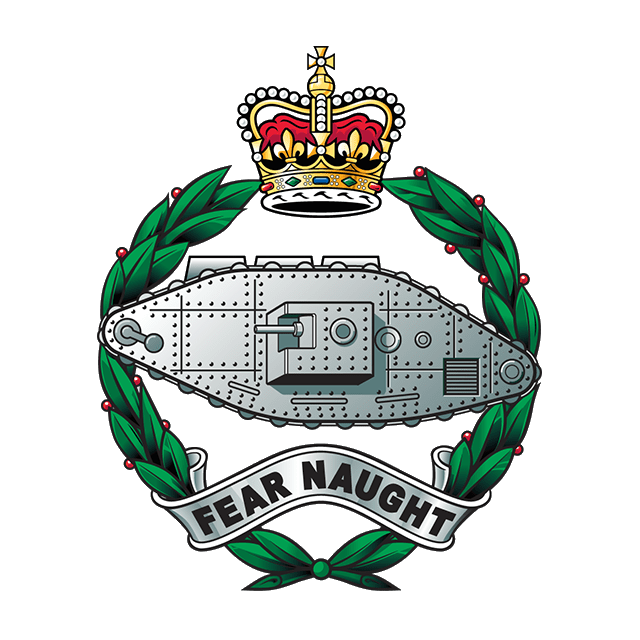
- Cap badge of the Royal Tank Regiment
- Active: November 1938 – October 1956
- Country: United Kingdom
- Branch: British Army
- Type: Armoured
- Size: One regiment
- Part of: Royal Armoured Corps
- Motto: Fear Naught
- March: Quick: "My Boy Willie" (all RTR regiments); Slow: "The Royal Tank Regiment Slow March"

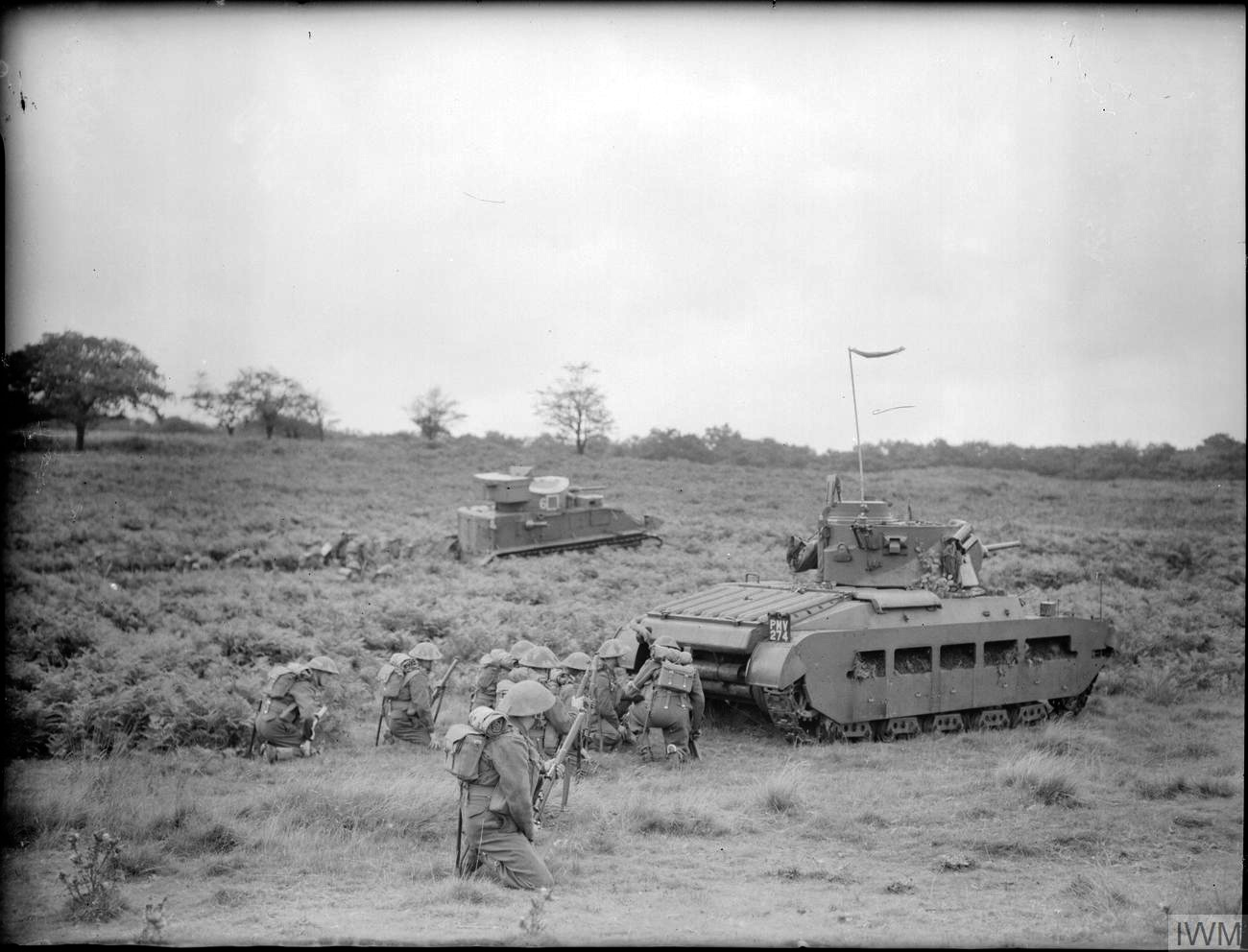
Troops of the King's Shropshire Light Infantry shelter behind a Matilda II tank of 42 RTR during manoeuvres at Knowsley Park, Prescot, 30 July 1940

The 42nd Royal Tank Regiment (42 RTR) was an armoured regiment of the British Army from 1938 until 1956. It was part of the Royal Tank Regiment, itself part of the Royal Armoured Corps.

== Mobilisation ==
The unit was formed on 1 November 1938 by converting the 7th (23rd London) Battalion, East Surrey Regiment, a Territorial Army (TA) infantry battalion, into a tank unit. For a short while it was 42nd (7th (23rd London) Battalion, East Surrey Regiment) Battalion of the Royal Tank Corps before the corps was redesignated the Royal Tank Regiment in 1939.

== World War II ==
The regiment was mobilised on the outbreak of war on 3 September 1939 as part of 21st Army Tank Brigade, composed of three TA battalions of the Royal Tank Regiment.

The unit formed part of 1st Army Tank Brigade in 1941–42, serving with it in the Western Desert Campaign including the Second Battle of El Alamein.

For the invasion of Northern Europe in 1944, it was equipped with Canal Defence Light Grant tanks. These were not used in battle.

== Postwar ==
From 1947, when the TA was reconstituted, the regiment was in 22nd Armoured Brigade under the 56th (London) Infantry Division.

In 1956, the regiment was converted back to infantry, becoming the 23rd London again.
