= 8th Royal Tank Regiment =

Dissolved British tank regiment

The 8th Royal Tank Regiment (8 RTR) was an armoured regiment of the British Army until 1960. It was part of the Royal Tank Regiment, itself part of the Royal Armoured Corps. It originally saw action as H Battalion, Tank Corps in 1917.

In the North African campaign it was part of 23rd Armoured Brigade

In 1960, it amalgamated with 5th Royal Tank Regiment.
