= 8th Armoured Division (United Kingdom) =

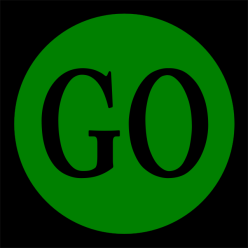
- 8th Armoured Division insignia
- Active: 4 November 1940 – 1 January 1943
- Country: United Kingdom
- Branch: British Army
- Type: Armoured
- Size: Division, 13,235 men 130+ tanks (Note: The division was initially organised on Basic Organisation No. III (340 tanks) but on arrival in the Middle East was partially reorganised along the lines of Basic Organisation No. IV; depending on the tanks used, resulting in 44 or 48 tanks per regiment at full strength. However, owing to casualties within Middle East Command, the change to Basic Organisation No. IV was never completed.) (Note: This is the war establishment, the on-paper strength, of the division for 1942; for information on how divisions changed over the war, please see British Army during the Second World War and British Armoured formations of World War II.)

Commanders
- Notable commanders: Sir Richard McCreery

The 8th Armoured Division was an armoured division of the British Army during the Second World War. It was deployed to Egypt in June 1942 but never operated as a complete formation and was disbanded in January the following year.

== History ==
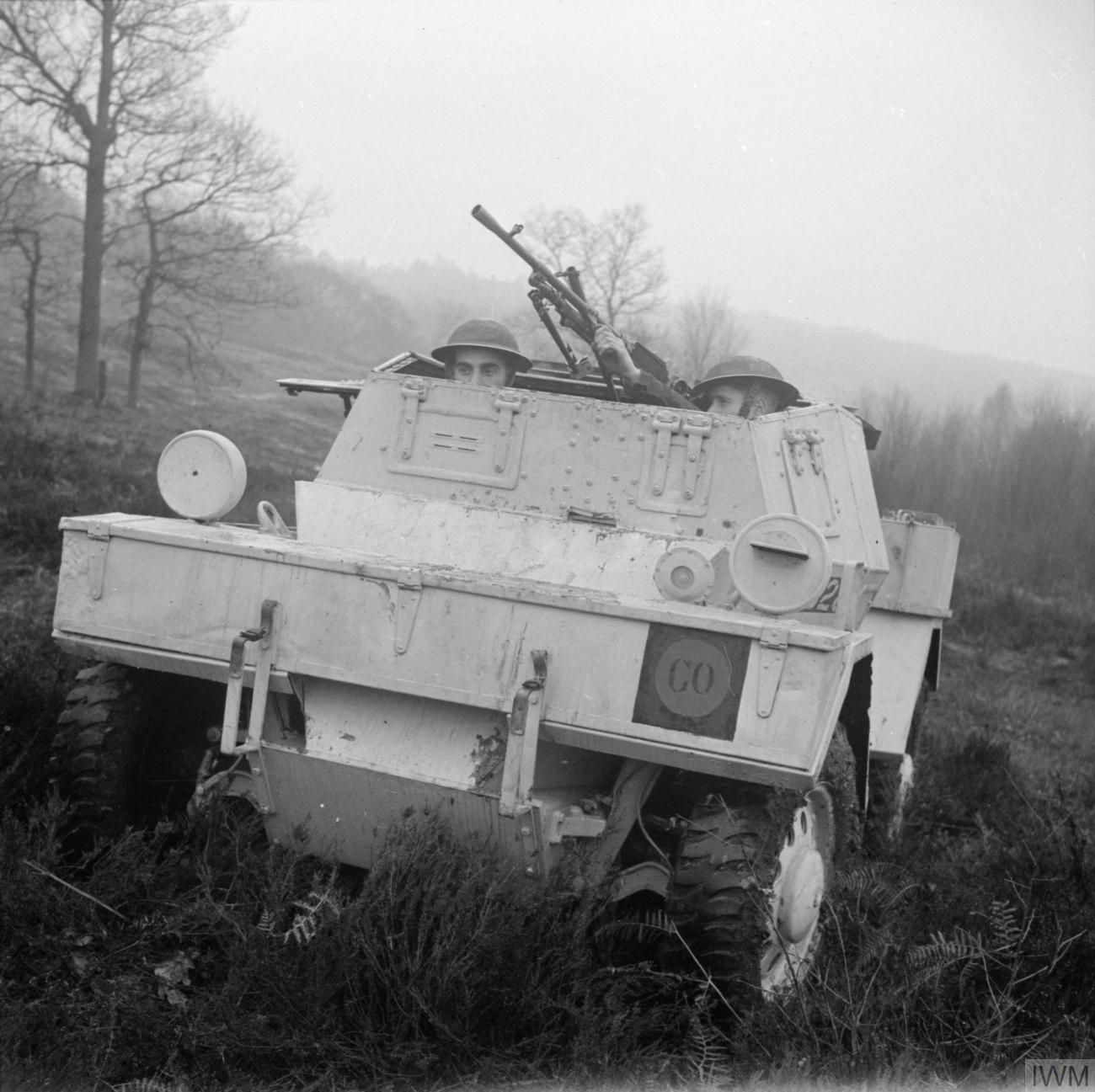
Scout car of the 40th (The King's) Royal Tank Regiment, 8th Armoured Division, at Warren Camp, Crowborough in Sussex, 22 December 1941. The regiment was about to embark for the Middle East, hence the desert camouflage.

The division was sent to North Africa but never saw active service as a complete formation. As the division could not be provided with a lorried infantry brigade, it was broken up and was finally disbanded in Egypt on 1 January 1943.

Following the Second Battle of El Alamein a plan was put forth to use the remains of the division as a self-contained pursuit force to dart forward into the German-Italian rear as far as possibly Tobruk, however the plan to use the division was shelved and units in the forward area were used instead. Afterwards, the name of the division was used for the purpose of military deception.

== Order of battle ==
The units which formed part of the division included (day/month/year). Worth to note, in the six months the division was in Egypt, it never operated as a complete formation. Order of battle was:

- 8th Armoured Division Headquarters
- 8th Armoured Division Signals, Royal Corps of Signals 4/11/40–16/12/42
- 2nd Derbyshire Yeomanry 27/11/40–20/8/42
- 23rd Armoured Brigade 22/11/40–11/7/42
  - 23rd Armoured Brigade Headquarters
  - 23rd Armoured Brigade Signal Troop, Royal Signals
  - 40th (The King's) Royal Tank Regiment
  - 46th (Liverpool Welsh) Royal Tank Regiment
  - 50th Royal Tank Regiment
  - 1st Battalion, The London Rifle Brigade later 7th Battalion, The Prince Consort's Own (Rifle Brigade) (London Rifle Brigade)
- 24th Armoured Brigade 22/11/40–10/10/42 then 31/10/42–6/11/42
  - 23rd Armoured Brigade Headquarters
  - 23rd Armoured Brigade Signal Troop, Royal Signals
  - 41st (Oldham) Royal Tank Regiment
  - 45th (Leeds Rifles) Royal Tank Regiment
  - 47th (Oldham) Royal Tank Regiment
  - 1st Battalion, The Queen's Westminsters later 11th (Queen's Westminsters) Battalion, The King's Royal Rifle Corps
- 8th Support Group 7/11/40–23/7/42
  - 8th Support Group Headquarters Detachment
  - 14th Battalion, The Derbyshire and Nottinghamshire Regiment (Sherwood Foresters)
  - 5th Regiment, Royal Horse Artillery (Field) 19/9/42–11/11/42
  - 73rd Anti-Tank Regiment, Royal Artillery 25/9/42–26/10/42 (part of Hammerforce, see above)
  - 56th (East Lancashire) Light Anti-Aircraft Regiment, Royal Artillery 23/7/42–6/11/42 (part of Hammerforce, see above)
- CRA, 8th Armoured as HQ Hammerforce from 18/10/42–3/11/42 (see below for units)
- Commander Royal Artillery, 8th Armoured Division (HQ Hammerforce, see above)
  - HQ Commander Royal Artillery
  - CRA Signal Troop, Royal Signals
  - 5th Regiment, Royal Horse Artillery (Field) 19/9/42–11/11/42
  - 11th (Honourable Artillery Company) Regiment, Royal Horse Artillery (Field) 12/8/42–20/8/42
  - 104th (Essex Yeomanry) Regiment, Royal Horse Artillery (Field) 13/9/42–26/9/42 (part of Hammerforce, see above)
  - 146th (Pembrokeshire and Cardiganshire) Field Regiment, Royal Artillery 19/9/42–6/11/42 (part of Hammerforce, see above)
  - 73rd Anti-Tank Regiment, Royal Artillery 25/9/42–26/10/42 (part of Hammerforce, see above)
  - 56th (East Lancashire) Light Anti-Aircraft Regiment, Royal Artillery 23/7/42–6/11/42 (part of Hammerforce, see above)
  - CRA Medical Section, Royal Army Medical Corps
- Commander Royal Engineers, 8th Armoured Division
  - HQ Divisional Engineers
  - Divisional Engineers Signal Troop, Royal Signals
  - 6 Field Squadron, Royal Engineers 27/11/40–9/11/42
  - 9 Field Squadron, Royal Engineers 15/1/41–11/7/42 then 15/9/42–9/11/42
  - 145 Field Park Squadron, Royal Engineers 27/11/40–9/11/42
  - Divisional Engineers 'B' Light Aid Detachment, Royal Army Ordnance Corps (from 43 Royal Electrical and Mechanical Engineers)
- 8th Armoured Division Service Battalion, Royal Army Service Corps
- 8th Armoured Division Maintenance Battalion, Royal Army Ordnance Corps (later Royal Electrical and Mechanical Engineers from 1943)
- 8th Armoured Division Field Ambulance, Royal Army Medical Corps
- 8th Armoured Division Military Police Company, Corps of Royal Military Police

== Commanders ==
Commanders of the brigade included:

- (Acting) Brigadier Arthur George Kenchington 4/11/40–14/12/40
- Major General Richard Loudon McCreery 14/11/40–15/10/41
- Major General Charles Wake Norman 15/10/41–24/8/42
- Major General Charles Henry Gairdner 24/8/42–1/1/43

== See also ==
- List of British divisions in World War II
- British Armoured formations of World War II

== Notes ==
Footnotes

Citations
