= The Liverpool Welsh =

39th (Liverpool Welsh) Lancashire RVC 46th (Liverpool Welsh) Royal Tank Regiment 653rd (Liverpool Welsh) HAA Regiment, RA 533rd (Liverpool Welsh) HAA Regiment, RA
- Active: 1860–1862; 1939–1956
- Country: United Kingdom
- Branch: Volunteer Force/Territorial Army
- Role: Infantry; Armour; Heavy Anti-Aircraft Artillery
- Part of: King's Liverpool Regiment; 23rd Armoured Brigade
- Garrison/HQ: Liverpool
- Engagements: Western Desert Campaign; Sicily Campaign; Italian Campaign; Anzio; Greek Civil War

The Liverpool Welsh, under various guises, was a unit of Britain's Volunteer Force and Territorial Army (TA) associated with the King's Liverpool Regiment. It served as a tank regiment in the Western Desert and Italian Campaigns in the Second World War, as a security force during the Greek Civil War, and as a heavy anti-aircraft artillery regiment postwar.

== Volunteers ==
The enthusiasm for the Volunteer movement following an invasion scare in 1859 saw the creation of many Rifle Volunteer Corps (RVCs) composed of part-time soldiers eager to supplement the Regular British Army in time of need. One such unit was the 39th (Liverpool Welsh) Lancashire RVC formed in the city of Liverpool on 9 February 1860 under the auspices of the Welsh Literary Society, following public meetings held in November 1859. The unit comprised clerks and bookkeepers and had an instalment plan so that less affluent members could purchase the necessary uniform (Volunteer grey with red facings) and pay the annual subscription. The unit elected its own officers, even though this was discouraged by the authorities. It consisted of a single company, drilling at the Welsh School in Russell Street, though a sub-division was later formed at Everton. It had a storehouse at 37 Russell Street and undertook musketry training at the Altcar Rifle Range. As a small corps the unit was included in the 2nd Administrative Battalion of Lancashire RVCs, which was consolidated as the 5th (Liverpool Rifle Volunteer Brigade) Lancashire RVC in March 1862, with the Liverpool Welsh forming No 5 (Welsh) Company.

The Liverpool Rifle Volunteer Brigade eventually became the 6th (Rifles) Battalion, King's Regiment (Liverpool) in the Territorial Force.

== Second World War ==
=== Mobilisation ===
As part of the modernisation of the Territorial Army (TA) in the years leading up to the Second World War, 7th Battalion King's Regiment (Liverpool) at Bootle was converted into 40th (The King's) Royal Tank Regiment (40th RTR) in 1938. After the Munich Crisis the TA was doubled in size, with existing units forming duplicates in 1939. The duplicate of 40th (King's) RTR was 46th (Liverpool Welsh) Royal Tank Regiment in Liverpool.

Together with 40th RTR and 50th RTR (from Bristol) the regiment comprised 23rd Army Tank Brigade, based in Liverpool and serving in Western Command. The TA was embodied for active service at the outbreak of war on 3 September 1939. The brigade's title was changed to 23rd Armoured Brigade in November 1940 when it became part of a new 8th Armoured Division forming in Northern Command.

=== Western Desert ===
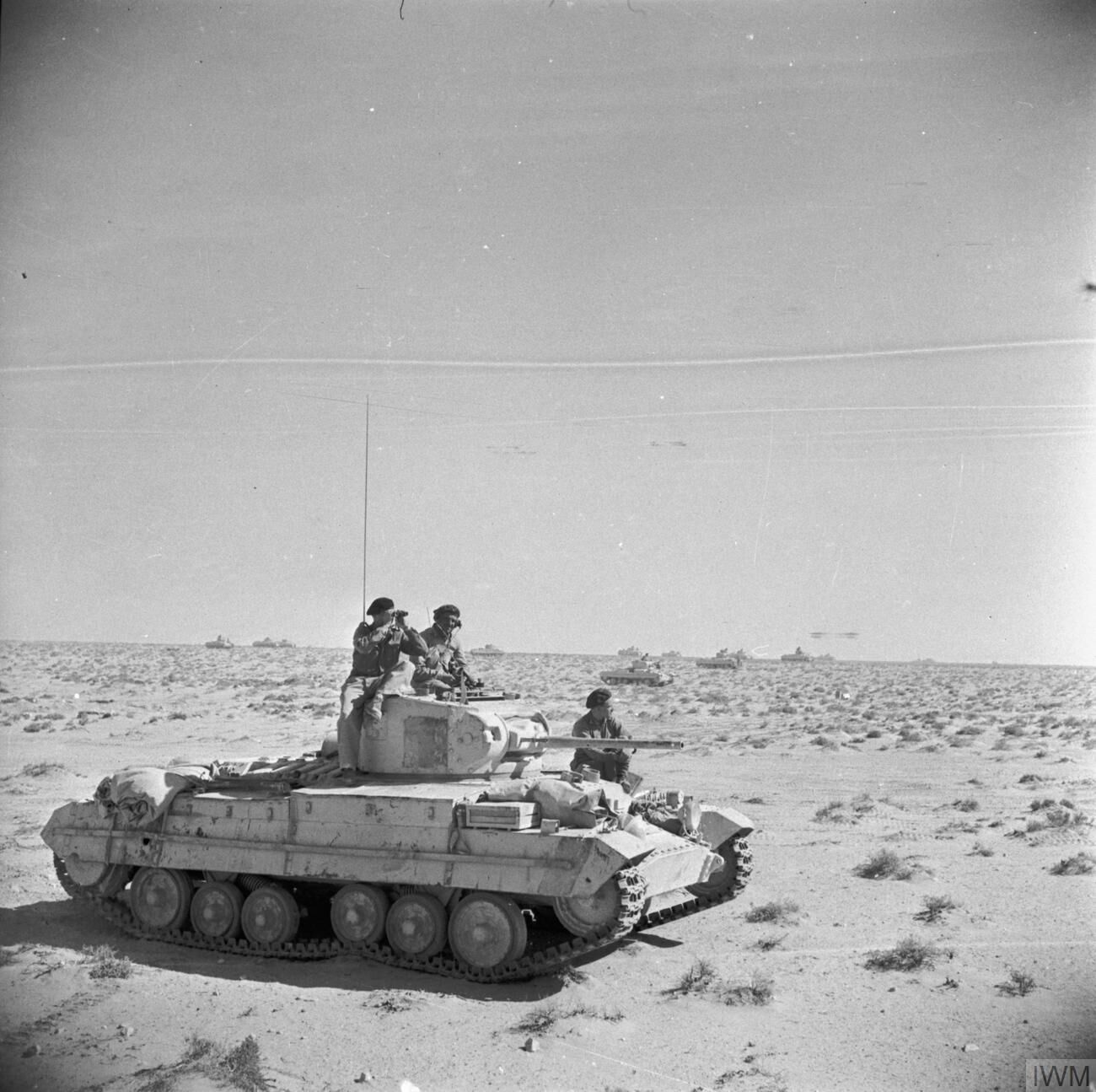
A Valentine tank in the Western Desert, summer 1942.

8th Armoured Division embarked in May 1942 for the Middle East, 23rd Armoured Bde arriving at Suez in Egypt on 6 July. However, all the tanks had to go through the Base Ordnance Workshops, where considerable work had to be done on them. The brigade had received its tanks (44 Valentines and 6 Close Support Matildas for each armoured regiment) by 17 July, but they still had defects and deficiencies when they went into action five days later.

Because much of 8th Armoured Division had not arrived, 23rd Armoured Brigade was organised as an independent brigade group attached to 1st Armoured Division. Without any desert training, and in the unfamiliar role of 'Infantry tanks', it was given a task in the second phase of Eighth Army's attack on El Mreir (the Second Battle of Ruweisat Ridge). Although the previous night's operations had not fully cleared the minefield to their front, 23rd Armoured Bde advanced promptly at 08.00 on 22 July, the appearance of 40th and 46th RTR 'thundering past' distracting the German defenders of Point 63, who were captured by 1st Bn 2nd Punjab Regiment. 46th RTR advanced on the left, but struck the minefield and came under shell and anti-tank fire. After losing 13 tanks, the squadrons fanned out; some joined the equally shattered 40th RTR, some tried to work south of the El Mreir depression and were never seen again. At 11.00 the remains of the two regiments were counter-attacked by 21st Panzer Division and were ordered to withdraw. 'This gallant and disastrous action, on its first day of action cost the Brigade 203 casualties, with about 40 tanks destroyed and 47 badly damaged' [out of two regiments].

23rd Armoured Bde was in reserve for the Battle of Alam el Halfa on 31 August, and as the German Panzer attack developed, Gen Bernard Montgomery put it at the disposal of Lt-Gen Brian Horrocks' XIII Corps'. By 13.00 100 Valentines of the brigade had moved into the gap between 1st New Zealand Division and 22nd Armoured Bde and strengthened the position on the Alam el Halfa ridge. One squadron of 46th RTR supported 132nd Infantry Bde in an attempted counter-stroke at 22.30 on the night of 3/4 September. Unfortunately, 132nd Bde was nearly an hour late crossing its start line, and the New Zealanders had already attacked. 'The enemy was by then thoroughly aroused and met the advancing infantry with machine-gun and mortar fire. There was much straggling and general confusion, which took some time to sort out'. Rather than leave the troops in a very exposed position, the attackers were withdrawn before dawn. The Germans pulled back over the next few days.

23rd Armoured Bde was in XXX Corps' Reserve for the Second Battle of El Alamein, but in practice each of its regiments was assigned to one of the attacking divisions. When the assault went in on the night of 23/24 October most of the infantry and tanks got held up by mines short of their final objective line ('Oxalic'), but they had overcome the forward defences and lanes were being swept through the main minefields The following days saw the 'dogfight' that Montgomery had predicted. On the night of 28/29 October the 9th Australian Division put in another set-piece attack. 46th RTR supported 26th Australian Brigade, with some of the infantry riding into battle on the Valentines. But the darkness, dust, and scattered mines frustrated the attempt to rush the enemy position. The tanks came under anti-tank and machine-gun fire, forcing the infantry to dismount and lose touch with the tanks. There was confused fighting, after which the infantry dug in, supported by the seven Valentines of 46th RTR that were still running (the regiment's casualties that night were 15 tanks knocked out, and many more damaged, but all were later recovered). Although the attack had fallen short of its ambitious objectives, it had punched a hole between 21st Panzer Division and 90th Light Division, effectively destroying II Bn of 125th Panzer Grenadier Regiment and a battalion of Italian Bersaglieri.

After Alamein, 23rd Armoured Bde remained in Egypt to refit and did not take part in the pursuit. In December some of its units set off across North Africa, but 46th RTR was left behind, officially leaving the brigade on 1 December 1942. It remained in Egypt as part of Middle East Forces until after the conclusion of the Tunisian Campaign.

=== Sicily ===
46th RTR returned to 23rd Armoured Bde on 28 June 1943 in time for the Allied invasion of Sicily (Operation Husky). The brigade landed on Sicily on 10 July supporting XXX Corps, 46th RTR following 50th RTR in. On 12 July, as XXX Corps exploited its beachhead, the tanks advanced with 51st (Highland) Division through the ruins of Palazzolo Acreide and a group including two squadrons of 46th RTR reached the slopes facing the hill town of Vizzini by evening. The tanks demonstrated against Vizzini the following day until troops of 51st (H) Division arrived to begin the attack. The full attack went in at 01.00 the following morning to find that the defenders had retired. 51st H Division and 23rd Armoured Bde continued to advance north towards Paternò against strengthening resistance, especially by units of the Hermann Goring Division around Gerbini Airfield. On the night of 20/21 July 7th Bn Argyll & Sutherland Highlanders attacked the airfield, covered by a squadron of 46th RTR, and captured it after three hours. But in fierce counter-attacks with infantry and tanks the enemy retook it by 10.30 the following morning. The squadron of 46th RTR lost eight tanks, including the squadron commander, Maj John Routledge, killed, and 51st (H) Division was forced onto the defensive. The division renewed its advance on the night of 31 July/1 August, working round Adrano and the west side of Mount Etna, as the Axis defenders were shepherded out of Sicily by 17 August.

=== Italy ===
23rd Armoured Brigade took part in the Salerno landings (Operation Avalanche) on 9 September, but 46th RTR was not in the leading waves that operated for some days as a composite force defending the beachhead and then led the dash for Naples. During October, the brigade advanced behind 7th Armoured Division. It then crossed to the Adriatic coast of Italy and joined V Corps. On 3 November it supported 78th Division's attack on Vasto held by 16th Panzer Division. At 04.30 two squadrons of 46th RTR helped 5th Bn Buffs (Royal East Kent Regiment) and 6th Bn Royal Inniskilling Fusiliers to ascend the slope towards San Salvo. Although the advance seemed slow, it penetrated between two German battalions and the tanks pinned down II Bn 2nd Panzer Regiment. During the afternoon III Bn 2nd Panzer Regiment attempted a counter-attack but was stopped by 46th RTR and 'flailed' by the British artillery, after which the Germans withdrew to the Sangro River and the Gustav Line.

=== Anzio ===
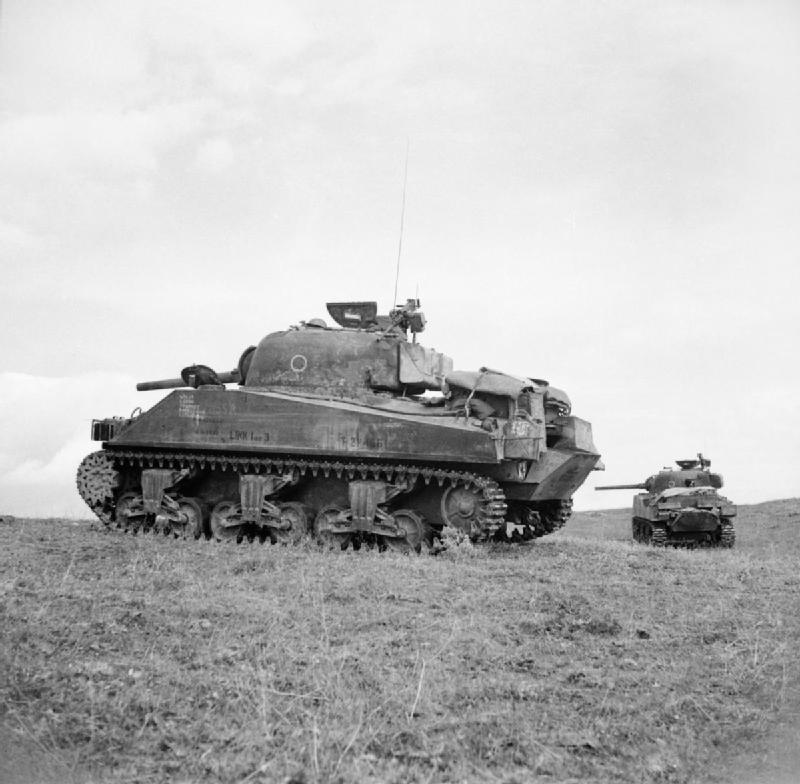
Sherman tanks of 46th Royal Tank Regiment provide fire support for men of 1st Battalion, Loyal Regiment (North Lancashire) at Anzio, 25 January 1944.

The main campaign now bogged down during the winter of 1943/44. 46th RTR left 23rd Armoured Bde on 4 January 1944 and was attached to 1st Division, which was the British contribution to the Anzio landing (Operation Shingle). The division landed on 'Peter' Beach unopposed on 22 January and completed its unloading by the following morning. On 24 January it probed forward towards Albano. On 30 January 1st Division began its advance up the Via Anziate towards Campoleone, with 3rd Brigade accompanied by 46th RTR. At 15.15 1st Bn King's Shropshire Light Infantry (KSLI) on the right of the Via Anziate, 1st Bn Duke of Wellington's Regiment on its left, with B Sqn 46th RTR, began their advance, all went well to start with; the objectives were secured by 18.00 and the battalions consolidated. Next day, 2nd Bn Sherwood Foresters renewed the advance at 10.30 with C Sqn 46th RTR. Approaching a railway embarkment the infantry took heavy casualties from machine guns. Although they captured the embankment, it hindered the tanks, and the advance stalled. By the end of the two days 46th RTR had lost 11 Shermans. In the evening of 3 February the Germans began a series of counter-attacks to eliminate the Campoleone salient, and came close to cutting it off. In the afternoon of 4 February a reinforcing battalion, 1st Bn London Scottish was sent up with two squadrons of 46th RTR to keep open the Via Anziate. This 'most determined attack was successful', and the respite allowed 3rd Bde to be pulled back from the most dangerous positions. Faced by strong enemy forces, 1st Division had to prepare defences, with the battered 3rd Bde and 46th RTR in reserve.

The expected German counter-offensive began at 21.00 on 7 February. The first attack was brought to a standstill after tough fighting, then 3rd Bde counter-attacked towards the Buonriposo ridge with the KSLI and Foresters, supported by a squadron of 46th RTR. Although both battalions made some ground their losses were so high that they were stopped in insecure positions below the ridge. German attacks continued until 11 February when 1st Division was reinforced by US troops, and the fighting died down. There were further flare-ups throughout February, but a Trench warfare stalemate set in at Anzio after 3 March. The breakout from Anzio began on 23 May, simultaneously with attacks northwards by Eighth Army and US Fifth Army. By 22 July, 46th RTR had rejoined 23rd Armoured Bde, which was resting and refitting in Palestine, and remained under its command until the end of the war.

=== Greece ===
On 19 August 1944, 23rd Armoured Bde under Brigadier Robert Arkwright was designated Force 140 and reorganised as an infantry brigade group for security duties in Greece (Operation Manna) should the Germans there withdraw. 46th RTR was split up into one squadron equipped with armoured cars, and two squadrons organised as infantry, one attached to 40th RTR and the other to 50th RTR (which were both organised as infantry). Force 140 was renamed 'Akforce' on 2 September and moved from Palestine to Egypt on 6 September.

The German withdrawal from Greece was well advanced by October, and Operation Manna began on 12 October with parachute landings by 2nd Parachute Bde. The following day Arkforce with troops and jeeps set sail from Alexandria aboard the cruisers HMS Ajax, HMS Aurora and HMS Black Prince, and began landing at Piraeus on 16 October. From 19 October 23rd Armoured Bde began operating ashore as a component of Arkforce).

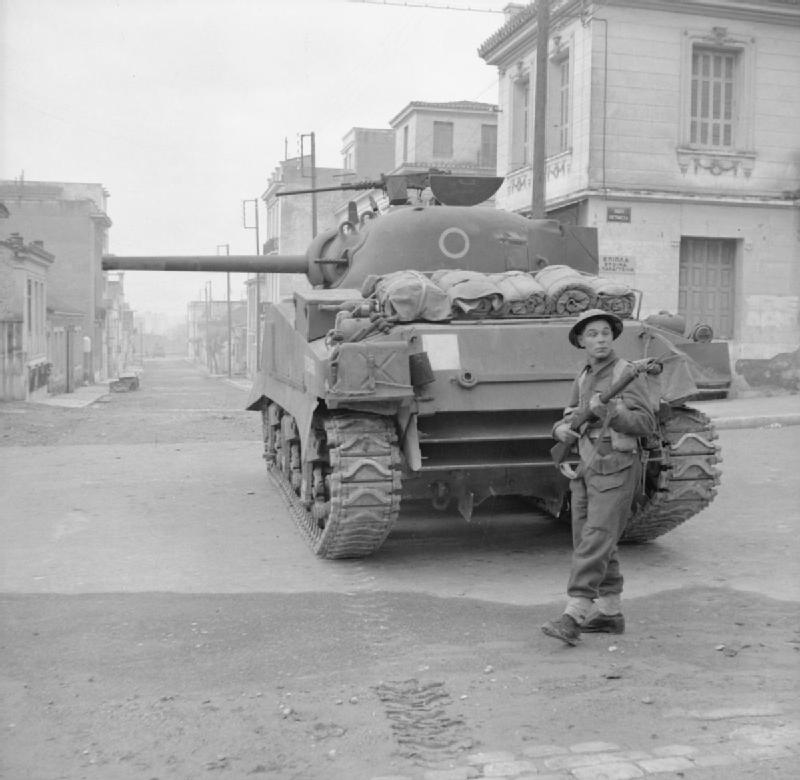
An infantryman acts as 'tail end charlie', protecting the commander of a Sherman tank from ELAS snipers in Athens, 18 December 1944.

23rd Armoured Bde's role was to 'show the flag' in Athens, disarm the Greek security battalions established under German occupation, open up ports for relief supplies, and generally to act as arbitrators in local disputes. The units used their own transport to take supplies to outlying villages. However, in December the former partisans of the Greek People's Liberation Army (ELAS) refused to be disarmed and clashes broke out with their rivals of the National Republican Greek League (EDES), the so-called Dekemvriana. On 5 December Arkforce was ordered to clear ELAS out of the Athens–Piraeus area. 46th RTR was based at a barracks about 1 mile north of Lykabettos in the north of Athens, one squadron equipped with tanks that had now arrived, and one squadron with armoured cars. The operation began the next day, with two tank troops from 46th RTR assisting the 3rd Greek Mountain Brigade in clearing the Kouponia suburb. But ELAS strength continued to build up, and Arkforce was hard pressed to keep open communications with the government offices in Constitution Square and the base at Faliron Bay. 46th RTR's tanks were in constant demand for infantry support in the streets, while its scout cars and armoured command vehicles were organised into 'The Athens Taxi Service' to ferry senior officers and officials to and from Faliron past the ELAS-held Fix Brewery. The force commander, Lt-Gen Ronald Scobie, urgently requested reinforcements, including 35 additional Shermans to re-equip 46th RTR as a complete armoured regiment.

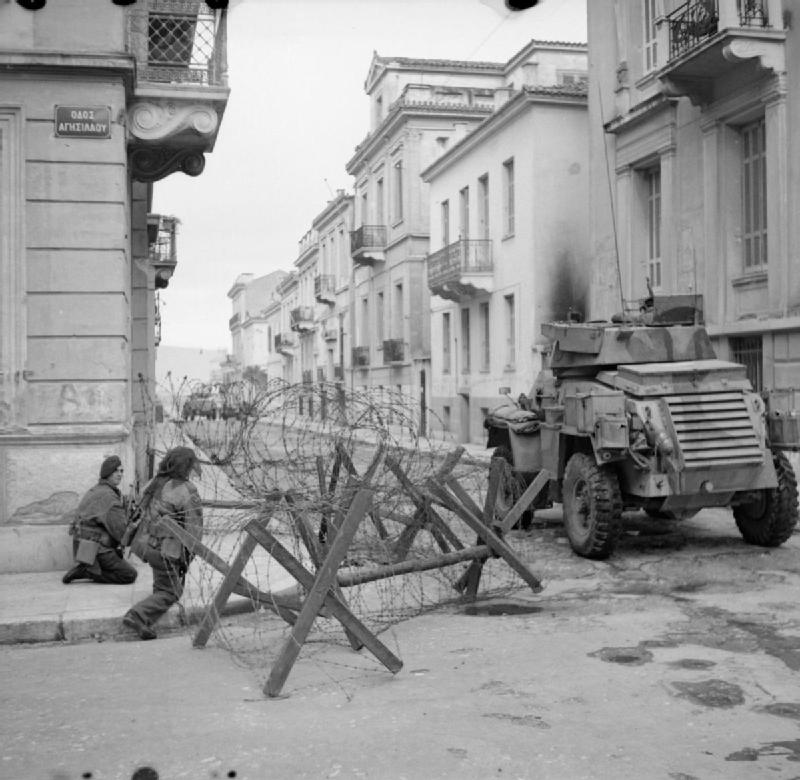
A Humber armoured car supports paratroops during operations against ELAS in Athens, 6 January 1945.

Operations from 9 to 17 December developed into a grim battle for the centre of Athens, while other troops fought to reopen the Piraeus docks. Arkforce was forced to abandon commitments outside the city, including withdrawing 46th RTR's administrative echelon from the Military Academy, where it had come under attack. Two of the regiment's armoured cars of the 'Athens Taxi Service' transported Gen Alexander and the British Minister, Harold Macmillan safely from the airfield to headquarters. They found the British force 'beleaguered' in the city with only three days' ammunition. However, the arrival of reinforcements by air and sea, including the first of the extra Shermans, allowed the force to keep open the lines of communication to the airfield and port, and a full corps HQ arrived to take over from Arkforce. The reinforcing infantry ('Blockforce') cleared the Piraeus peninsula with the help of 46th RTR's tanks to break down barricades. On the night 12/13 December ELAS made a converted effort to take the Constitution Square enclave, but the defenders held out. Supplies were scarce and nightly convoys up and down the Faliron road had to be escorted by the overworked tanks. However, by the night of 17/18 December operations began to advance up the road and link up the British positions, and bitter fighting went on into the new year. ELAS began withdrawing from central Athens on 27 December, and the British started an offensive on 2 January 1945, Arkforce striking northwards with 23rd Armoured Bde. ELAS retreated from Athens on 5 January, although fighting went on in other parts of the country.

46th (Liverpool Welsh) RTR remained in Greece until demobilisation after the end of the Second World War.

== Postwar ==
When the TA was reconstituted in 1947, the regiment reformed in the Royal Artillery (RA) as 653rd (The Liverpool Welsh) Heavy Anti-Aircraft Regiment, with headquarters at Bluebell Lane, Huyton, Liverpool. In 1950 it amalgamated with 533rd Light Anti-Aircraft/Searchlight Regiment, RA, also based in Liverpool, to form 533rd (The Liverpool Welsh) Heavy Anti-Aircraft Regiment. In 1955 this in turn was merged into the Liverpool-based 368th (4th West Lancashire) Medium Regiment, RA, in which it formed Q (Liverpool Welsh) Battery. The Liverpool Welsh title disappeared the following year when 368th Medium Regiment was amalgamated into its former parent regiment, 359th (4th West Lancashire) Medium Regiment.

== External sources ==
- British Army units from 1945 on
- Commonwealth War Graves Commission
- Orders of Battle at Patriot Files
- Land Forces of Britain, the Empire and Commonwealth – Regiments.org (archive site)
