= 23rd Armoured Brigade (United Kingdom) =

23rd Army Tank Brigade 23rd Armoured Brigade Force 140 Arkforce
- Liver bird formation sign of the 23rd Armoured Brigade.
- Active: 1939–1946
- Country: United Kingdom
- Branch: British Army
- Type: Armoured
- Size: Brigade
- Engagements: Second World War * Western Desert Campaign * Tunisian Campaign * Italian Campaign

Commanders
- Notable commanders: Robert Arkwright

Insignia
- Formation sign of the unit as an Army Tank Brigade.

The 23rd Armoured Brigade, originally formed as the 23rd Army Tank Brigade, was an armoured brigade of the British Army that saw service during the Second World War. The brigade was a 2nd Line Territorial Army (TA) formation. It was reorganised and renamed the 23rd Armoured Brigade, when it was assigned to the 8th Armoured Division, although it never operated under command of the division.

== Mobilisation ==
The brigade was formed as the 23rd Army Tank Brigade on the outbreak of the Second World War as a 2nd Line Territorial Army (TA) formation, under the command of Brigadier W. F. Murrogh. The brigade had only a few light armoured vehicles during its existence as an Army Tank Brigade. It was reorganised and renamed the 23rd Armoured Brigade on 1 November 1940, when it was assigned to the new 8th Armoured Division (Major General Richard McCreery). As part of the reorganisation it was reinforced with the 1st Battalion, London Rifle Brigade, this motorised infantry battalion was renamed the 7th Battalion, Rifle Brigade (The Prince Consort's Own) on 19 January 1941. It began to receive significant numbers of tanks as a consequence of its assignment to the 8th Armoured Division, deliveries of the close-support version of the Matilda II and Valentine tanks beginning about that same time. By November 1941, the brigade had approximately 18 Matildas and 120 Valentines.

== North Africa ==
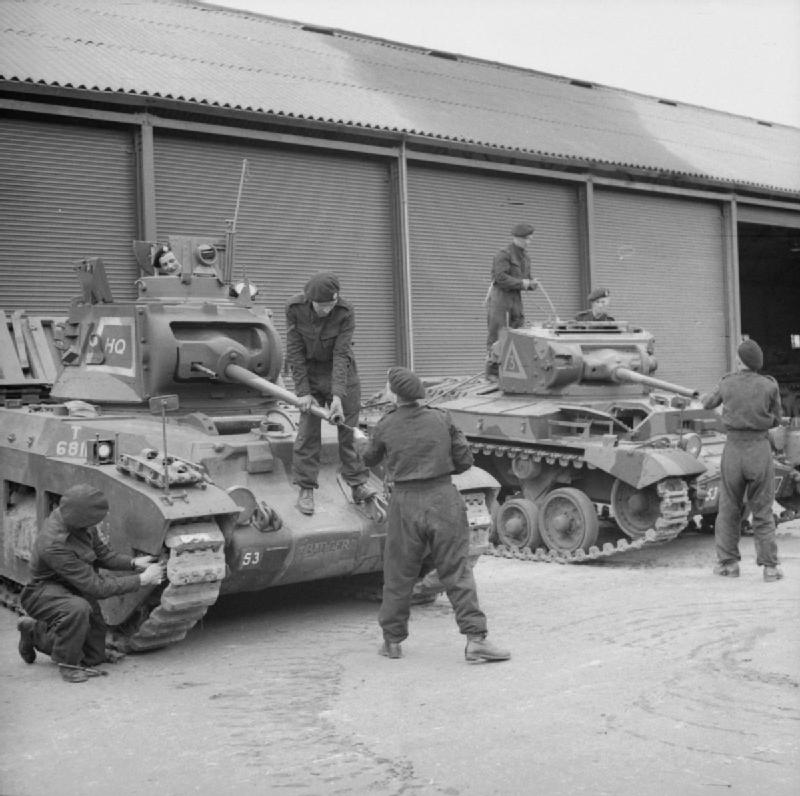
A Matilda tank and a Valentine of the 40th (The King's) Royal Tank Regiment being 'bulled up' at Crowborough in Sussex for a 'Speed the Tanks' parade in London, 28 July 1941.

The division remained in Britain until May 1942 when it was sent to the Middle East to join the Eighth Army, becoming active there in early July. In mid-July the brigade, now commanded by Brigadier L. E. Misa, was detached from the 8th Armoured Division and with the addition of the 5th Regiment, Royal Horse Artillery became known as the 23rd Armoured Brigade Group.

=== First Alamein ===
After only 14 days of acclimatisation and without any infantry support training, the brigade was chosen to reinforce an attack by XXX Corps during the Second Battle of Ruweisat Ridge, part of the First Battle of El Alamein. The regiments failed to locate lanes cleared by the leading units through Axis minefields and were virtually annihilated by German anti-tank fire while in the minefield. The brigade had mustered 122 Valentines and 18 Matildas for the attack but at day's end, had lost 116 tanks; the tank crews suffered 44 per cent killed or wounded.

=== Alam el Halfa ===
The brigade was rebuilt by cannibalising men and tanks from the newly arrived 24th Armoured Brigade and it was retrained as an infantry support unit, although it was not renamed an Army Tank Brigade. On 11 August 1942, the 7th Battalion, Rifle Brigade (The Prince Consort's Own) was transferred to the 7th Motor Brigade, then part of the 7th Armoured Division but later became part of the 1st Armoured Division. During the Battle of Alam el Halfa in September, the brigade was initially in XXX Corps reserve but was transferred to the 10th Armoured Division, XIII Corps.

=== Second Alamein ===
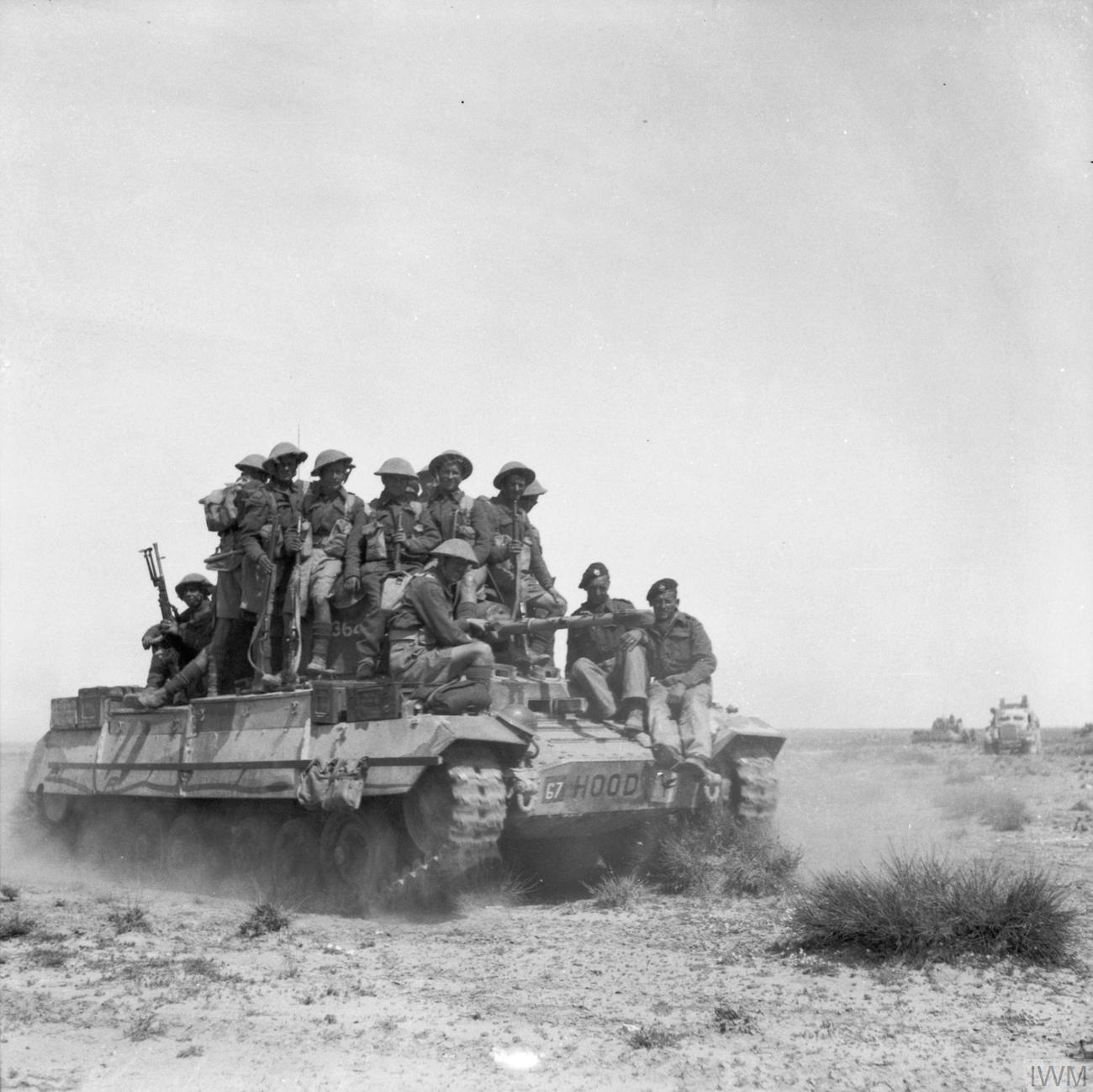
A Valentine tank of the 50th RTR carries infantrymen of the 5th Battalion, Black Watch during an exercise, 12 March 1943.

Before the Second Battle of El Alamein, the brigade was reinforced by the addition of the 8th Royal Tank Regiment to a strength of about 186 Valentines; the 5th RHA was exchanged for the 107th Field Regiment, Royal Artillery, with sixteen Bishop self-propelled guns. During that battle, most of the regiments supported the infantry divisions of XXX Corps. The 8th RTR was attached to the 1st South African Division, 40th RTR was attached to the 9th Australian Division and the 50th RTR was attached to 51st (Highland) Division. The brigade suffered heavily during the battle and it remained in Egypt to refit and reorganise. The 8th RTR was transferred to Palestine in early November, after having turned over its surviving tanks while the 46th RTR was removed from the brigade, as was 107th Field Regiment.

=== Tunisia ===
In December 1942, elements of the brigade, now with the 11th (Queen's Westminsters) Battalion, King's Royal Rifle Corps (KRRC) under command, began to move forward but it saw no combat until it entered Tunisia on 17 February 1943. In the Tunisian Campaign the brigade served as an independent armoured formation under XXX Corps, Eighth Army and fought in most of the battles of the campaign. On 3 May, the 50th RTR was withdrawn to convert to M4 Sherman tanks. After the campaign, the 46th RTR was reassigned to the brigade, although it was still converting to Shermans and the 40th RTR began to convert to the new tank.

== Sicily ==
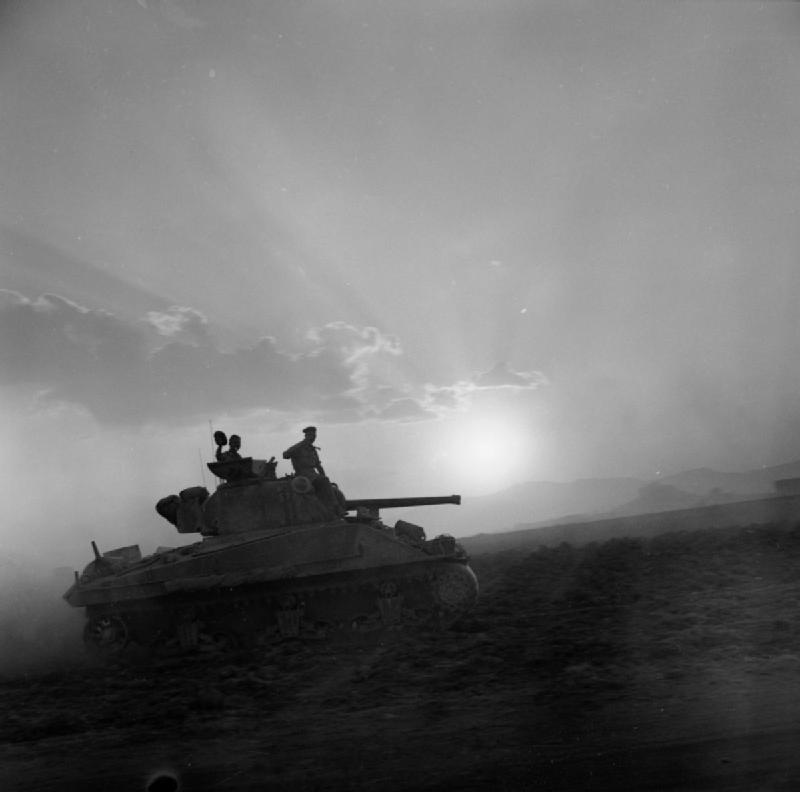
A Sherman tank of 'A' Squadron, 50th Royal Tank Regiment, silhouetted by the setting sun, Sicily, 1 August 1943.

The 23rd Armoured Brigade took part in the Allied invasion of Sicily (Operation Husky) in July 1943, although only the 50th RTR and B Squadron of the 46th RTR participated in the initial landings. The remainder of the 46th RTR was still converting to Shermans and did not land in Sicily until 23 July. The brigade did not fight as a unit in Sicily, its units being detached to support other formations. the brigade historian commented that "Sicily was the hardest, the bloodiest, and above all, the most disillusioning campaign in which the brigade had served during the war". The two regiments of the brigade had a short rest before the next operation.

== Italy ==
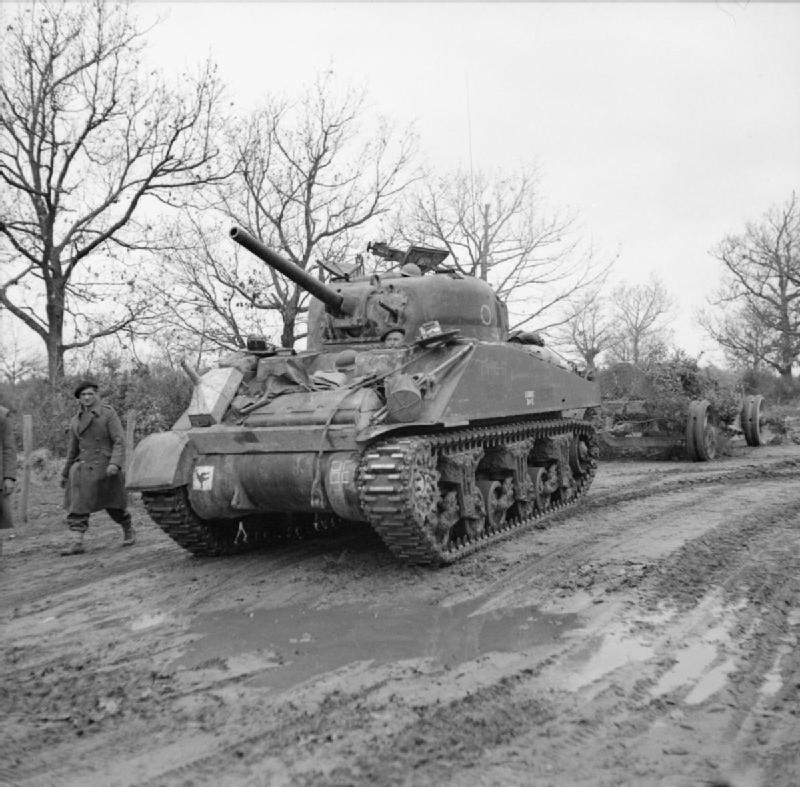
A Sherman tank of the 46th Royal Tank Regiment towing a German 155 mm gun, captured by the 2nd Battalion, North Staffordshire Regiment, 23 January 1944. The gun was a French piece of First World War French vintage.

Only the 40th RTR participated in the initial landings at Salerno during Operation Avalanche, part of the Allied invasion of Italy, which began the Italian Campaign. It was assigned to the British 46th Infantry Division. The brigade, now under Brigadier Robert Arkwright, took command of various units from the British X Corps and the US VI Corps during the big German counterattacks of 12 to 14 September, to defend the boundary between the two armies. It commanded American and British units up through the occupation of Naples on 1 October 1943. By October, the brigade had consolidated once more and had joined X Corps, containing the 7th Armoured Division, the 46th and 56th Infantry Division, on the left wing of the US Fifth Army, taking part in the fighting from the Volturno Line to the Winter Line (Gustav Line).

In early January 1944, the 46th RTR was detached from the brigade to come under command of the British 1st Infantry Division for the Battle of Anzio landings (Operation Shingle) and rejoined the brigade in July. In March 1944 the brigade was transferred to the British V Corps which had a holding role on the eastern side of the Gustav Line by the Adriatic Sea while the Eighth and Fifth Armies combined to launch Operation Diadem in the Cassino sector. The Allies finally broke the German defences there after three unsuccessful attempts in the Battle of Monte Cassino since January.

== Arkforce ==
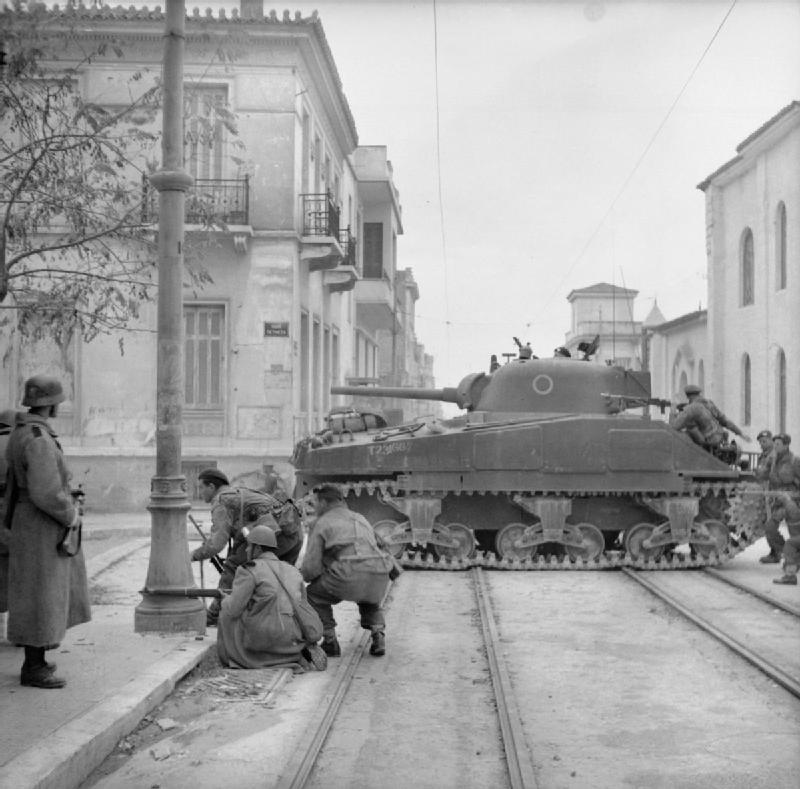
British Sherman tank and paratroops, together with Greek troops, fighting ELAS in Athens, 18 December 1944.

In late May 1944, the brigade was withdrawn from Italy and returned to Egypt. In August 1944, the brigade was renamed Force 140, later Arkforce after its commander, Brigadier Arkwight and was dismounted from its tanks. The 40th and 50th RTR were retrained as infantry while 46th RTR was reorganised with one squadron of armoured cars and one squadron of infantry, this being attached to the 50th RTR but kept one squadron of Shermans. Arkforce arrived at Piraeus on 12 October 1944 as part of the British occupying force in Greece when the Germans withdrew. It participated in the repression of the Greek People's Liberation Army (ELAS) during the Greek Civil War (the Dekemvriana). Arkforce was disbanded on 8 January 1945 and the 23rd Armoured Brigade regained its name and had its tanks restored by the end of January. It remained in Greece beyond VE Day until the end of the Second World War.

== Second World War Order of battle ==
The 23rd Armoured Brigade was constituted as follows during the war:

- 40th (The King's) Royal Tank Regiment
- 46th (Liverpool Welsh) Royal Tank Regiment (left 1 December 1942, rejoined 28 June 1943, left 4 January 1944, rejoined again 22 July 1944)
- 50th Royal Tank Regiment
- 1st Battalion, London Rifle Brigade (from 2 November 1940 until 18 January 1941)
- 7th Battalion, Rifle Brigade (The Prince Consort's Own) (from 19 January 1941 until 11 August 1942)
- 11th (Queen's Westminsters) Battalion, King's Royal Rifle Corps (from 4 November 1942)
- 23rd Armoured Brigade Signal Squadron, Royal Corps of Signals

== Brigade Commanders ==
The following officers commanded the 23rd Armoured Brigade during the war:

- Brigadier W. F. Murrough (until 16 December 1941)
- Brigadier L. E. Misa (from 16 December 1941 until 31 July 1942)
- Brigadier G. W. Richards (from 31 July 1942 until 23 July 1943)
- Brigadier R. H. B. Arkwright (from 23 July 1943 until 4 December 1944)
- Brigadier R. A. Hermon 4 December 1944 (acting, from 4 December 1944 until 8 January 1945)
- Brigadier R. H. B. Arkwright (from 8 January until 1 April 1945)
- Colonel R. A. Hermon 1 April 1945 (acting, from 1 to 22 April 1945)
- Brigadier R. H. B. Arkwright (from 22 April 1945)

== Postwar ==
The brigade was disestablished in May 1946 but when the TA was revived on 1 January 1947 it reformed as an independent Armoured Brigade in Western Command with the following organisation:.

- Cheshire Yeomanry, RAC, at Chester
- Staffordshire Yeomanry, RAC, at Stafford
- 40th (The King's) Royal Tank Regiment at Bootle
- 41st (Oldham) Royal Tank Regiment at Oldham
- 304 Signal Squadron (Armoured Brigade), RCS, at Chester
- The Liverpool Scottish (motorised infantry) at Liverpool

The brigade was finally disbanded in the late 1950s.

== See also ==
- British Armoured formations of World War II
- List of British brigades of the Second World War
- British Army Order of Battle (September 1939)
