= 10th Armoured Division (United Kingdom) =

WW2 British Army formation

- Formation sign of the 10th Armoured Division.
- Active: 1 August 1941 – 15 June 1944; 1956–1957
- Country: United Kingdom
- Branch: British Army
- Type: Armoured
- Size: Second World War; 13,225–14,964 men 186 tanks (Note: 164 M4 Shermans, 8 cruisers, and 14 anti-aircraft tanks.) (Note: These figures are the war establishment, the on-paper strength, of the division for 1942–1944; for information on how divisional sizes changed over the war please see British Army during the Second World War and British Armoured formations of Second World War.)
- Garrison/HQ: Western Desert; Tripoli
- Engagements: North African Campaign
- Battle honours: 30 August–7 September 1942 Alam el Halfa; 23 October–4 November 1942 El Alamein

Commanders
- Notable commanders: Alexander Gatehouse

The 10th Armoured Division was an armoured formation of the British Army, raised during the Second World War and was active from 1941–1944 and after the war from 1956–1957. It was formed from the 1st Cavalry Division, a 1st Line Yeomanry unit of the Territorial Army (TA) which had been serving in Palestine. The division was converted from cavalry to armour and renamed from 1 August 1941.

== History ==
The divisional sign was a fox's mask, representing the hunting tradition of the formation's cavalry and Yeomanry units. The division was originally under command of HQ British Troops Palestine and Transjordan, but transferred to Ninth Army when the headquarters was redesignated on 1 November 1941. It was later transferred into Egypt, serving under HQ Middle East, XXX Corps, British Eighth Army, and X Corps. The division fought at the Battles of Alam Halfa and El Alamein. It was disbanded on 15 June 1944 in Egypt.

The 10th Armoured Division was also briefly active after the war ended in Libya in the 1950s, incorporating 25th Armoured Brigade, but was disbanded in July 1957. The 25th Armoured Brigade was formed in 1952 to provide an operational headquarters for the troops in Libya. Also 1st RTR & 3rd RHA in Canal Zone, Egypt 1954/56 (Not listed on Orbat site). The Royal Scots Greys arrived in Libya in 1952, and stayed until 1955. Other units of the brigade from 1952 were the 4th/7th Royal Dragoon Guards, 1st Battalion, Grenadier Guards, 1st Battalion, East Surrey Regiment, 3rd Regiment, Royal Horse Artillery and the 14th/20th King's Hussars. Also the Queens Bays at Sabratha 5th Royal Tank Regiment became part of 25th Armd Bde Gp in Cyrenaica from December 1954 to March 1957 .

In May and June 1956 the brigade was hastily expanded to division status as 10th Armoured Division, with the intention of invading Egypt from the west during the Suez Canal Crisis. Planning was halted when it was found that such an invasion was banned under the terms of Britain's treaty with Libya. The Armoured Brigade Signals Squadron was expanded to 10th Armd Div Signals in May–June 1956, based in Tripoli. It began to wind up in April 1957, and disbanded completely in September 1957.

From 1948 to 1957 22 Engineer Regiment was in Libya, with a short stint in Egypt in October 1951 . It was under the command of 1st Infantry Division and 10th Armoured Division.

5th Royal Inniskilling Dragoon Guards was at Wavell Barracks, Benghazi from December 1965, operating armoured cars, with "A" Squadron at Ziyyi Camp in Cyprus, until the end of 1967.

== General Officer Commanding ==
| Appointed | General Officer Commanding |
| 1 August 1941 | Major-General John Clark (Note: Joslen states a Major-General C.G.W. Clark was the division's first General Officer Commanding whereas Mead informs the reader that John Clark retained control of the division after it was reformed as an armoured division.) |
| 26 June 1942 | Major-General Alexander Gatehouse |
| 18 December 1942 | Major-General Charles Norman |
| 12 January 1943 | Major-General Horace Birks |
| 1955 | Major-General Rodney Moore |

== Order of battle ==
The 10th Armoured Division was constituted as follows during the war:

8th Armoured Brigade (left 16 February 1942, rejoined 27 March 1942, left 30 June 1942, rejoined 17 July 1942, left 21 November 1942)

- Sherwood Rangers Yeomanry
- Staffordshire Yeomanry
- Royal Scots Greys (left 30 June 1942)
- 3rd Royal Tank Regiment (from 12 July 1942)
- 1st Battalion, Buffs (Royal East Kent Regiment) (from 14 March 1942)

9th Armoured Brigade (from 9 October 1941, left 25 March 1942, rejoined 14 November 1942, left 27 May 1943)

- Royal Wiltshire Yeomanry (left 27 May 1943)
- Warwickshire Yeomanry (left 27 May 1943)
- 1st Household Cavalry Regiment (from 3 August, left 9 October 1941)
- Yorkshire Hussars (from 10 October 1941, left 13 March 1942)
- 3rd The King's Own Hussars (from 16 March 1942, left 27 May 1943)
- 14th Battalion, Sherwood Foresters (from 10 August, left 9 December 1942)
- 11th (Queen's Westminsters) Battalion, King's Royal Rifle Corps (from 9 December 1942, left 27 May 1943)

7th Armoured Brigade (from 3 June 1943, left 11 April 1944)

- 7th Queen's Own Hussars (from 15 December 1943)
- 2nd Royal Tank Regiment
- 6th Royal Tank Regiment (from 8 June 1944)
- 8th Royal Tank Regiment (from 29 January 1944)
- 2nd Battalion, Rifle Brigade (The Prince Consort's Own) (from 26 September 1943 until 13 November 1943, rejoined 19 December 1943)

23rd Armoured Brigade (from 1 June 1944, left 14 June 1944)

- 40th (The King's) Royal Tank Regiment
- 46th (Liverpool Welsh) Royal Tank Regiment
- 50th Royal Tank Regiment
- 11th (Queen's Westminsters) Battalion, King's Royal Rifle Corps

7th Motor Brigade (from 12 September 1942, left 23 September 1942)

- 2nd Battalion, King's Royal Rifle Corps
- 2nd Battalion, Rifle Brigade (The Prince Consort's Own)
- 7th Battalion, Rifle Brigade (The Prince Consort's Own)

133rd Lorried Infantry Brigade (from 29 September 1942, left 25 November 1942)

- 2nd Battalion, Royal Sussex Regiment
- 4th Battalion, Royal Sussex Regiment
- 5th (Cinque Ports) Battalion, Royal Sussex Regiment

201st Guards Motor Brigade (from 9 January 1943, left 1 February 1943)

- 6th Battalion, Grenadier Guards
- 3rd Battalion, Coldstream Guards
- 2nd Battalion, Scots Guards

Divisional Troops

Royal Armoured Corps

- 1st Household Cavalry Regiment (from 9 October 1941, left 13 March 1942, rejoined 14 January 1943, left 5 November 1943)
- 2nd Derbyshire Yeomanry (from 21 August 1942, left 10 September 1942)
- 1st The Royal Dragoons (from 22 September 1942, left 31 October 1942)
- 7th Queen's Own Hussars (from 5 November 1943, left 25 April 1944)

Royal Engineers

- 2nd Field Squadron, Royal Engineers (from 21 November 1941, left 10 June 1943)
- 3rd Field Squadron, Royal Engineers (from 22 September 1942, left 15 May 1944)
- 622nd Field Squadron, Royal Engineers (from 11 June 1943, left 31 May 1944)
- 141st Field Park Squadron, Royal Engineers (from 20 November 1941, left 1 April 1944)
- 6th Bridging Troop, Royal Engineers (from 20 November 1943, left 1 April 1944)

Royal Corps of Signals

10th Armoured Divisional Signals, Royal Corps of Signals

Royal Artillery

- 1st Regiment, Royal Horse Artillery (from 13 September 1942, left 27 May 1943, rejoined 13 November 1943, left 25 April 1944)
- 14th Regiment, Royal Horse Artillery (from 3 June 1943, left 8 November 1943)
- 104th (Essex Yeomanry) Regiment, Royal Horse Artillery (from 27 September 1942, left 3 May 1944)
- 98th Field Regiment, Royal Artillery (from 19 September 1942, left 29 December 1942)
- 84th Anti-Tank Regiment, Royal Artillery (from 13 September 1942, left 20 May 1944)
- 53rd (King's Own Yorkshire Light Infantry) Light Anti-Aircraft Regiment, Royal Artillery (from 2 September 1942, left 2 November 1942)
- 101st Light Anti-Aircraft Regiment, Royal Artillery (from 11 November 1943, left 30 April 1944)

== See also ==
- List of British divisions in World War II
- British Armoured formations of World War II

== Notes ==
Footnotes

Citations
