= 24th Armoured Brigade (United Kingdom) =

24th Army Tank Brigade 24th Armoured Brigade
- Active: 3 September 1939 – 1 March 1943
- Country: United Kingdom
- Allegiance: British Crown
- Branch: British Army
- Type: Armoured
- Size: Brigade
- Part of: Northern Command; 8th Armoured Division; 10th Armoured Division
- Engagements: Western Desert campaign Second Battle of El Alamein

The 24th Army Tank Brigade was an armoured brigade of the British Army. It was embodied in the United Kingdom at the outbreak of the Second World War. On 1 November 1940, it was redesignated as the 24th Armoured Brigade and reorganized. In July 1942, it transferred to Egypt and took part in the Western Desert campaign, notably the Second Battle of El Alamein. The Headquarters was disbanded in the Middle East on 1 March 1943.

== Original formation ==
The 24th Army Tank Brigade was a Territorial Army (TA) Tank brigade of the British Army, one of four Army Tank Brigades in the TA in 1939. (Note: The other three were 21st Army Tank Brigade, 23rd Army Tank Brigade and 25th Army Tank Brigade.) It was embodied in the United Kingdom on 1 September 1939 at the outbreak of the Second World War, commanding 41st, 45th and 47th Royal Tank Regiments (41st, 45th and 47th RTR) of the TA. It remained in the UK under Northern Command throughout its existence. On 1 November 1940 it was redesignated as the 24th Armoured Brigade and reorganized.

The reorganization saw the addition of a motor battalion – 1st Battalion, Queen's Westminsters – to provide motorized infantry support to the Brigade. On 22 November 1940, the Brigade joined 8th Armoured Division. With the division, it left the UK on 8 May 1942, arriving in Egypt on 8 July – the long sea journey being due to transiting via the Cape of Good Hope. 8th Armoured Division was destined never to operate as a complete formation; at this time, for tactical reasons, the battle formation in the Middle East became the Brigade Group and the division would now operate as two Brigade Groups. Along with the 23rd Armoured Brigade, the brigade was reorganised on 30 August as the 24th Armoured Brigade Group with three armoured regiments, a motor battalion, an artillery regiment, an anti-tank battery, a light anti-aircraft battery and various other support units.

The brigade's most notable action was in the Battle of El Alamein from 23 October to 4 November 1942. For the battle, the brigade was attached to 10th Armoured Division and equipped with 2 Grants, 93 Shermans and 45 Crusaders for a total of 140 tanks. On the night of 24/25 October, the brigade took part in the unsuccessful thrust by 10th Armoured Division from Miteirya Ridge. The leading unit, 8th Armoured Brigade, was caught on their start line at 22:00 – zero hour – by an air attack and were scattered. 24th Armoured Brigade had pushed forward and reported at dawn they were on the Pierson line, although it turned out that, in the dust and confusion, they had mistaken their position and were well short. On 27 October, the brigade supported the 2nd Battalion, Rifle Brigade's attack on Outpost Snipe. The brigade was soon in contact with the Rifle Brigade (having shelled them in error for a while). Some hours of confused fighting ensued involving tanks from the Littorio Armoured Division and troops and anti-tank guns from 15th Panzer Division which managed to keep the British armour at bay in spite of the support of the Rifle Brigade battlegroup's anti-tank guns.

After the battle, the brigade's officers and men were progressively posted away to other units over the succeeding months. In December, 11th Battalion, King's Royal Rifle Corps was posted to 23rd Armoured Brigade, and 41st RTR was replaced by the 2nd Royal Gloucestershire Hussars (2nd RGH), formerly of 22nd Armoured Brigade. The remaining units were placed in suspended animation: (Note: "suspended animation" was used to describe units that continued to exist but without personnel or equipment.) 47th RTR in December 1942, 2nd RGH in January 1943, and 45th RTR in March 1943. The Headquarters was disbanded in the Middle East on 1 March 1943.

=== Commanders ===
The 24th Army Tank / Armoured Brigade had the following commanders:

From	Rank	Name
3 September 1939	Brigadier	K.E.S. Stuart
19 September 1940	Brigadier	A.G. Kenchington
21 November 1942	Colonel	R.B. Shepperd (acting)
22 December 1942	Brigadier	A.G. Kenchington

=== Component units ===
The 24th Army Tank / Armoured Brigade commanded the following units during its existence:

From	To	Unit
3 September 1939	9 December 1942	41st (Oldham) Royal Tank Regiment
3 September 1939	28 February 1943	45th (Leeds Rifles) Royal Tank Regiment
3 September 1939	15 January 1943	47th (Oldham) Royal Tank Regiment
1 December 1940	31 January 1941	1st Battalion, Queen's Westminsters (Note: 1st Battalion, Queen's Westminsters was redesignated as 11th Battalion, King's Royal Rifle Corps on 1 February 1941.)
1 February 1941	3 December 1942	11th Battalion, King's Royal Rifle Corps
9 December 1942	15 January 1943	2nd Royal Gloucestershire Hussars

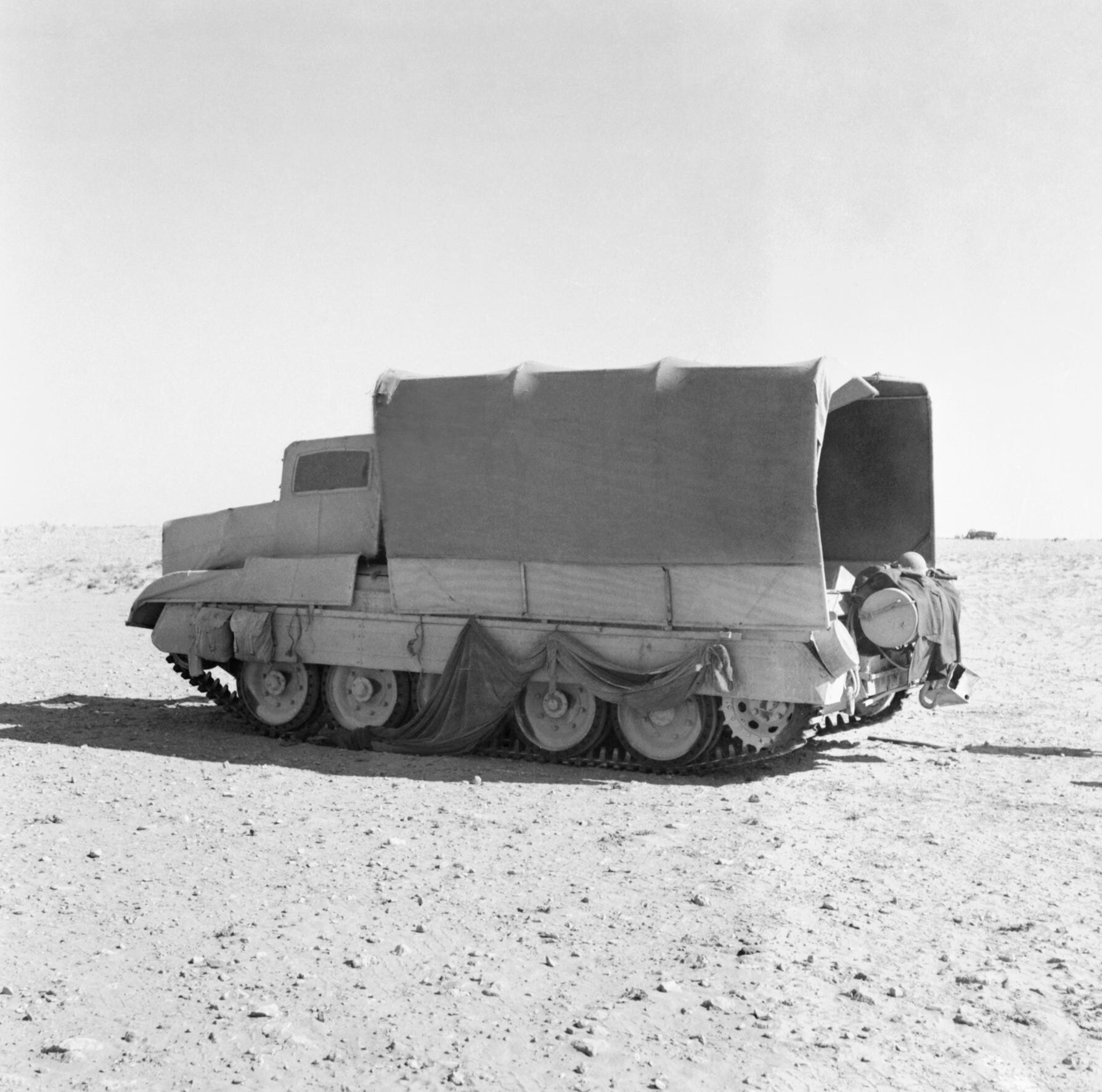
A Crusader tank with its "Sunshield" lorry camouflage erected, 26 October 1942.

While organized as 24th Armoured Brigade Group, it also commanded:

From	To	Unit
12 October 1942	31 October 1942	5th Regiment, Royal Horse Artillery
12 October 1942	31 October 1942	"B" Battery, 73rd Anti-Tank Regiment, RA
12 October 1942	31 October 1942	116th Light Anti-Aircraft Battery, RA
30 August 1942	31 October 1942	1 Troop of 6th Field Squadron, RE
30 August 1942	14 December 1942	332nd Company, RASC
30 August 1942	14 December 1942	334th Company, RASC
30 August 1942	14 December 1942	6th Light Field Ambulance, RAMC

== Dummy tanks ==
74th Armoured Brigade (Dummy Tanks) 24th Armoured Brigade (Dummy Tanks) 87th Armoured Brigade (Dummy Tanks)
- Active: 5 July 1942 – 29 September 1944
- Country: United Kingdom
- Allegiance: British Crown
- Branch: British Army
- Type: Dummy tank
- Size: "Brigade"
- Part of: British Troops in Egypt; Ninth Army; Middle East Forces
- Engagements: Western Desert campaign

The brigade was reformed to control a number of dummy tank "regiments". These were intended to deceive the enemy as to the disposition and strength of British armour.

=== Reformed ===
On 5 July 1942, 'A' Force Depot was redesignated as 74th Armoured Brigade (Dummy Tanks) in Egypt under the command of Headquarters British Troops in Egypt. The "brigade" was redesignated a number of times: as 24th Armoured Brigade (Dummy Tanks) from 23 August 1943, as 87th Armoured Brigade (Dummy Tanks) from 26 May 1944, and back to 24th Armoured Brigade (Dummy Tanks) again from 14 July 1944. Finally, on 29 September 1944 it was redesignated and reorganized as 13th Reserve Unit in the UK.

=== Commander ===
74th / 24th / 87th Armoured Brigade (Dummy Tanks) was commanded throughout its existence by Lt-Col V.H. Jones (other than a brief period from 30 April to 30 June 1943 when Captain P.K. Copperthwaite was acting commander).

=== Dummy tank units ===
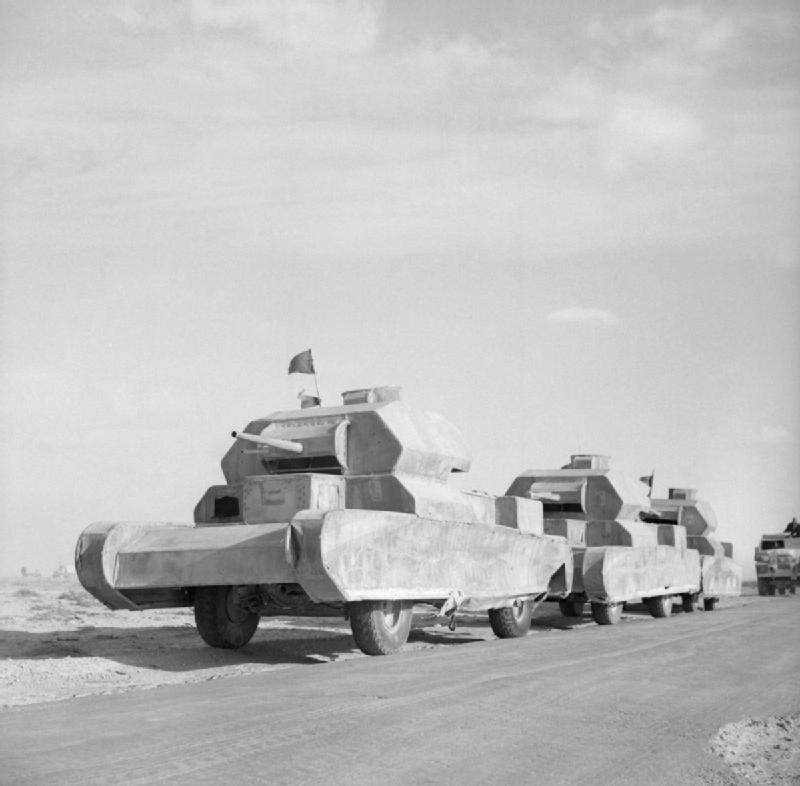
Dummy tanks, mounted on trucks, going to the forward areas in the Western Desert, 13 February 1942.

The brigade commanded the following units during its existence:

From	To	Unit
5 July 1942	26 August 1943	39th Royal Tank Regiment (DT)
5 July 1942	25 August 1943	101st Royal Tank Regiment (DT)
23 August 1943	25 August 1943	102nd Royal Tank Regiment (DT)
26 August 1943	25 May 1944	62nd Royal Tank Regiment (DT)
12 July 1944	17 September 1944	62nd Royal Tank Regiment (DT)
26 August 1943	12 February 1944	65th Royal Tank Regiment (DT)
15 February 1944	25 May 1944	60th Royal Tank Regiment (DT)
12 July 1944	17 September 1944	60th Royal Tank Regiment (DT)
26 May 1944	11 July 1944	3rd Royal Gloucestershire Hussars
26 May 1944	11 July 1944	4th Northamptonshire Yeomanry
14 July 1944	17 September 1944	'K' Detachment, Special Air Service Brigade

== See also ==
- British armoured formations of the Second World War
- List of British brigades of the Second World War
- Structure of the British Army in 1939

== Bibliography ==
- Bellis, Malcolm A. (1994). Regiments of the British Army 1939–1945 (Armour & Infantry). London: Military Press International. ISBN 0-85420-999-9.
- Joslen, H. F. (2003) [1960]. Orders of Battle: Second World War, 1939–1945. Uckfield, East Sussex: Naval and Military Press. ISBN 978-1-84342-474-1.
- Playfair, I.S.O.; and Molony, C.J.C.; with Flynn R.N., F.C. & Gleave, T.P. (2004) [1st. Pub. HMSO:1966]. Butler, J.R.M (ed.). The Mediterranean and Middle East, Volume IV: The Destruction of the Axis Forces in Africa. History of the Second World War United Kingdom Military Series. Uckfield: Naval & Military Press. ISBN 1-84574-068-8.
