= 1st Division (United Kingdom) =

1st Division (United Kingdom) may refer to:

- 1st Armoured Division (United Kingdom): now 1st (United Kingdom) Division. Mobile Division between 1937 and 1939. Disbanded in 1945, reformed from 6th Armoured Division 1946-47; 1st Armoured Division (1978–2014).
- 1st Infantry Division (United Kingdom): the Army traces this division's history back to 1809. Finally disbanded late 1970s.
- 1st Cavalry Division (United Kingdom): Previously known as the Cavalry Division and fought during the Napoleonic Wars, the Crimean War, the Second Boer War. During the Second World War, a new formation was raised, and subsequently became the 10th Armoured Division.
