= Michael Osborne Waddell =

Michael Osborne Waddell

Michael Osborne Waddell MC (22 December 1922 - 22 May 2015) was a British Army officer of the 50th Royal Tank Regiment who won an immediate Military Cross for his actions during the invasion of Sicily in 1943 when he saved the lives of eleven men after his column was hit by enemy fire. He studied agriculture at the University of Durham before joining the army and claimed that he only enrolled because he feared he would fail his exams. After the Second World War he returned to Durham where he studied medicine and spent the rest of his life as a general practitioner.
