= 40th/41st Royal Tank Regiment =

The 40th/41st Royal Tank Regiment (40/41 RTR) was an armoured regiment of the British Army in existence from 1956 until 1967.

It was formed in 1956, as part of the reorganisation of the Territorial Army (TA), from the 40th (The King's) Royal Tank Regiment and the 41st (Oldham) Royal Tank Regiment. Its primary role was to provide trained tank crewmen for the British Army of the Rhine in the event of hostilities between NATO and the Warsaw Pact. In 1964 a party of the Regiment's Ever Ready Reservists served with the 4th Royal Tank Regiment during the Aden Emergency.

In 1967, it was amalgamated with the Duke of Lancaster's Own Yeomanry, and the Regimental Standard presented by HM The Queen in 1960 was laid up in the town hall at Bootle, Liverpool, the former 40th RTR's principal recruiting area.
