= 8th Support Group =

- Active: 1940–1943
- Country: United Kingdom
- Branch: British Army
- Type: Support Group
- Role: Infantry, Artillery Formation
- Size: Brigade
- Part of: 8th Armoured Division

The 8th Support Group was a brigade-sized military formation of the British Army during the Second World War, attached to the 8th Armoured Division, composed of Regular Army units. The Support Group as part of 8th Armoured Division was sent to North Africa but never saw active service as a complete formation. As the division could not be provided with a lorried infantry brigade, it was broken up and was finally disbanded in Egypt on 1 January 1943.

Following the Second Battle of El Alamein a plan was put forth to use the remains of the division as a self-contained pursuit force to dart forward into the German–Italian rear as far as possibly Tobruk; however the plan to use the division was shelved and units in the forward area were used instead.

== Order of battle ==
The 8th Support Group was constituted as follows during the war:

- 73rd Anti-Tank Regiment, Royal Artillery (from 8 November 1940, left 12 July 1942)
- 14th Battalion, Sherwood Foresters (from 30 November 1940)
- 5th Regiment, Royal Horse Artillery (from 18 December 1940, left 17 July 1942)
- 56th Light Anti-Aircraft Regiment, Royal Artillery (from 21 January 1941, left 22 July 1942)

== Commanders ==
- Brigadier H.M. Stanford (from 11 November 1940)

== See also ==
- List of British brigades of the Second World War
