= 47th (Oldham) Royal Tank Regiment =

The 47th (Oldham) Royal Tank Regiment (47 RTR) was an armoured regiment of the British Army during the Second World War. It was part of the Royal Tank Regiment, itself part of the Royal Armoured Corps.

It was formed as a duplicate of the 41st (Oldham) Royal Tank Regiment, a newly mobilised Territorial Army unit.
