= Caldari =

Coordinates: 42°18′N 14°23′E

- Frazione
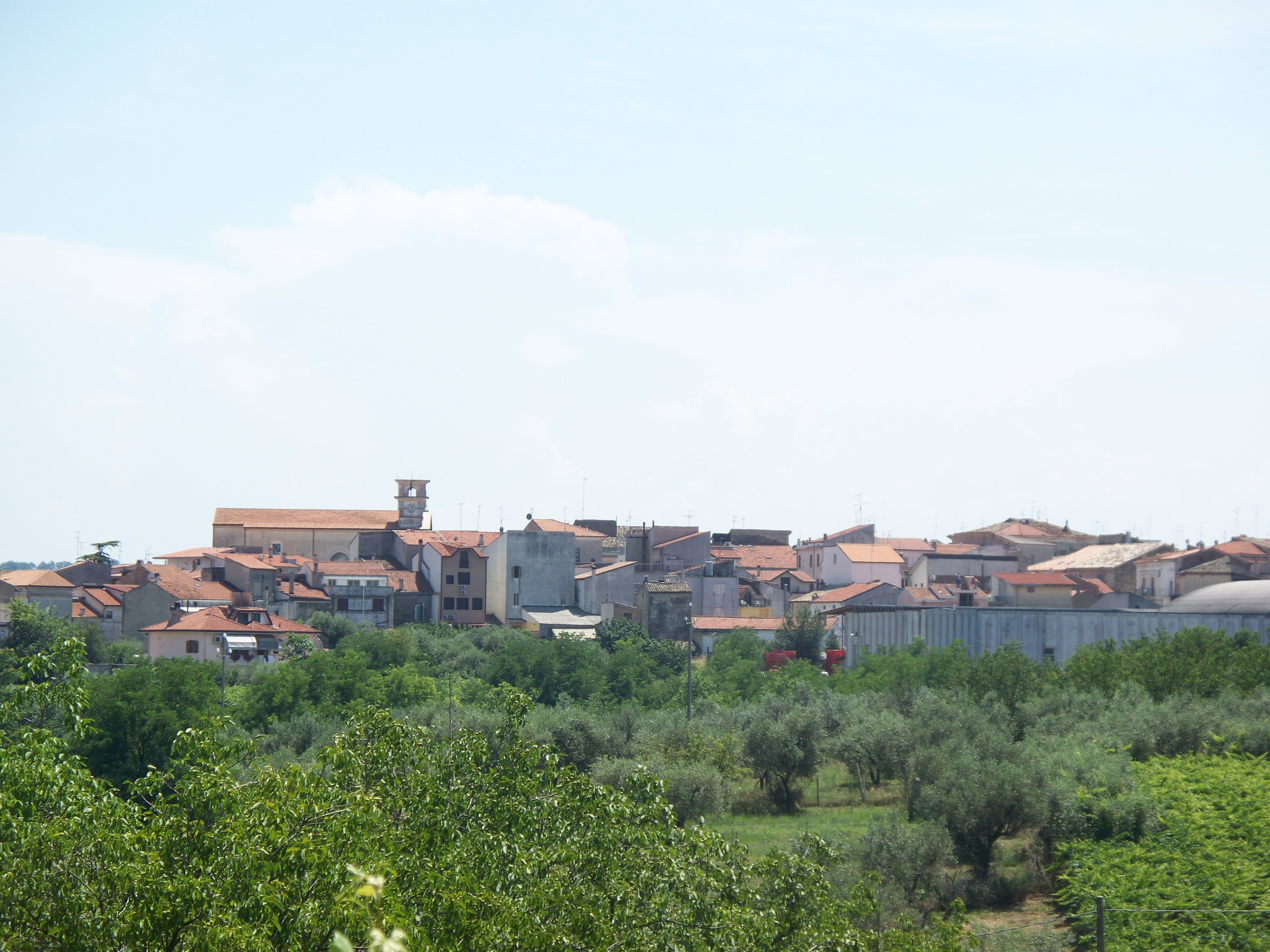
- Panorama caldari
- Interactive map of Caldari
- Country: Italy
- Region: Abruzzo
- Province: Chieti
- Time zone: UTC+1 (CET)
  - Summer (DST): UTC+2 (CEST)

Caldari is a frazione of the municipality of Ortona in the Province of Chieti in Abruzzo, Italy.

Some families that originate from Caldari include the DiIenno, Dragani, Tenaglia, Petrangelo, D'Annible, Gaeta, Mennicucci, Di Ienno, Di Nunzio, Natale, Vedilei, Cieri, and Nasuti families.
