= Queen's Westminsters =

Unit of the British Army

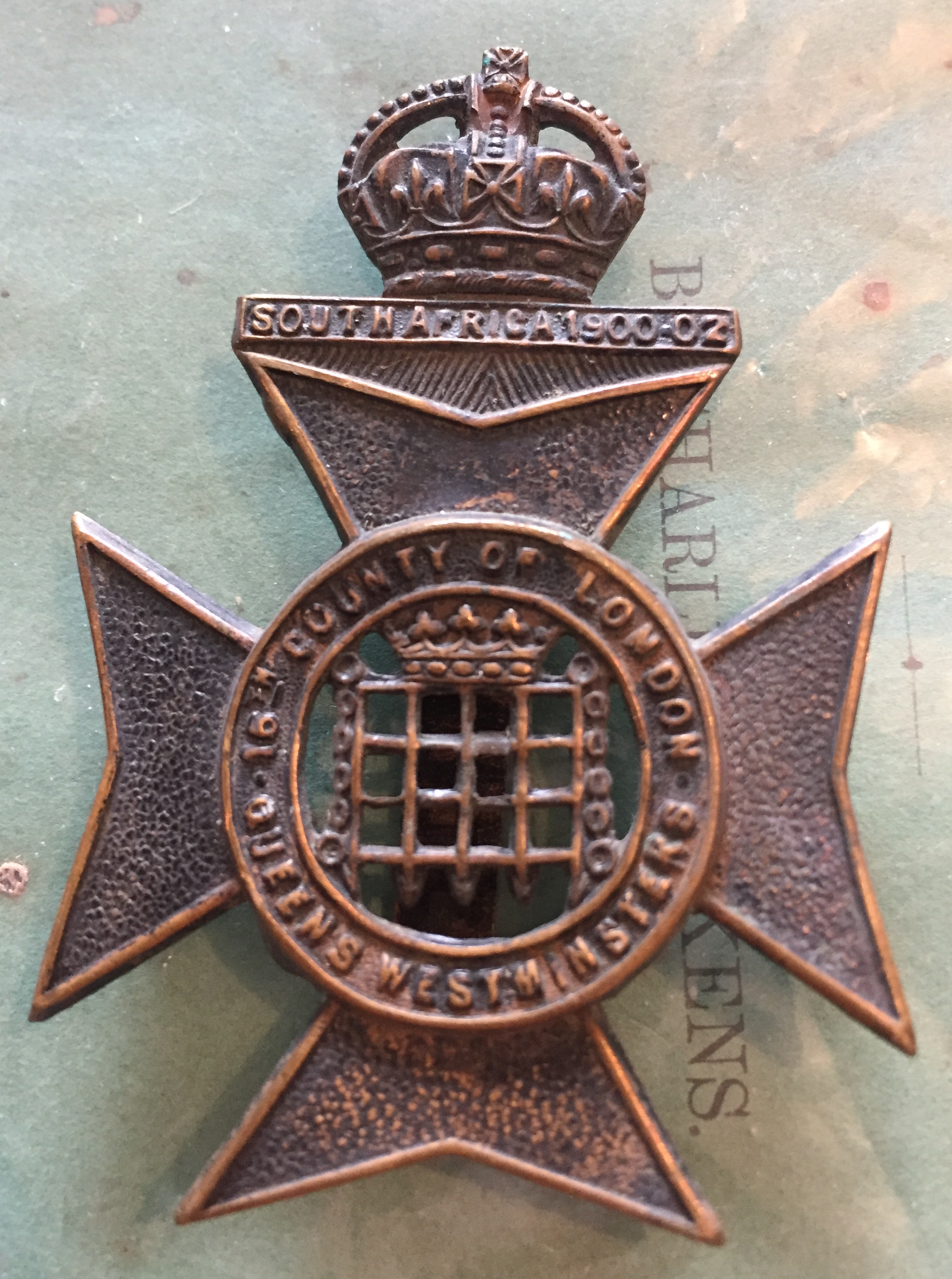
- Cap Badge.
- Active: 1860–1961
- Country: United Kingdom
- Branch: Army Reserve
- Type: Infantry
- Role: Infantry
- Part of: London Regiment
- Garrison/HQ: 58 Buckingham Gate (1886–1961)

Commanders
- Honorary Colonels: Hugh Grosvenor, 1st Duke of Westminster (1881); Field Marshal HM King Edward VII (1921); Sir Edward Geoffrey Hippisley-Cox CBE TD DL (1939); Major Robert Anthony Eden, 1st Earl of Avon and Viscount Eden of Royal Leamington Spa KG MC (1952)

The Queen's Westminsters were an infantry regiment of the Territorial Army, part of the British Army. Originally formed from Rifle Volunteer Corps, which were established after a French invasion scare of 1859. The unit became part of the newly established London Regiment on the formation of the Territorial Force in 1908. It was subsequently amalgamated in 1921 with the Civil Service Rifles, and became a territorial Battalion of the King's Royal Rifle Corps in 1937. It ceased to exist as separate entity after it was amalgamated in 1961.

== History ==
=== Rifle Volunteers ===
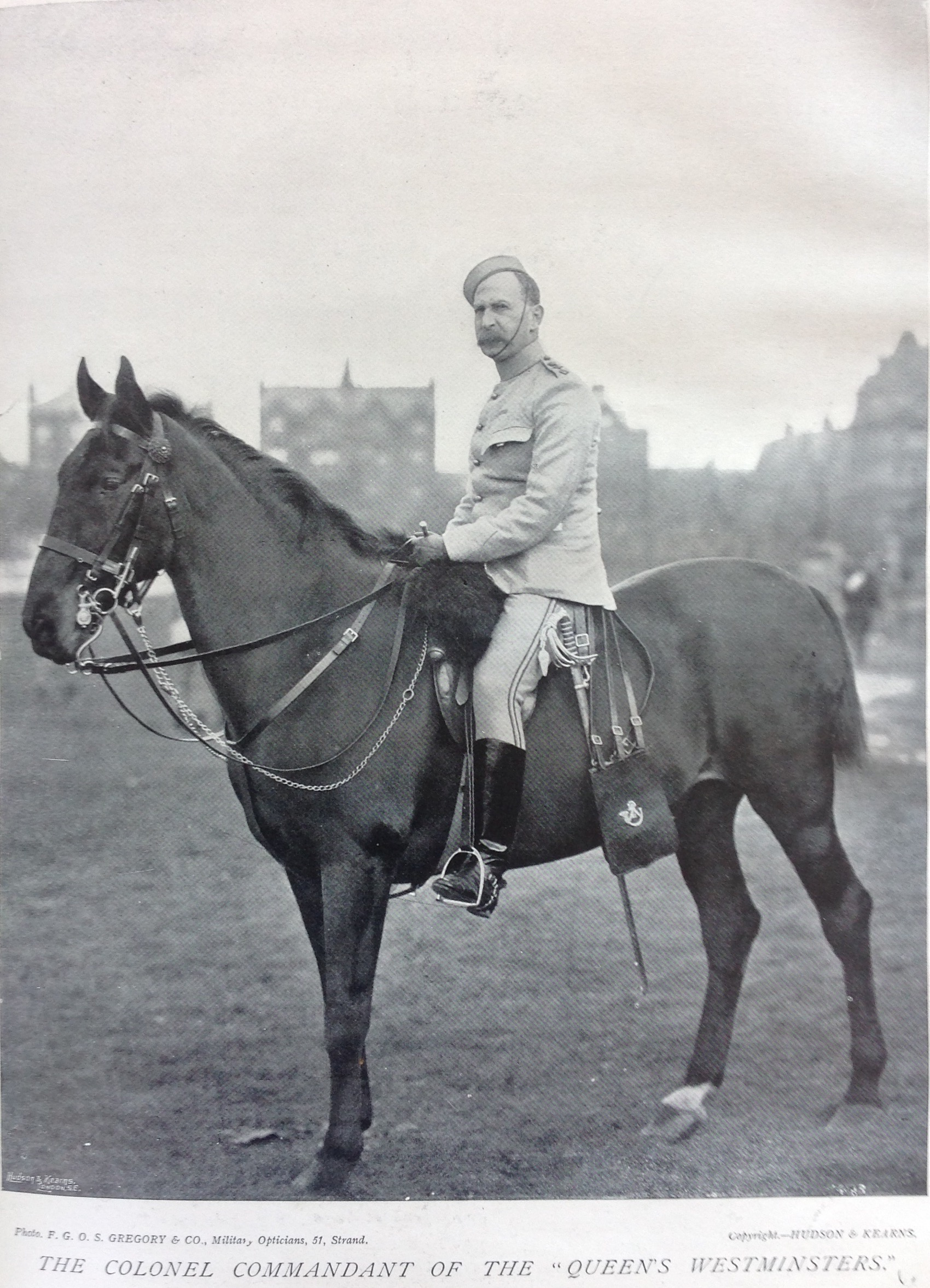
Sir Charles Howard Vincent, Commanding Officer of the Queen's Westminster Rifle Volunteers, 1884–1904. Pictured in 1896

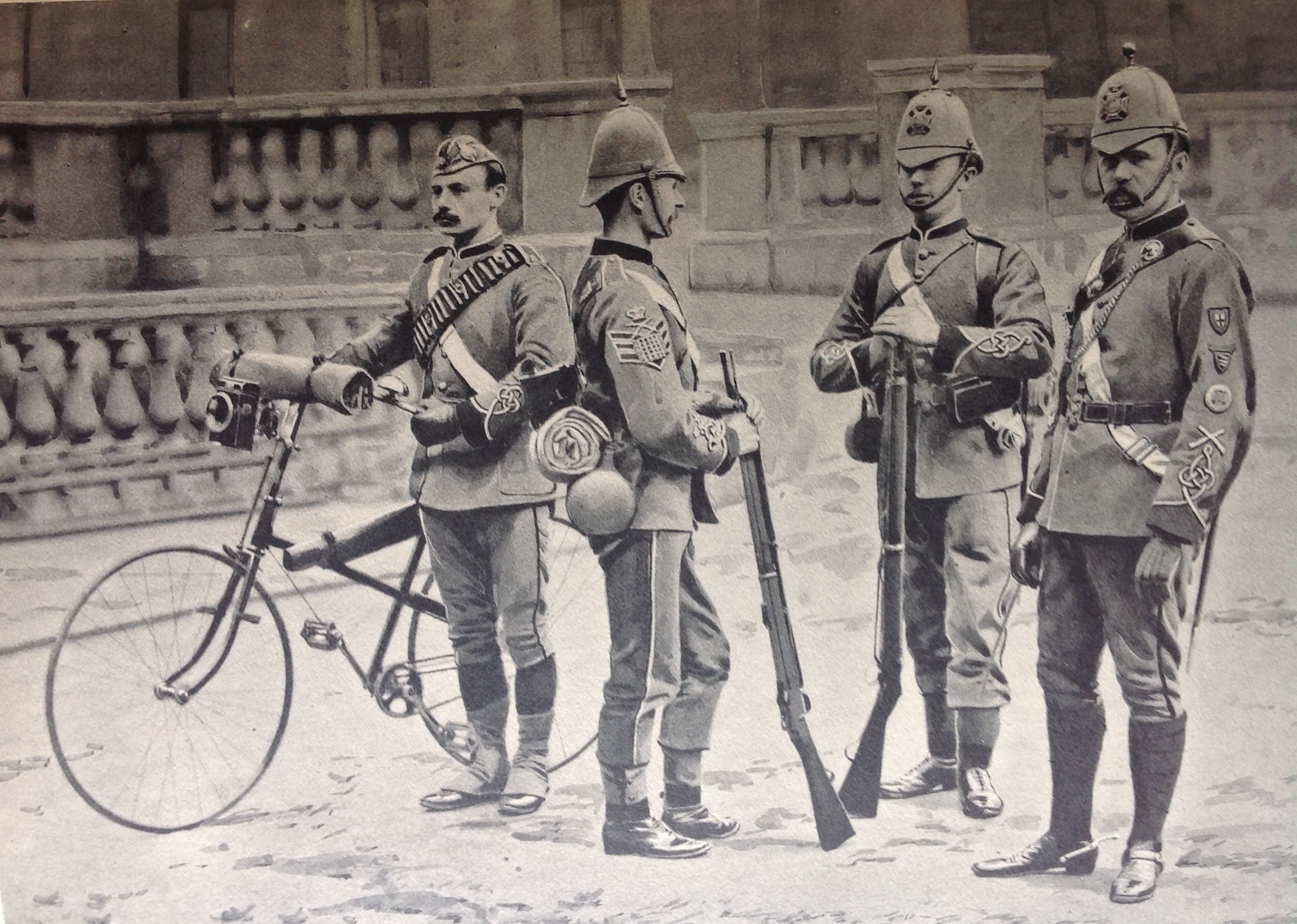
Group of the 13th Middlesex Rifle Volunteers (Queen's Westminsters), c1895

The regiment was founded on the formation of the Volunteer Force, raised by the Duke of Westminster and named in honour of Queen Victoria in 1860. Initially it was known as the Pimlico Rifle Volunteer Corps. A year later it amalgamated with the Westminster Rifle Volunteers and became known as the Queen's Westminsters.

In 1880 most London volunteer units were re-numbered. As a result, the unit became the 13th Middlesex (Queen's Westminster) Volunteer Rifle Corps and were attached to the King's Royal Rifle Corps as a Volunteer Battalion. In 1886 the battalion established its headquarters at 58 Buckingham Gate, Westminster. and by 1902 it was the largest volunteer rifle corps battalion in London.

=== First World War ===
Under the Haldane Reforms that created the Territorial Force in 1908, the battalion was included in the new all-Territorial London Regiment, taking its place as the 16th (County of London) Battalion, The London Regiment (Queen's Westminsters).

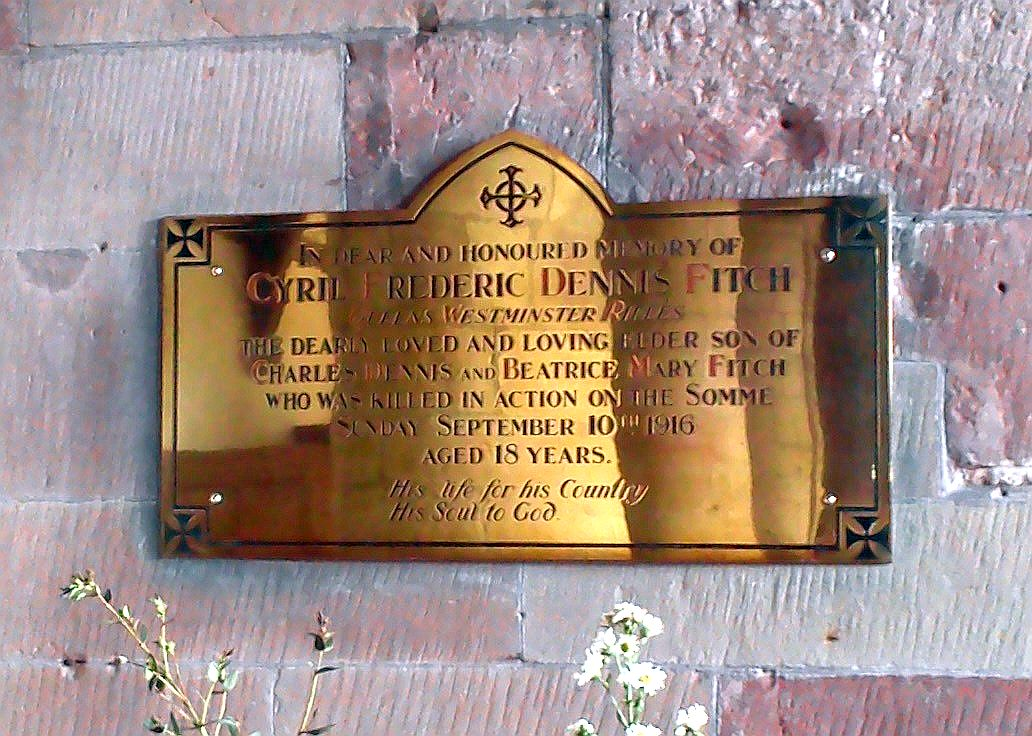
Memorial in St Cassian's Church in Chaddesley Corbett, Worcestershire, to C. F. D. Fitch of the Queen's Westminster Rifles, killed in the Battle of the Somme in 1916

On the outbreak of the First World War the battalion was designated 1/16th (County of London) Battalion (Queen's Westminster Rifles). At this stage it was part of 4th London Brigade, part of the 2nd London Division. On mobilisation it moved to the Hemel Hempstead area. On 3 November 1914 it left the Division and landed at Le Havre. On 12 November 1914 it came under command of 18th Brigade in the 6th Division.

During the war the unit raised a 2nd and 3rd Battalion.The battalions were also redesignated, becoming, for example, '1/16th' Londons (for the 1st Line) to differentiate them from the 2nd Line units, which were redesignated '2/16th' Londons (for the 2nd Line).

On 10 February 1916 the 1st battalion transferred to 169th (3rd London) Brigade in 56th (London) Division. The 2/16th served as part of 179th (2/4th London) Brigade in the Middle East.

=== Interwar ===
On 31 December 1921 the battalion amalgamated with the 15th (County of London) Battalion, The London Regiment (Prince of Wales's Own, Civil Service Rifles) to form the 16th (County of London) Battalion, The London Regiment (Queen's Westminster and Civil Service Rifles). It evolved to become the 16th London Regiment (Queen's Westminster and Civil Service Rifles) in 1922. Then, on the break-up of the London Regiment in 1937, it became the Queen's Westminsters, The King's Royal Rifle Corps.

=== Second World War ===
The original Westminsters became the 1st Battalion after a duplicate battalion was raised in 1939. The following year, it was converted to a motor battalion. In 1941, the 1st Battalion was re-titled as the 11th (Queen's Westminsters) Battalion, King's Royal Rifle Corps, and the 2nd, the 12th (Queen's Westminsters) Battalion, King's Royal Rifle Corps.

Both units saw extensive service during the war. The 11th Westminsters, as part of the 24th Armoured Brigade, saw service in the North African Campaign in mid-1942, taking part in the Allied offensive during the Second Battle of El Alamein against Erwin Rommel's Afrika Korps. The battalion took part in the subsequent advance after the Germans and Italians went into full-retreat in North Africa, seeing action in the Tunisia Campaign as part of the 23rd Armoured Brigade after the 24th Armoured Brigade was disbanded.

The 11th Westminsters moved to Sicily the following year, taking part in the campaign on the Italian island, which began on 10 July 1943. It later moved to the Italian Front, remaining there into 1944. In December 1944, the Westminsters took part in the operations to quell a Communist uprising in the Greek capital of Athens; this mission was successful and a cease-fire was signed on 11 January 1945.

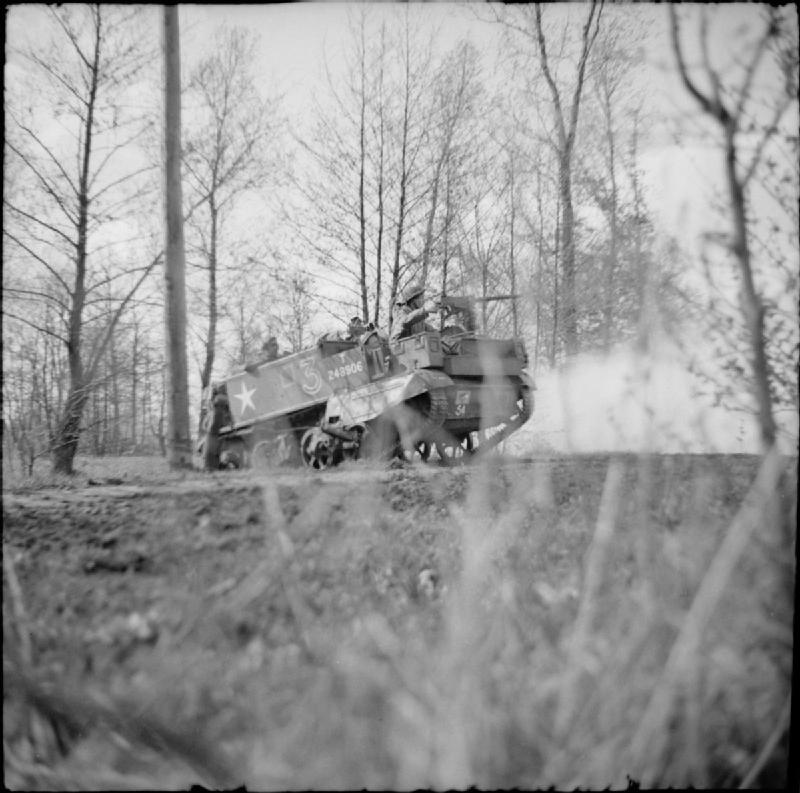
Universal Carrier of the 12th (Queen's Westminsters) Battalion, King's Royal Rifle Corps with Browning machine gun in action against a German MG position, the Netherlands, 2 April 1945.

The 12th Westminsters, having remained in the United Kingdom since the war began, took part in the Battle of Normandy in 1944, forming part of the 8th Armoured Brigade. It saw extensive service in France, including action at Rauray on 26 June and at Mont Pincon in Operation Epsom and during the advance east to the Seine, which was crossed in late August. The battalion subsequently crossed the Somme river, a scene of carnage during the Great War, which the Westminsters predecessors had experienced. It later took part in the liberation of Lille in early September, experiencing a welcoming reception by the inhabitants of the large town. Shortly afterwards, the 12th took part in the advance into Belgium, taking part in, among others, the capture of Oostham. The 12th Westminsters saw further service in the Netherlands and when Victory in Europe Day came on 8 May, were in Germany itself.

Notable soldiers in the Westminsters during World War II include the journalist Bill Deedes, who served in the North West Europe Campaign and was awarded the Military Cross, and Lord Killanin, later the President of the International Olympic Committee.

=== Post-War ===
Shortly after the war, the Territorial Army was reconstituted and the 11th and 12th amalgamated to form, simply, The Queen's Westminsters. On 1 May 1961, it was amalgamated with the Queen Victoria's Rifles to form the Queen's Royal Rifles.

== Battle honours ==
The regiment's battle honours were as follows:

- The Great War
  - Hill 60, Ypres 1915, '17, Gravenstafel, St Julien, Frezenberg, Bellewaarde, Somme 1916, '18, Albert 1916, '18, Guillemont, Ginchy, Flers Courcelette, Morval, Le Transloy, Arras 1917, Scarpe 1917, Langemarck 1917, Menin Road, Polygon Wood, Passchendaele, Cambrai 1917, Bapaume 1918, Villers Bretonneux, Amiens, Hindenburg Line, Épéhy, Pursuit to Mons, France and Flanders 1914-18
- Second World War:
  - North-West Europe: Mont Pincon, Roer, Rhineland, Kleve, Goch, Rhine, North-West Europe 1944-45
  - North Africa: El Alamein, North Africa 1942
  - Italy: Italy 1943-44
  - Other: Athens, Greece 1944-45

== Memorials ==
As of 2014 the memorial to its dead in the World Wars was located in the Drill Hall at the Army Reserve Centre in Fulham House.

== Sources ==
- Joslen, Lt-Col H.F. (2003). Orders of Battle, United Kingdom and Colonial Formations and Units in the Second World War, 1939–1945. Uckfield: Naval & Military. ISBN 1-84342-474-6.
