= 41st (Oldham) Royal Tank Regiment =

The 41st (Oldham) Royal Tank Regiment (41 RTR) was an armoured regiment of the British Army from 1938 until 1956. It was part of the Royal Tank Regiment, itself part of the Royal Armoured Corps.

It was originally formed before World War II by the conversion of the 10th Battalion, Manchester Regiment, a Territorial Army infantry battalion, to a tank unit. As part of the 24th Armoured Brigade, it took part in the Second Battle of El Alamein, but then shared the fate of the rest of its brigade, being dispersed to provide replacements for other units. In 1947, the Regiment was re-formed. They were among the troops inspected by Elizabeth II during her visit in 1954. In 1956, it amalgamated with the 40th (The King's) Royal Tank Regiment to form the 40th/41st Royal Tank Regiment.
