= 50th Royal Tank Regiment =

WW2 armoured regiment of the British Army

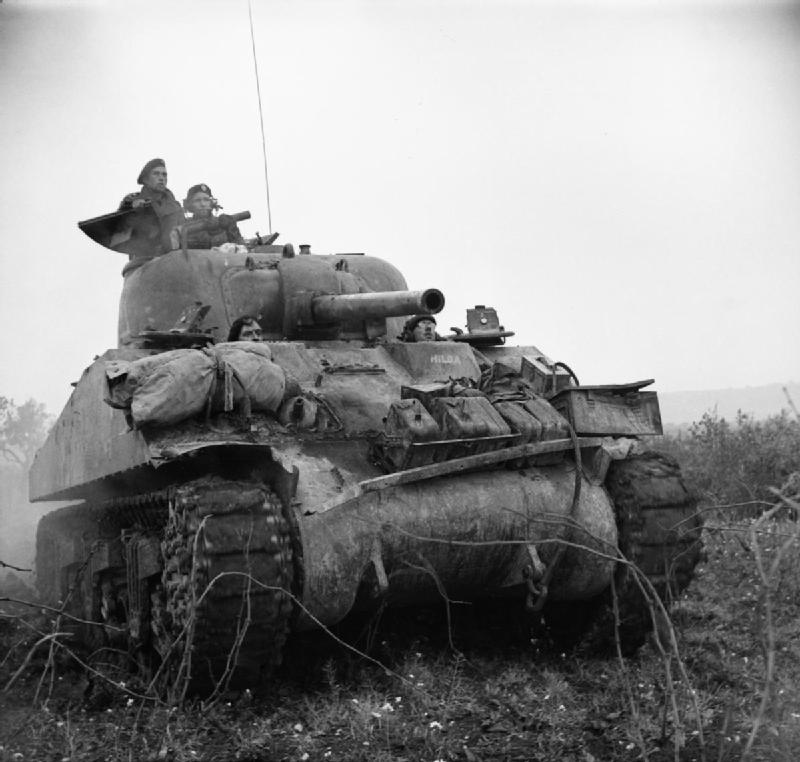
A Sherman tank of 50th Royal Tank Regiment near Caldari, Italy, 17 December 1943

The 50th Royal Tank Regiment (50 RTR) was an armoured regiment of the British Army during the Second World War. It was part of the Royal Tank Regiment, itself part of the Royal Armoured Corps. It was formed in June 1939 as a duplicate of the 44th Royal Tank Regiment, a Territorial Army unit itself newly converted from 6th Battalion, Gloucestershire Regiment. The Commanding Officer was H M Brown; the second in command F C Gibaud; the adjutant A F G Mathers, the RSM T G Beardmore MM and the company commanders were R Hazzledene (A); E C K Weston (B) and O F Curtoys (C).

== See also ==
- Michael Osborne Waddell Winner of the Military Cross while serving with the regiment.
