= 40th (The King's) Royal Tank Regiment =

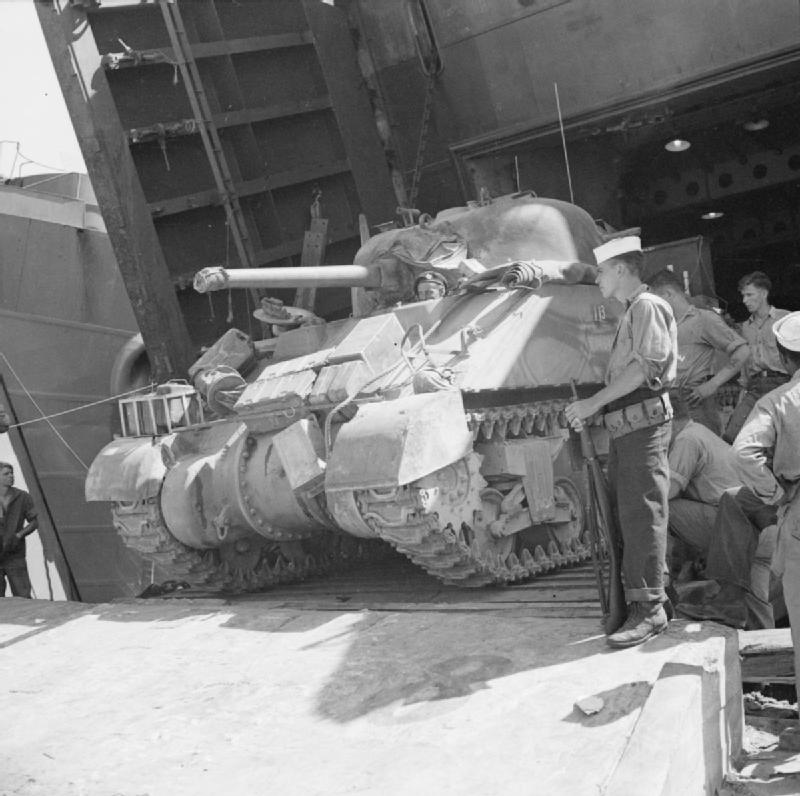
A Sherman tank of 40th Royal Tank Regiment reversing into a landing ship at Bizerta, Tunisia, September 1943

The 40th (The King's) Royal Tank Regiment (40 RTR) was an armoured regiment of the British Army from 1938 until 1956. It was part of the Royal Tank Regiment, itself part of the Royal Armoured Corps.

It was originally formed by converting the 7th Battalion, King's Regiment (Liverpool), a Territorial Army infantry battalion that recruited mainly in the Bootle area, to a tank unit.

Equipped with Vickers Valentine tanks, the regiment served with the 23rd Armoured Brigade in North Africa. Under the command of Lieutenant Colonel J.L. Finigan, it fought at El Alamein and acquired the nickname "Monty's Foxhounds" during the long pursuit of the Afrika Korps and the Italian Army across Egypt and Libya and into Tunisia.

It later served in the Italian Campaign, landing in Sicily in July 1943, and fighting its way up the eastern coast. It was the first RTR regiment to arrive in Italy. It then fought their way up the country to the Gothic and Gustaf lines and to the Po valley. It then fought in Greece during the Greek Civil War.

The Regiment was placed in suspended animation in mid-1946, and then reconstituted at Liverpool as an armoured regiment of the Territorial Army in 1947. In recognition of its services in North Africa, Vickers Engineering presented Colonel Finigan with a silver model of the Valentine, which still serves as a centrepiece when former officers of the Regiment and its successor dine formally together. In 1956, the Regiment was amalgamated with the 41st (Oldham) Royal Tank Regiment to form the 40th/41st Royal Tank Regiment.
