= 56th (London) Infantry Division =

1st London Division 56th (1st London) Division 1st London Infantry Division 56th (London) Infantry Division 56th (London) Armoured Division
- The Shoulder patch of the 56th (1st London) Division, First World War.
- Active: 1908–1919; 1920–1946; 1947–1961
- Country: United Kingdom
- Branch: Territorial Army
- Type: Infantry; Armoured warfare
- Size: Division
- Garrison/HQ: New Broad Street (1914); Finsbury Barracks (1939)
- Nickname: "The Black Cats"
- Engagements: First World War; Second World War

Commanders
- Notable commanders: Sir Charles Amyatt Hull; Sir Claude Liardet; Sir Montagu Stopford; Douglas Graham; Sir Gerald Templer; Sir Harold Pyman

Insignia
- Identification symbol: The formation badge for the 56th Division during the Second World War featured Dick Whittington's black cat on a red background.

The 56th (London) Infantry Division was a Territorial Army infantry division of the British Army, which served under several different titles and designations. The division served in the trenches of the Western Front during the First World War. Demobilised after the war, the division was reformed in 1920 and saw active service again in the Second World War in Tunisia and Italy. The division was again disbanded in 1946 and reformed first as an armoured formation and then as an infantry division before final disbandment in 1961.

== Formation ==
The Territorial Force (TF) was formed on 1 April 1908 following the enactment of the Territorial and Reserve Forces Act 1907 (7 Edw.7, c.9) which combined and re-organised the old Volunteer Force, the Honourable Artillery Company and the Yeomanry. On formation, the TF contained 14 infantry divisions and 14 mounted yeomanry brigades. One of the divisions was the 1st London Division. It was a wholly new formation, although its three infantry brigade headquarters (HQs) had previously existed in the Volunteers, as had most of its constituent units. The division comprised the first 12 battalions of the all-TF London Regiment, the first four London brigades of the Royal Field Artillery and the former Tower Hamlets Engineers; most of the supporting arms were newly raised. Essentially, all these units were based in inner London, while the 2nd London Division consisted of TF units recruited from suburban London. 1st London Division's HQ was at Friar's House in New Broad Street in the City of London.

== First World War ==
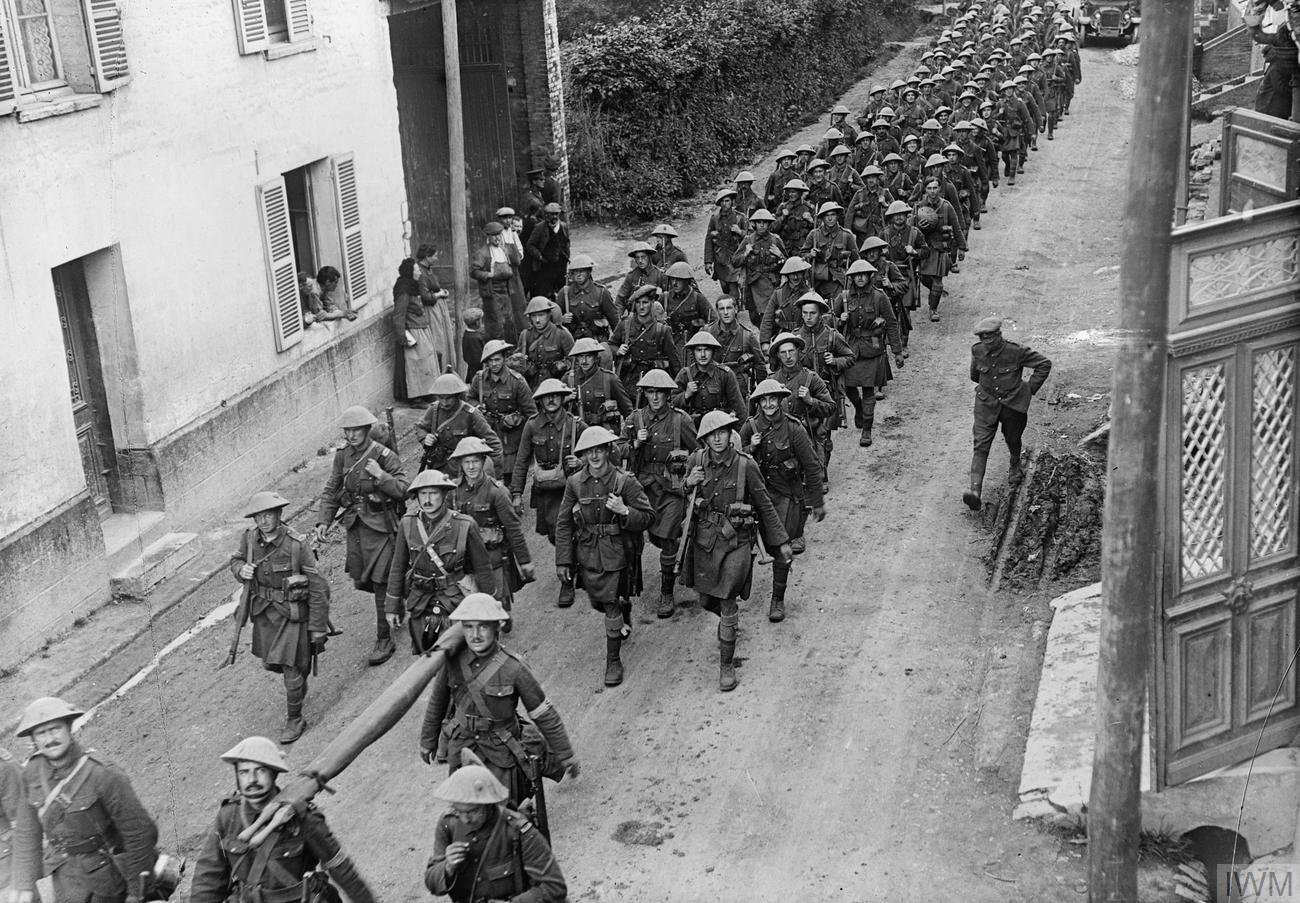
A Company, 1/14th Battalion, London Regiment (London Scottish) marching to the trenches on the Doullens-Amiens road at Pas-en-Artois, 26 June 1916.

On the outbreak of war in August 1914 the division's units had just left for their annual training camps, the 1st and 3rd London brigades around Wool, Dorset, and the 2nd at Eastbourne, Sussex. They immediately returned to their drill halls to mobilise, and then proceeded to their initial war stations guarding railways in Southern England. The TF was now invited to volunteer for Overseas Service, and most units did so; those men who had signed up for Home Service only, together with the floods of volunteers enlisting, were formed into reserve or 2nd Line units and formations with a '2/' prefix, while the parent unit took a '1/' prefix. 1/1st London Division immediately began supplying reinforcements to the Regular Army overseas. On 1 September the whole of 1/1st London Brigade, with its associated signal and medical units, set off to relieve the regular garrison of Malta; individual battalions joined the British Expeditionary Force (BEF) on the Western Front. By early January 1915 the 1st Line division had ceased to exist and its remaining units had been attached to its 2nd Line duplicate, the 2/1st London Division.

On 7 January 1916 the Army Council authorised the re-formation in France of the division as 56th (1/1st London) Division. (Note: As a result, the 1st London Division received a higher number (56) than the 2nd London Division, which had already gone to France as a complete formation and received a lower number (47). This anomaly was maintained by their successor formations.) As many as possible of the original units or other London units were assembled and by 21 February the bulk of the division had concentrated around Hallencourt between Abbeville and Arras under the command of Major General C. P. Amyatt Hull, an experienced officer who had until recently commanded an infantry brigade. Although the division was effectively a new formation, its constituent units were now experienced in trench warfare. After shaking down it took its place in the line in the Hébuterne sector.

The 56th Division's first operation as a complete formation was the attack on the Gommecourt Salient on 1 July 1916, the first day on the Somme. Extensive (and obvious) preparations were made for this attack, which was a diversion from the main Somme Offensive. The leading battalions gained a lodgement in the German front line with comparatively light losses, but they came under heavy counter-attack and were cut off from reinforcements and ammunition resupply by an intense barrage laid down in no man's land by the German artillery. At nightfall the survivors made their way back to British lines, the division having lost over 4,300 casualties, mainly among the seven attacking battalions.

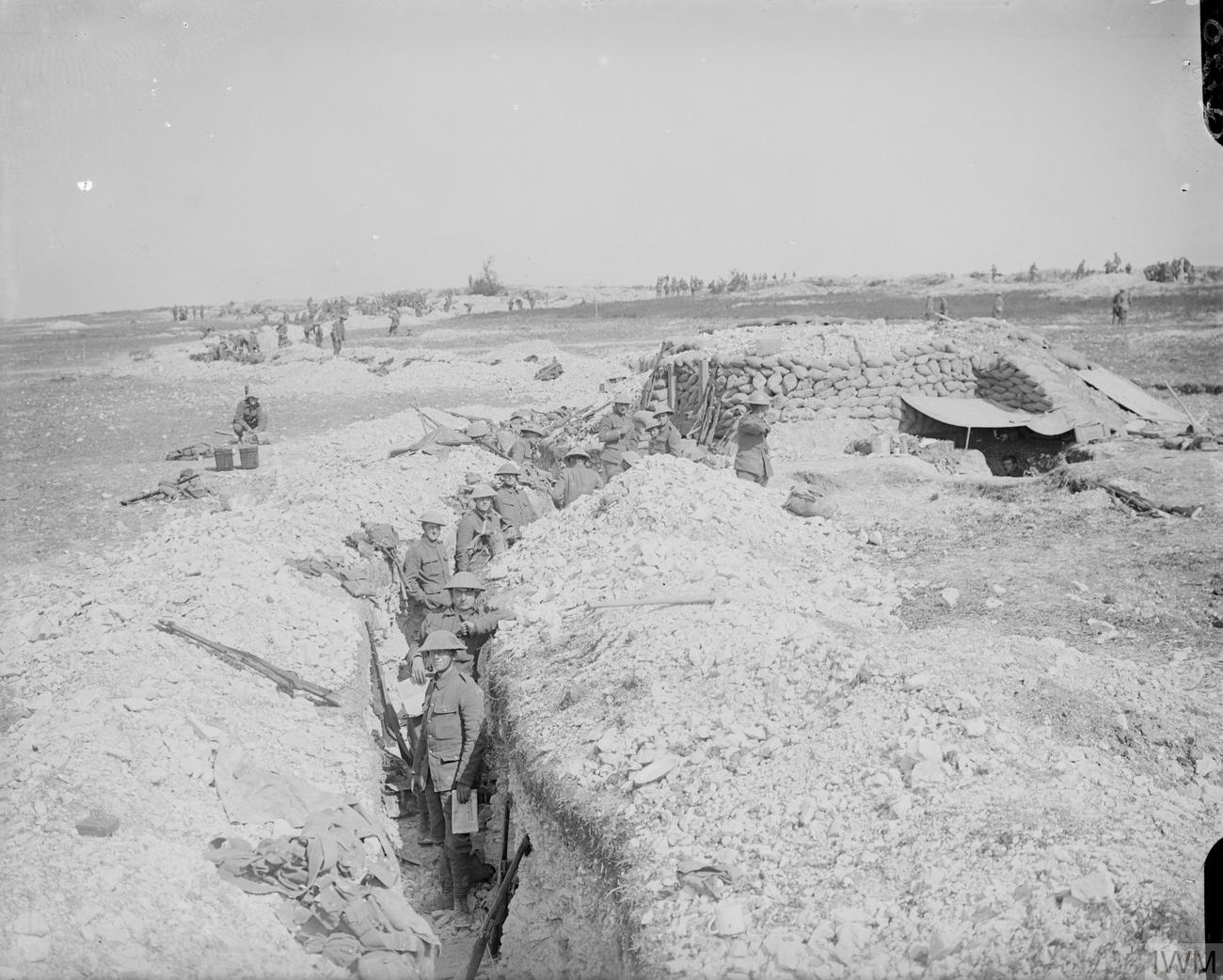
Troops of the 1/5th Battalion, London Regiment (London Rifle Brigade), in a reserve trench in Chimpanzee Valley between Hardecourt and Guillemont, 6 September 1916.

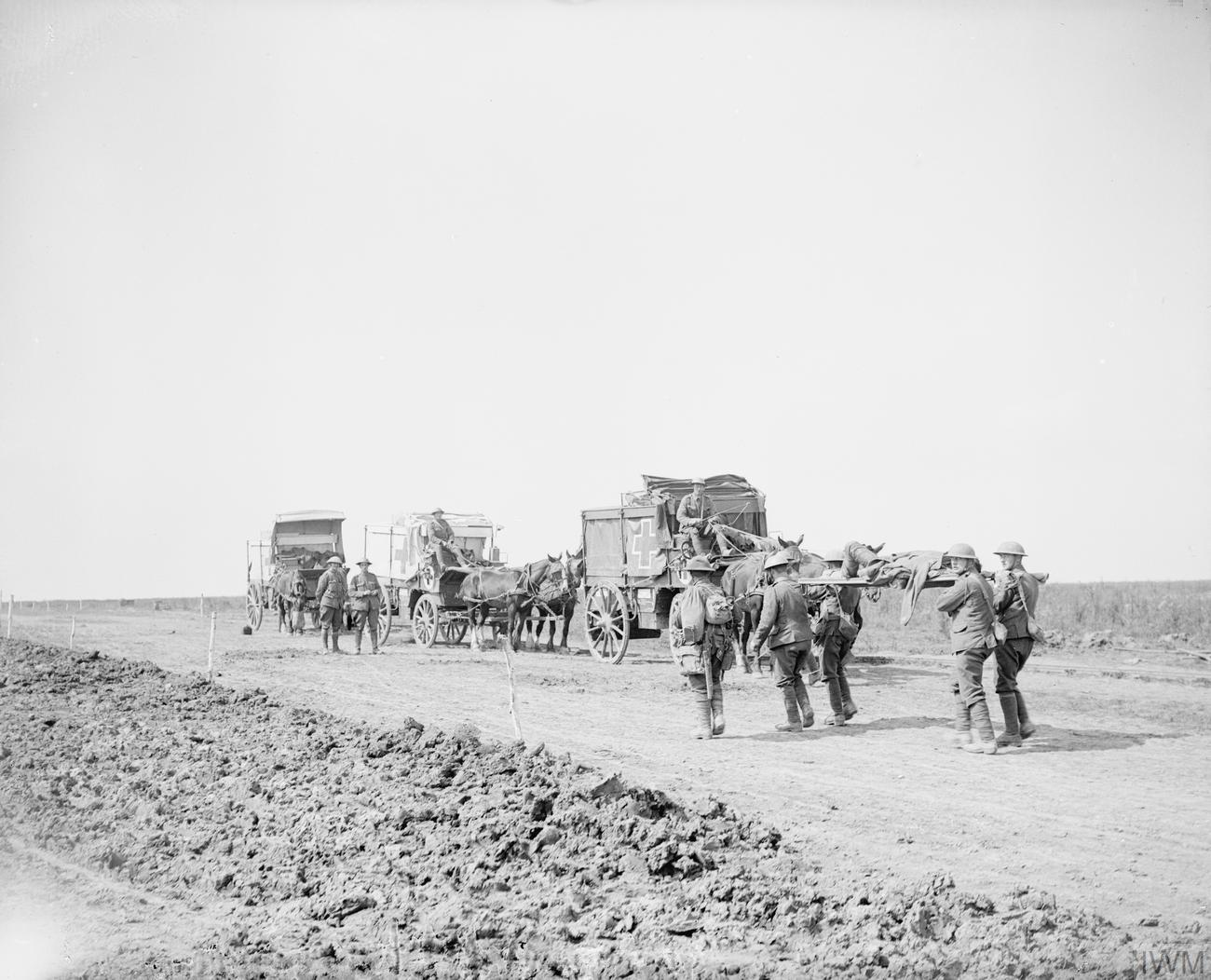
Horse ambulances of the 2/1st London Field Ambulance, Royal Army Medical Corps of the 56th Division on a track running east of Maricourt-Montauban Road, with wounded on stretchers just arriving, September 1916.

The 56th (1/1st London) Division served on the Western Front for the rest of the war, taking part in the following operations:

1916

- Battle of Ginchy (9 September)
- Battle of Flers–Courcelette (15–22 September)
- Battle of Morval (25–27 September)
- Capture of Combles (26 September)
- Battle of the Transloy Ridges (1–9 October)

1917

- German Retreat to the Hindenburg Line (14 March-5 April)
- Battle of Arras (9 April–4 May)
- Battle of Langemarck (16–17 August)
- Battle of Cambrai (21 November–2 December)

1918

- Battle of Arras (28 March)
- Battle of Albert (23 August)
- Battle of the Scarpe (26–30 August)
- Battle of the Canal du Nord (27 September–1 October)
- Battle of Cambrai (8–9 October)
- Pursuit to the Selle (9–12 October)
- Battle of the Sambre (4 November)
- Passage of the Grand Honnelle (5–7 November)

By midnight on 10 November the division was relieved in the front line and drawn back into corps support, but the divisional artillery remained in action until the Cease Fire sounded at 11.00 on 11 November when the armistice of 11 November 1918 came into force. During the 1010 days of its existence since re-formation, the 56th Division spent 100 days in active operations, 385 days in an active sector, 195 days in a quiet sector and 100 days at rest, although the divisional artillery was frequently left in the line after the withdrawal of the infantry of the division. Its total casualties were 1,470 officers and 33,339 other ranks, killed, wounded and missing.

After the armistice the division was engaged in road-mending etc. The first parties left for demobilisation in mid-December and the division gradually dwindled. Divisional headquarters left for England on 18 May 1919 and the final cadre followed on 10 June. The division began reforming in London District in April 1920.

== Interwar years ==
The division reformed as the 56th (1st London) Infantry Division in the renamed Territorial Army (TA) with much the same composition as before the First World War.

In 1935 the increasing need for anti-aircraft (AA) defence, particularly for London, was addressed by converting the 47th (2nd London) Division into the 1st Anti-Aircraft Division. A number of London infantry battalions and were also converted to the AA role. The remainder were concentrated in 56th (1st London) Division, which henceforth was simply designated The London Division, with its HQ at Finsbury Barracks. It was converted into a two-brigade motorised division in 1938 as 1st (London) Motor Division, under Major-General Claude Liardet, the first TA officer appointed to command a division. After the Munich Crisis the TA once again expanded by creating duplicate units, and the 2nd (London) Motor Division began to come ito existence in March 1939.

== Second World War ==
1st (London) Motor Division mobilised at the outbreak of the Second World War in September 1939. It was reorganised as an infantry division in June 1940 and renamed the 56th (London) Infantry Division on 18 November 1940. The divisional insignia during the Second World War was changed to an outline of a black cat in a red background. The cat stood for Dick Whittington's cat, a symbol of London.

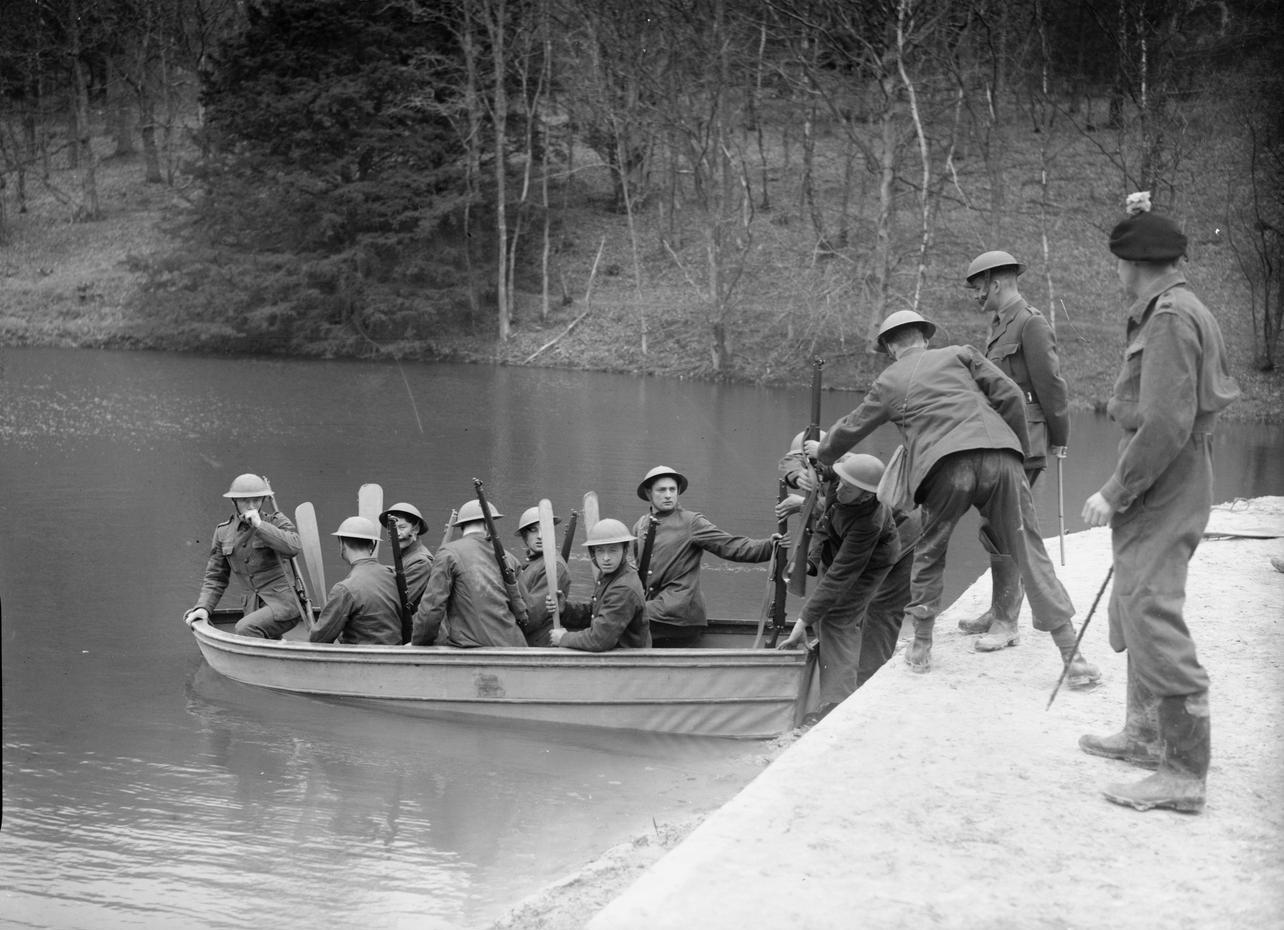
Men of the 1st Battalion, London Irish Rifles training in boat handling on a lake in Pippington Park, East Grinstead, April 1940.

The division remained in the United Kingdom during the Battle of France, moving to the Middle East in November 1942, where it served in Iraq and Palestine, until moving to Egypt in March 1943 and thence forward to Libya and the front, in April. This involved the division, commanded by Major-General Eric Miles, travelling some 2,300 miles (3,700 km) by road, a notable achievement and testament to the organization of the division and the ability of its mechanics and technicians. The division, minus the 168th Brigade, fought in the final stages of the Tunisian Campaign, where it suffered heavy casualties facing the German 90th Light Infantry Division, including its GOC, Major-General Miles, who had been in command since October 1941. He was replaced by Major-General Douglas Graham.

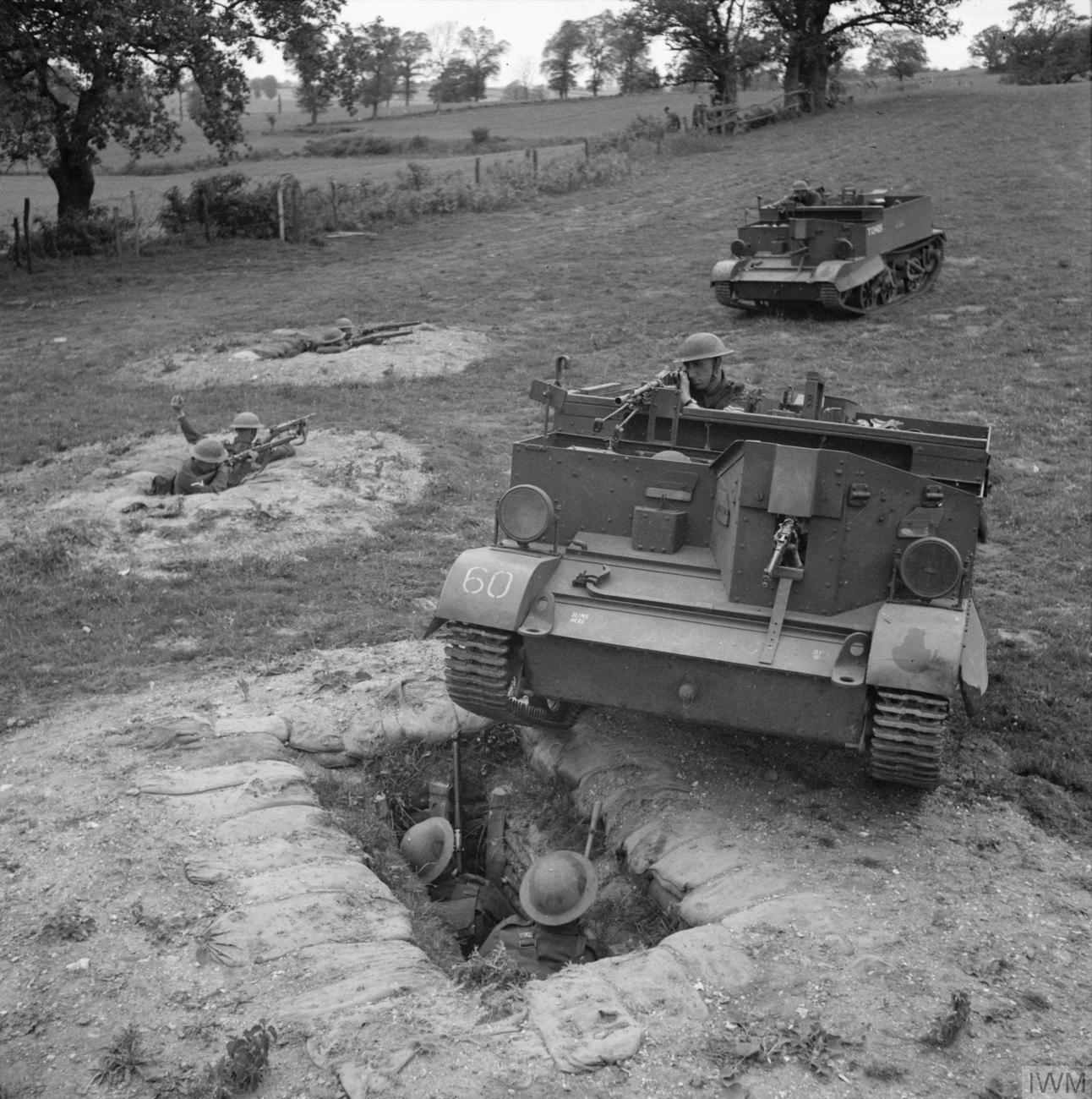
Universal carriers 'attack' men of the 10th Battalion, Royal Berkshire Regiment defending from slit trenches during training near Sudbury, Suffolk, 10 June 1942.

The division sat out the Allied invasion of Sicily and moved to Italy in September 1943, where they fought in the landings at Salerno under the command of the British X Corps. During this time the 201st Guards Brigade joined the division, to replace the 168th Brigade which returned to the division in October, although the 201st remained attached until January 1944. The 56th Division then crossed the Volturno Line in October and took part in the fighting around the Bernhardt Line. In January 1944, the 56th Division, now commanded by Major-General Gerald Templer, saw service in the Battle of Monte Cassino, serving there until February 1944 and participated in the Anzio campaign until relieved in March.

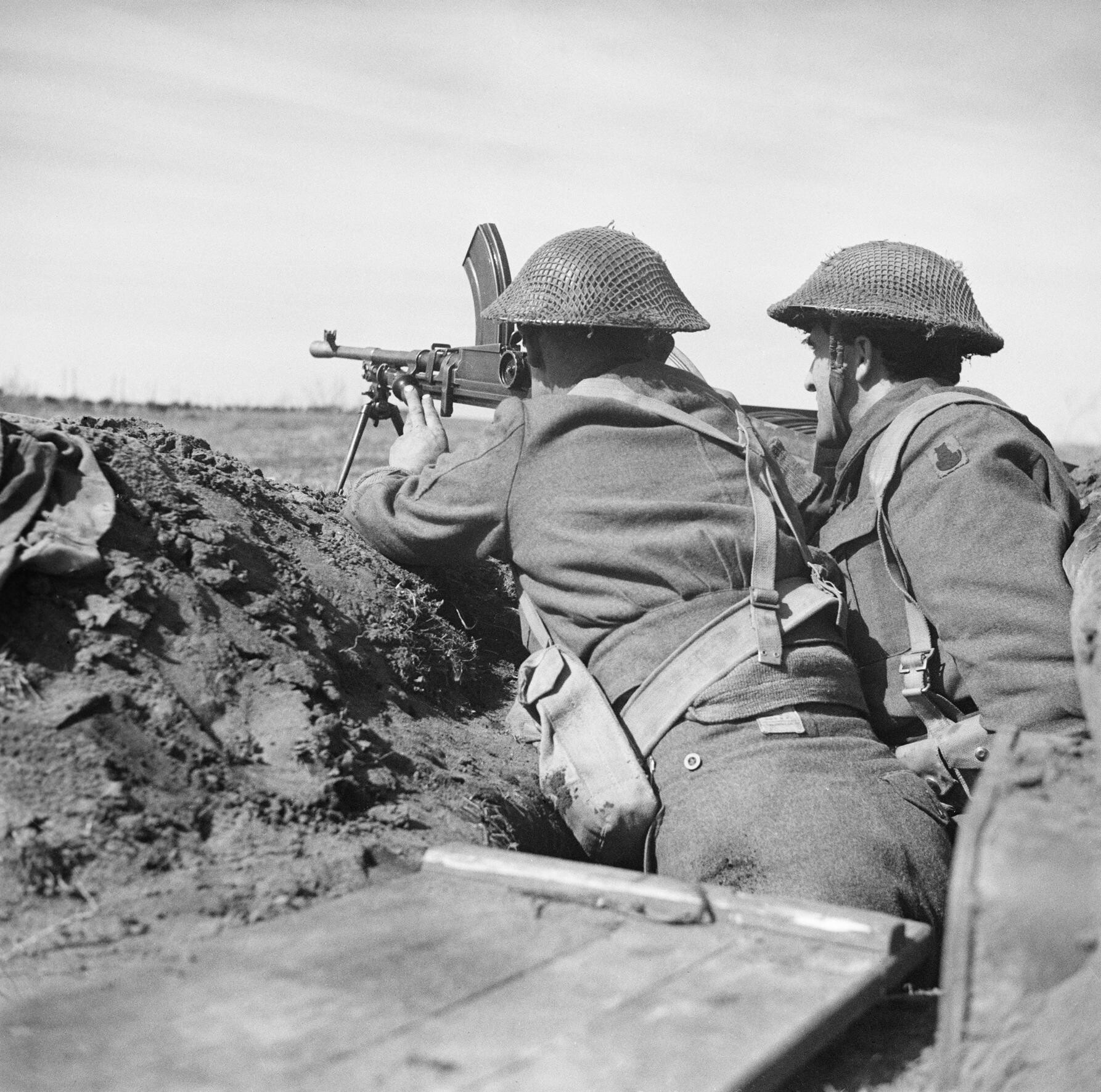
A British Bren gun crew of the 56th Division keep watch in a trench at Anzio, Italy, 1944.

After being withdrawn to Egypt at the end of March, the division, under Major-General John Whitfield, returned to Italy in July 1944, where it took part in the Battles along the Gothic Line and remained there until after Victory in Europe Day. During the fighting of 1944 and 1945, some of the infantry battalions that suffered heavy casualties were disbanded, to make up for an acute manpower shortage. The division also took part in Operation Grapeshot, the Allied offensive which ended the war in Italy.

After crossing the Volturno in October 1943, the division entered the town of Calvi Vecchia. Their attempts to radio the Fifth Army to cancel a planned bombing on the town failed. As a last resort, the 56th released an American homing pigeon, named G.I. Joe, which carried a message that reached the allies just as the planes were being warmed up. The attack was called off and the town was saved from the planned air assault.

== Postwar ==
56th (London) Armoured Divisional sign 1948–51.

56th (London) Divisional sign 1951–61.

In 1946, the 56th Division was demobilised then re-constituted in 1947 as the 56th (London) Armoured Division. On 20 December 1955, the Secretary of State for War informed the House of Commons that the armoured divisions and the 'mixed' division were to be converted to infantry. The 56th Division was one of the eight divisions placed on a lower establishment for home defence only. The territorial units of the Royal Armoured Corps were reduced to nine armoured regiments and eleven reconnaissance regiments by amalgamating pairs of regiments and the conversion of four RAC units to infantry.

On 20 July 1960, a further reduction of the T.A. was announced in the House of Commons. The Territorials were to be reduced from 266 fighting units to 195. The reductions were carried out in 1961, mainly by the amalgamation of units. On 1 May 1961, the T.A. divisional headquarters were merged with regular army districts and matched with Civil Defence Regions, to aid the mobilisation for war. The division ceased to exist as an independent entity and was linked to London District.

The 4th Battalion, Queen's Royal Surrey Regiment was formed in 1961, by the amalgamation of the 6th Battalion, East Surrey Regiment and the 23rd London Regiment, with a Battalion HQ and HQ Company at Kingston upon Thames. It formed part of 47th (London) Infantry Brigade (56th London Division/District). An echo of the 56th Division emerged again from 1987 to 1993, when the public duties battalions in the London District were grouped as the 56th Infantry Brigade.

== Insignia ==
During the First World War, 56th (1/1st London) Division wore as its formation sign the sword symbolising the martyrdom of Paul the Apostle from the coat of arms of the City of London. A new sign consisting of the red sword of St Paul on a khaki background was authorised in 1936 for the London Division in case of war, but it was never used.

During the Second World War, 56th (London) Division adopted a black silhouette of Dick Whittington's cat on a red ground as its formation sign, leading to its nickname of the 'Black Cats'.

From 1948 56th (London) Armoured Division wore a blue knight's helmet superimposed on the upright red sword, but in 1951 it resumed the black cat, now with the red sword superimposed.

== Victoria Cross recipients ==
- Corporal James McPhie, 416th (Edinburgh) Field Company, Royal Engineers, First World War
- Private George Mitchell, 1st Battalion, London Scottish, Second World War

== General officers commanding ==
The following officers commanded the division:

Appointed	General officer commanding (GOC)
March 1908 – December 1909	Major-General Alfred E. Codrington
December 1909 – February 1912	Major-General Arthur H. Henniker-Major
22 February 1912 – January 1915	Major-General William Fry
6 February 1916 – 20 July 1917	Major-General Charles P. A. Hull
20 July – 24 July 1917	Brigadier-General G. H. B. Freeth (acting)
24 July – August 1917	Major-General W. Douglas Smith
9 August – 10 August 1917	Brigadier-General G. H. B. Freeth (acting)
10 August 1917 – 25 April 1918	Major-General Frederick A. Dudgeon
25 April – 4 May 1918	Brigadier-General G. H. B. Freeth (acting)
4 May 1918 – June 1919	Major-General Sir Charles P. A. Hull
June 1919 – June 1923	Major-General Sir Cecil E. Pereira
June 1923 – June 1927	Major-General Sir Geoffrey P. T. Feilding
June 1927 – June 1931	Major-General Hubert Isacke
June 1931 – June 1934	Major-General Winston Dugan
June 1934 – June 1938	Major-General Percy R. C. Commings
June 1938 – January 1941	Major-General Claude F. Liardet
January–October 1941	Major-General Montagu G. N. Stopford
October 1941 – May 1943	Major-General Eric G. Miles
May–October 1943	Major-General Douglas A. H. Graham
October 1943 – July 1944	Major-General Gerald W. R. Templer
July 1944 – September 1946	Major-General John Y. Whitfield
September 1946 – September 1948	Major-General Gerald Lloyd-Verney
September 1948 – August 1949	Major-General Robert H. B. Arkwright
August 1949 – April 1951	Major-General Harold E. Pyman
April 1951 – March 1954	Major-General Richard W. Goodbody
March 1954 – April 1957	Major-General David Dawnay
April 1957 – March 1959	Major-General Robert N. H. C. Bray
March 1959 – 1960	Major-General Cecil M. F. Deakin

== Order of battle ==
1st London Division (1908–1915)

1st London Brigade (left 4 September 1914)

- 1st (City of London) Battalion, London Regiment (Royal Fusiliers)
- 2nd (City of London) Battalion, London Regiment (Royal Fusiliers)
- 3rd (City of London) Battalion, London Regiment (Royal Fusiliers)
- 4th (City of London) Battalion, London Regiment (Royal Fusiliers)

2nd London Brigade (broken up November 1914)

- 5th (City of London) Battalion, London Regiment (London Rifle Brigade)
- 6th (City of London) Battalion, London Regiment (City of London Rifles)
- 7th (City of London) Battalion, London Regiment
- 8th (City of London) Battalion, London Regiment (Post Office Rifles)

3rd London Brigade (broken up April 1915)

- 9th (County of London) Battalion, London Regiment (Queen Victoria's Rifles) (left 27 November 1914)
- 10th (County of London) Battalion, London Regiment (Paddington Rifles) (disbanded 1912)
- 10th (County of London) Battalion, London Regiment (Hackney) (raised 1912)
- 11th (County of London) Battalion, London Regiment (Finsbury Rifles)
- 12th (County of London) Battalion, London Regiment (The Rangers) (left 4 January 1915)

Mounted Troops

- 2nd County of London Yeomanry (Westminster Dragoons) (left 10 September 1914)

Divisional Royal Artillery (to 2/1st London Division January 1915)

- 1st City of London Brigade Royal Field Artillery
- 2nd County of London Brigade Royal Field Artillery
- 3rd County of London Brigade Royal Field Artillery
- 4th County of London Brigade, Royal Field Artillery (Howitzers)
- 1st London Heavy Battery, Royal Garrison Artillery

1st London Divisional Engineers

- 1st London Field Company Royal Engineers (left 23 December 1914)
- 2nd London Field Company, Royal Engineers (left January 1915)
- 1st London Divisional Telegraph Company, Royal Engineers (Signal Company from 1910)

Divisional Royal Army Medical Corps

- 1st London Field Ambulance (left 4 September 1914)
- 2nd London Field Ambulance (eft 21 December 1914)
- 3rd London Field Ambulance (left 21 December 1914)

1st London Divisional Transport and Supply Column, Army Service Corps (left 21 December 1914)

- 1st London Divisional Company (HQ)
- 1st London Brigade Company
- 2nd London Brigade Company
- 3rd London Brigade Company

56th (1/1st London Division) (1916–1919)

167th (1st London) Brigade

- 1/7th Battalion, Duke of Cambridge's Own (Middlesex Regiment)
- 1/8th Battalion, Duke of Cambridge's Own (Middlesex Regiment)
- 1/1st Battalion, London Regiment (Royal Fusiliers)
- 1/3rd Battalion, London Regiment (Royal Fusiliers) (to 58th (2/1st London) Division 31 January 1918)
- 4th Battalion, Prince of Wales's (North Staffordshire Regiment) (from October to November 1917)
- 167th Machine Gun Company, Machine Gun Corps (formed 22 March 1916, moved to 56th Battalion, MGC, 1 March 1918)
- 167th Trench Mortar Battery (formed 14 June 1916)

168th (2nd London) Brigade

- 1/4th (City of London) Battalion, London Regiment (Royal Fusiliers)
- 1/12th Battalion, London Regiment (The Rangers) (to 58th (2/1st London) Division 31 January 1918)
- 1/13th Battalion, London Regiment (The Kensingtons)
- 1/14th Battalion, London Regiment (London Scottish)
- 168th Machine Gun Company, Machine Gun Corps (formed 16 March 1916, moved to 56th Battalion, MGC, 1 March 1918)
- 168th Trench Mortar Battery (formed 13 June 1916)

169th (3rd London) Brigade

- 1/2nd (City of London) Battalion, London Regiment (Royal Fusiliers)
- 1/5th Battalion, London Regiment (London Rifle Brigade)
- 1/9th Battalion, London Regiment (Queen Victoria's) (to 58th (2/1st London) Division 2 February 1918)
- 1/16th Battalion, London Regiment (Queen's Westminster Rifles)
- 169th Machine Gun Company, Machine Gun Corps (formed 17 March 1916, moved to 56th Battalion, MGC 1 March 1918)
- 169th Trench Mortar Battery (formed 17 June 1916)

Divisional Mounted Troops

- B Squadron, 2nd King Edward's Horse (joined March 1916, left 30 May 1916)
- 1st London Divisional Cyclist Company, Army Cyclist Corps (joined April 1916, left May 1916)

56th (1/1st London) Divisional Artillery

- 280th (1/1st London) Brigade, Royal Field Artillery
- 281st (1/2nd London) Brigade, Royal Field Artillery
- 282nd (1/3rd London) Brigade, Royal Field Artillery (left January 1927)
- 283rd (1/4th London) Brigade, Royal Field Artillery (Howitzers) (broken up December 1916)
- 56th Divisional Ammunition Column
- Trench Mortars
  - V.56 Heavy Trench Mortar Battery (formed May 1916, left February 1918)
  - X.56, Y.56 and Z.56 Medium Mortar Batteries (formed mid May 1916, in early February 1918 Z broken up and batteries reorganised to have six 6-inch weapons each)

56th Divisional Engineers

- 2/1st London Field Company, RE (512th Field Company from January 1917)
- 2/2nd London Field Company, RE (513th Field Company from January 1917)
- 1/1st Edinburgh Field Company, Re (joined April 191; 416th Field Company from January 1917))
- 56th (1st London) Divisional Signal Company, RE (from 58th 2/1st London) Division)

Divisional pioneers

- 1/5th Battalion, Cheshire Regiment

Machine Gun Corps

- 193rd Machine Gun Company, Machine Gun Corps (joined 24 December 1916, moved to 56th Battalion, MGC, 1 March 1918)
- 56th Battalion, Machine Gun Corps (formed 1 March 1918)

Royal Army Medical Corps

- 2/1st London Field Ambulance
- 2/2nd London Field Ambulance
- 2/3rd London Field Ambulance
- 56th Sanitary Section (left 1 April 1917)
- 56th Divisional Ambulance Workshop (absorbed into Divisional Supply Column 31 March 1916)

Army Veterinary Corps

- 1st London Mobile Veterinary Section (joined 14 March 1916)

56th Divisional Train, Army Service Corps (from 30th Division (New Army))

- 213th Company
- 214th Company
- 215th Company
- 216th Company

Other

- 247th Divisional Employment Company (joined 23 June 1917)

1st (London) Motor Division (1939)

1st London Infantry Brigade

- 8th Battalion, Royal Fusiliers
- 9th Battalion, Royal Fusiliers
- 1st Battalion, London Irish Rifles

2nd London Infantry Brigade

- 1st Battalion, Queen's Westminsters
- 1st Battalion, London Scottish
- 1st Battalion, London Rifle Brigade

1st London Divisional artillery

- 64th (7th London) Field Regiment, Royal Artillery
- 90th (City of London) Field Regiment, Royal Artillery

1st London Divisional Royal Engineers

- 220th (2nd London) Field Company, Royal Engineers
- 221st (2nd London) Field Company, Royal Engineers
- 222nd (2nd London) Field Company, Royal Engineers
- 223rd (2nd London) Field Park Company, Royal Engineers

1st (London) Motor Divisional Signals, Royal Corps of Signals

1st Battalion, Queen Victoria's Rifles (Motorcycle Battalion)

56th (London) Infantry Division (1940–1946)

1st London Infantry Brigade (became 167th (London) Infantry Brigade on 18 November 1940)

- 8th Battalion, Royal Fusiliers (absorbed into 9th Bn 23 September 1944)
- 9th Battalion, Royal Fusiliers
- 1st Battalion, London Irish Rifles (Royal Ulster Rifles) (from 3 September 1939, left 4 November 1940, rejoined from 23 September 1944 onwards)
- 1st London Infantry Brigade Anti-Tank Company (formed 11 May 1940; became 167th (London) Infantry Brigade Anti-Tank Company, joined 56th Battalion, Reconnaissance Corps, 8 January 1941)
- 15th Battalion, Royal Fusiliers (from 9 November 1940, left 13 February 1941)
- 7th Battalion, Oxfordshire and Buckinghamshire Light Infantry (from 14 February 1941, left 23 September 1944)
- 1st Battalion, London Scottish (Gordon Highlanders) (from 23 September 1944)

2nd London Infantry Brigade (became 168th (London) Infantry Brigade on 18 November 1940, detached from division between 8 April 1943 and 17 October 1943, left 26 September 1944)

- 1st Battalion, Queen's Westminsters (King's Royal Rifle Corps) (left 4 November 1940)
- 1st Battalion, London Scottish (Gordon Highlanders) (left 23 September 1944)
- 1st Battalion, London Rifle Brigade (Rifle Brigade (The Prince Consort's Own)) (left 30 November 1940)
- 2nd London Infantry Brigade Anti-Tank Company (formed 7 February 1940; became 168th (London) Infantry Brigade Anti-Tank Company, joined 56th Battalion, Reconnaissance Corps, 7 April 1941)
- 1st Battalion, London Irish Rifles (Royal Ulster Rifles) (from 4 November 1940, left 23 September 1944)
- 18th Battalion, Royal Fusiliers (from 5 November 1940, left 15 February 1941)
- 10th Battalion, Royal Berkshire Regiment (from 15 February 1941, disbanded 15 May 1944)
- 1st Battalion, Welch Regiment (from 17 May, left 26 September 1944)

3rd London Infantry Brigade (to 2nd London Division 6 October 1939)

- 1st Battalion, The Rangers
- 2nd Battalion, The Rangers
- 1st Battalion, Tower Hamlets Rifles
- 2nd Battalion, Tower Hamlets Rifles

35th Infantry Brigade (from 8 July 1940, became 169th (London) Infantry Brigade on 28 November 1940)

- 2/5th Battalion, Queen's Royal Regiment (West Surrey)
- 2/6th Battalion, Queen's Royal Regiment (West Surrey)
- 2/7th Battalion, Queen's Royal Regiment (West Surrey)
- 35th Infantry Brigade Anti-Tank Regiment (formed 2 October 1940, became 169th (London) Infantry Brigade Anti-Tank Company, joined 56th Battalion, Reconnaissance Corps, 7 April 1941)

201st Guards Motor Brigade (from 23 July, left 17 September 1943)

- 6th Battalion, Grenadier Guards
- 3rd Battalion, Coldstream Guards
- 2nd Battalion, Scots Guards

24th Guards Brigade (from 10 March 1945)

- 5th Battalion, Grenadier Guards (disbanded 28 March 1945)
- 2nd Battalion, Coldstream Guards
- 1st Battalion, Scots Guards
- 1st Battalion, Buffs (Royal East Kent Regiment)

56th (London) Divisional Artillery

- 64th (7th London) Field Regiment, Royal Artillery
- 90th (City of London) Field Regiment, Royal Artillery (left 18 March 1943)
- 113th (Home Counties) Field Regiment, Royal Artillery (from 9 July 1940)
- 65th (8th London) Field Regiment, Royal Artillery (from 23 April 1943)
- 67th (East Surrey) Anti-Tank Regiment, Royal Artillery (from 1 July 1940)
- 115th (North Midland) Field Regiment, Royal Artillery (from 15/16 July 1940, left 31 December 1940)
- 100th Light Anti-Aircraft Regiment, Royal Artillery (formerly 18th Royal Fusiliers; from 3 February 1942, withdrawn 9 November 1944, disbanded 8 January 1945)

56th (London) Divisional Royal Engineers

- 56th (London) Divisional Royal Engineers
  - 220th (2nd London) Field Company
  - 501st Field Company (from 8 September 1939, left 18 March 1943, rejoined 13 October 1943)
  - 221st (2nd London) Field Company (from 3 July 1940)
  - 42nd Field Company (from 9 July 1943, left 3 January 1944)
  - 223rd (London) Field Park Company (left 30 September 1939)
  - 563rd Field Park Company (from 15 January 1940)

Royal Corps of Signals:

- 56th (1st London) Divisional Signals (City of London)

Reconnaissance:

- 1st Battalion, Queen Victoria's Rifles (Motorcycle Battalion, left 21 May 1940)
- 56th Battalion, Reconnaissance Corps (formed 1 January 1941, became 56th Regiment 6 June 1942, transferred to 78th Infantry Division 15 August 1942)
- 44th Regiment, Reconnaissance Corps (transferred from 44th (Home Counties) Infantry Division 8 March 1943, became 44th Reconnaissance Regiment, Royal Armoured Corps 1 January 1944)

Machine guns:

- 1st Battalion, Princess Louise's Kensington Regiment (Machine Gun Battalion, from 11 November 1941, left 20 May 1942)
- 6th Battalion, Cheshire Regiment (Machine Gun Battalion, from 12 January 1943)

56th (London) Armoured Division (1947–1956)

22 Armoured Brigade

- City of London Yeomanry (Rough Riders)
- Westminster Dragoons
- 3/4 County of London Yeomanry (Sharpshooters)
- 42 Royal Tank Regiment
- Queen Victoria's Rifles (King's Royal Rifle Corps)
- Inns of Court Regiment (armoured cars)

168 Lorried Infantry Brigade

- Honourable Artillery Company (infantry battalion)
- 8th Battalion, Royal Fusiliers
- London Scottish
- London Irish Rifles
- Queen's Westminsters (King's Royal Rifle Corps)
- London Rifle Brigade

56th (London) Divisional artillery

- 1 Honourable Artillery Company Regiment, Royal Horse Artillery
- 263 (6th London) Anti-Tank Regiment, Royal Artillery (self-propelled (SP); field artillery from 1951, SP medium artillery from 1954)
- 290 (City of London) Field Regiment, Royal Artillery
- 624th (Royal Fusiliers) Light Anti-Aircraft Regiment, Royal Artillery
- G Locating Battery, Honourable Artillery Company

Engineers:

- 101 Field Engineer Regiment, Royal Engineers

Signals:

- 56 (London) Armoured Divisional Signal Regiment (City of London Signals)

Supply:

- 56 (London) Armoured Divisional Column, Royal Army Service Corps

Medical:

- 167, 168 Field Ambulances, Royal Army Medical Corps

Ordnance:

- 56 (London) Armoured Divisional Ordnance Field Park, Royal Army Ordnance Corps

Electrical and Mechanical Engineers:

- 11, 12, 168 Armoured Workshops, Royal Electrical and Mechanical Engineers

Military Police:

- 56 Divisional Provost Company, Royal Military Police
- 56 Divisional Field Security Section, Royal Military Police

56 (London) Infantry Division (1956–1961)

167 (City of London) Infantry Brigade

- Honourable Artillery Company (infantry battalion)
- 8 Battalion, Royal Fusiliers
- City of London Yeomanry (Rough Riders) (Rifle Brigade) (converted to infantry)

168 (County of London) Infantry Brigade

- 23 London Regiment
- London Scottish
- London Irish Rifles

169 (Greenjacket) Brigade

- Queen Victoria's Rifles (King's Royal Rifle Corps)
- Queen's Westminsters (King's Royal Rifle Corps)
- London Rifle Brigade/Rangers (Rifle Brigade)

Artillery:

- 1 Honourable Artillery Company Regiment, Royal Horse Artillery
- 263 (6th London) Light Regiment, Royal Artillery
- 290 (City of London) Field Regiment, Royal Artillery
- 291 (4th London) Field Regiment, Royal Artillery
- 624th (Royal Fusiliers) Light Anti-Aircraft Regiment, Royal Artillery
- G Locating Battery, Honourable Artillery Company

Engineers:

- 101 (London) Field Engineer Regiment, Royal Engineers

Signals:

- 56 (City of London) Divisional Signal Regiment

Supply:

- 56 (London) Divisional Column, Royal Army Service Corps

Medical:

- 167, 168 Field Ambulances, Royal Army Medical Corps

Ordnance:

- 56 (London) Divisional Ordnance Field Park, Royal Army Ordnance Corps

Electrical and Mechanical Engineers:

- 167, 168, 169 Infantry Workshops, Royal Electrical and Mechanical Engineers

Military Police:

- 56 Divisional Provost Company, Royal Military Police
- 56 Divisional Field Security Section, Royal Military Police

== See also ==
- List of British divisions in World War I
- List of British divisions in World War II
- British Army Order of Battle (September 1939)
- Independent Company
