= 9th (2nd City of London) Battalion, Royal Fusiliers =

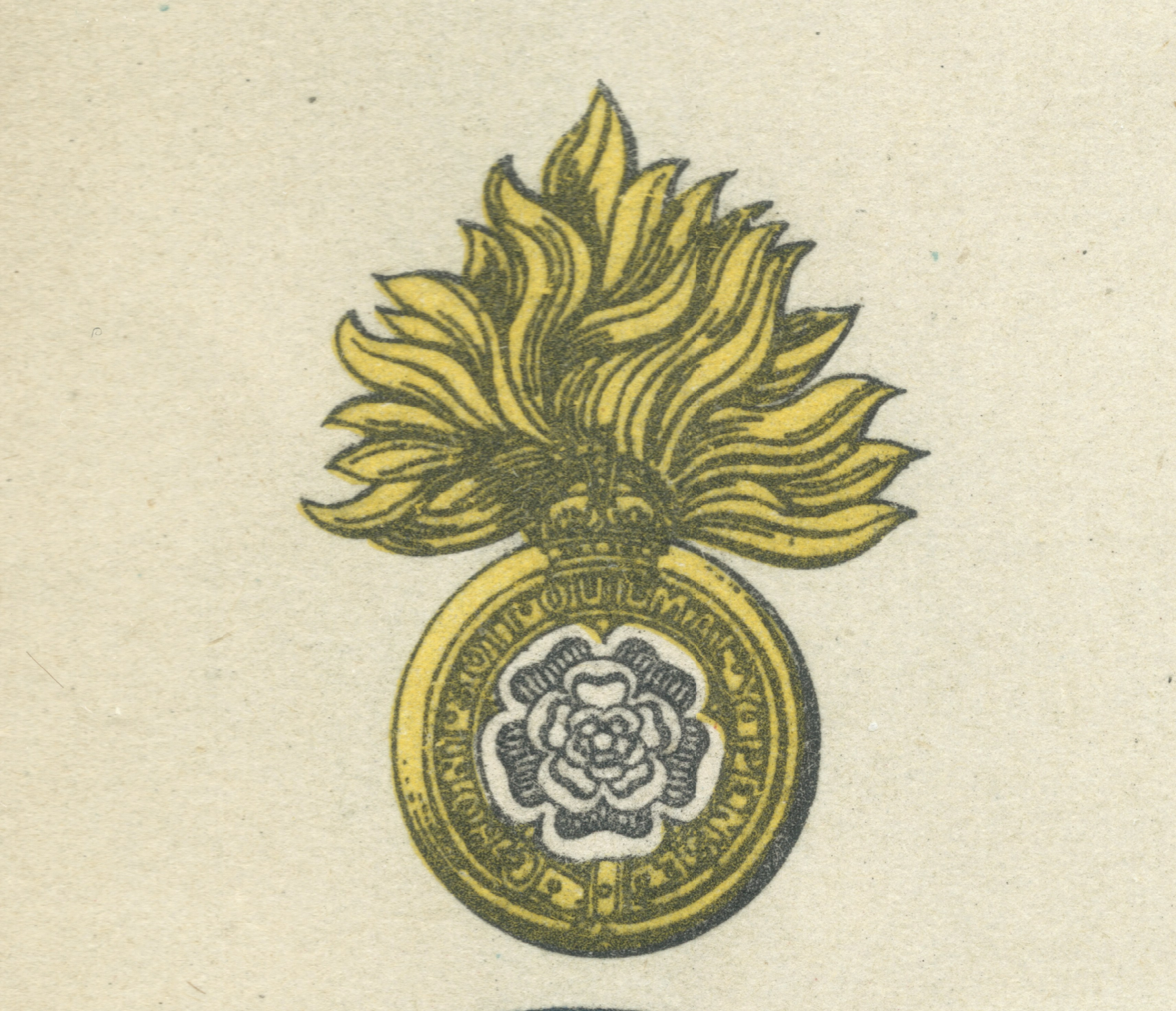
- Cap badge of the Royal Fusiliers 1941
- Active: 31 August 1937–22 September 1944
- Country: United Kingdom
- Branch: Territorial Army
- Role: Infantry
- Size: Battalion
- Part of: 56th (London) Division
- Garrison/HQ: 213 Balham High Road
- Anniversaries: Albuhera Day (16 May)
- Engagements: Tunisia; Salerno; Monte Camino; Anzio; Gothic Line; Argenta Gap; Crossing of the Po

The 9th (2nd City of London) Battalion, Royal Fusiliers, was a Territorial Army (TA) unit of the British Army during World War II. It served in home defence and in Persia and Iraq before entering the Tunisian campaign early in 1943. It then took part in the Salerno landings and subsequent campaign in Italy, including several river crossing and the defence of the Anzio beachhead. The battalion ended the war by storming across the River Po.

== Origin ==
The origin of the 2nd London Regiment lay in an invasion scare of 1859, when large numbers of Rifle Volunteer Corps (RVCs) were formed across Britain. Among these were the 46th (London and Westminster) Middlesex RVC (later the 23rd Middlesex RVC), which became the 2nd Volunteer Battalion of the Regular Army's Royal Fusiliers in 1883. When the Volunteer Force was subsumed into the Territorial Force in 1908, it became the 2nd Battalion of the new London Regiment while retaining its links with the Royal Fusiliers.

The part-time Territorials were mobilised on the outbreak of World War I and the 2nd Londons served in Malta and then on the Western Front in 56th (1st London) Division. It formed 2nd and 3rd Line battalions that fought at Gallipoli and in Egypt as well as on the Western Front.

After the war the TF was reorganised as the Territorial Army (TA), and the battalion was reformed at its drill hall in Tufton Street, Westminster. The London Regiment had fallen into abeyance in 1916 and the battalions were treated as independent regiments affiliated to their previous parent regiments, so the battalion was now designated 2nd (City of London Battalion) London Regiment (Royal Fusiliers), simplified in 1922 to 2nd City of London Regiment (Royal Fusiliers). The battalion was in 167th (1st London) Brigade in 56th (1st London) Division. These became simply '1st London Bde' and '1st London Division' after 47th (2nd London) Division was disbanded in 1935.

The London Regiment was formally disbanded in 1938, the battalion having transferred to the Royal Fusiliers on 31 August 1937 as 9th (2nd City of London) Battalion, Royal Fusiliers (City of London Regiment). (Note: Not to be confused with the 9th (Service) Battalion, a 'Kitchener's Army' unit of the Royal Fusiliers that served in World War I.) In that year the battalion moved its HQ from Tufton St to 213 Balham High Road in South London.

== World War II ==
The formation sign of 56th (London) Division featured Dick Whittington's cat.

=== Mobilisation ===
After the Munich Crisis the TA was doubled in size, and 9th Royal Fusiliers formed a duplicate 2/9th Battalion at South Ruislip with its first officers being commissioned on 14 June; it was shortly afterwards designated as 12th Battalion, Royal Fusiliers. (Note: Not to be confused with the 12th (Service) Battalion, another Kitchener's Army unit.)

Full mobilisation for the TA was ordered on 1 September 1939, two days before the declaration of war; 9th Royal Fusiliers mobilised next day at Balham High Road in 1st London Bde in 1st London Division.

After mobilisation the battalion moved to Croydon on 12 September, and then to Nutley, East Sussex. Organised as a motor division, 1st London Division was designated a 'Julius Caesar' anti-invasion formation in Eastern Command but was only partially equipped. At the time of the Dunkirk evacuation in late May 1940 it was rushed to the threatened area of East Kent, with 9th Royal Fusiliers at Harbledown, Sturry and Bridge. The division was now reorganised as a conventional infantry division under XII Corps. On 18 November 1940 it regained its historic title of 56th (London) Division, and 10 days later 1st London Bde became 167 (1st London) Bde once more.

During 1941, 9th Royal Fusiliers was also stationed at Ashford and New Romney in Kent. On 15 November 1941 56th (L) Division moved to XI Corps in East Anglia, with 9th Royal Fusiliers at Colchester in Essex, moving to Woodbridge, Suffolk, in early 1942, where it camped in a nearby wood. It was now regarded as a field division, and came under War Office control on 21 June, preparatory to moving overseas. 9th Royal Fusiliers was now commanded by Lt-Col E.H. Hillersdon.

=== Iraq ===
In August 1942 the division sailed for the Middle East, 9th Royal Fusiliers embarking on the transport New Holland at Liverpool, and the convoy carrying 56th (L) Division sailed on 25 August 1942. It called at Freetown in Sierra Leone, where the men were issued with tropical kit. It then proceeded via Cape Town to Bombay, where the tropical kit was withdrawn and the troops transshipped to smaller vessels. These sailed on to Basra in Iraq, where the men disembarked on 4 November. 9th Royal Fusiliers then entrained for Kirkuk, a 600 miles (970 km) journey via Baghdad. 56th (L) Division was intended to reinforce Persia and Iraq Command (PAIC), but by the time it arrived, the threat to the Persian oilfields had diminished with the British victory at El Alamein and the lack of German progress at Stalingrad. The troops in PAIC were therefore able to undergo intensive training for service elsewhere. 56th (L) Division was selected for the planned Allied invasion of Sicily (Operation Husky), and its brigades trained in amphibious assault or desert and hill warfare. 167 and 169 Brigades were selected for the latter, carried out in the Dharbund Badzian Pass, some 600 miles (970 km) from Kirkuk.

=== Tunisia ===
56th (L) Division now had to move from Kirkuk via Palestine and Egypt to join Eighth Army in Tunisia, covering approximately 3200 miles between March and 19 April 1943. 9th Royal Fusiliers left on 28 March, some men going to Baghdad by rail, but thereafter the whole journey was by road using battalion transport supplemented by troop carrying vehicles (TCVs). Soon after they arrived and joined X Corps, 167 and 169 Bdes were thrown into the last stages of the Tunisian Campaign, because General Bernard Montgomery stated that he did not want to use an untried division in Husky. 169 Brigade took Djebel Terhouna during the night of 28/29 April, but was driven off the position the following morning, when Montgomery realised that the division needed time to learn battlecraft.

The division went into action again during the final advance on Tunis (Operation Vulcan), 167 Bde attacking 'Razorback Ridge' on the evening of 9 May with 8th and 9th Royal Fusiliers supported by Valentine tanks. Without adequate time for reconnaissance, both battalions moved off over the Djebel es Sourrah feature at 17.35 and advanced across the open valley of Wadi Rheribi covered by a smokescreen fired by the divisional artillery, which also put down concentrations of high explosive on the enemy positions. The advancing troops suffered severe casualties from incoming fire, particularly when the smoke began to clear. The leading companies of 9th Royal Fusiliers reached a wadi running across their front, but this was the line of the enemy defensive barrage, which came down with great accuracy. The men pressed on with mounting casualties; Lt-Col Hillersdon was badly wounded in the leg but carried on commanding the battalion from a tank until he was too weak from blood loss and had to be evacuated, when the command temporarily devolved on Maj J.G. Coleman. Eventually the battalion was ordered to withdraw in the early hours of the following morning. Successes on other fronts meant that X Corps' costly action did not need to be continued, and the remaining Axis troops in Tunisia surrendered on 13 May.

=== Salerno ===
Because of Montgomery's doubts, 56th (L) Division was not in fact used in Operation Husky. Instead it moved back to Tripoli in Libya for further training in combined operations at Zuara, first 'dryshod', then with waterproofed vehicles and landing craft. While the Sicilian campaign continued, planning began for Operations Avalanche and Baytown, the assault landings on mainland Italy. 56th (London) Division was assigned to Avalanche, to land at Salerno. Loading began on 1 September and the assault troops of 56th (L) Division set sail from Tripoli aboard convoy TSS-1 on 3 September.

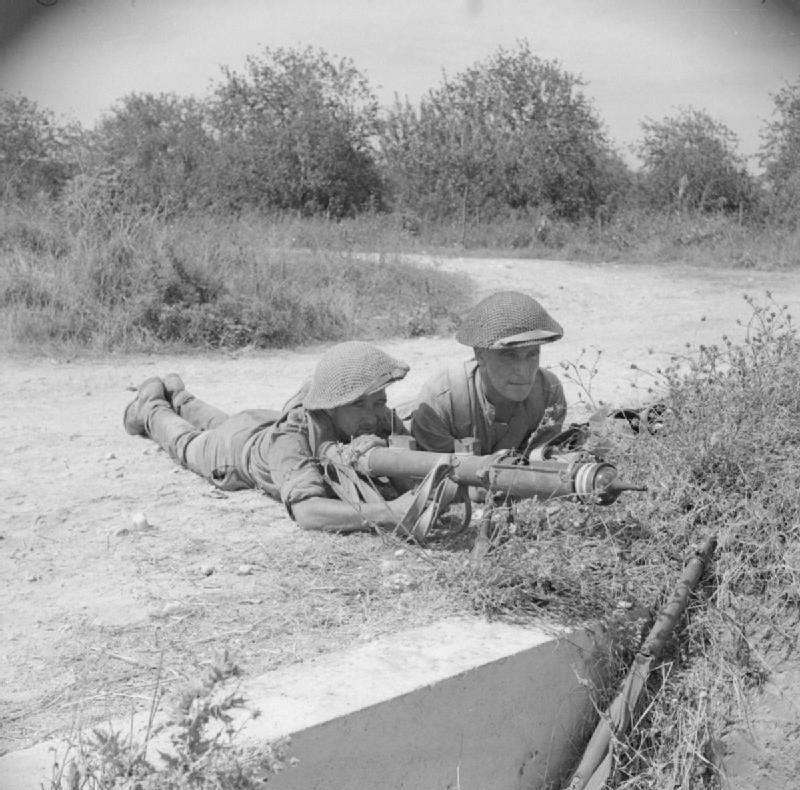
A 9th Royal Fusiliers PIAT team at Salerno.

H-Hour was at 03.30 on 9 September. 167 Bde's leading infantry landing craft touched down at 03.35 covered by naval gunfire, with 8th (right) and 9th (left) Battalions Royal Fusiliers landing either side of the Tusciano river. 9th Royal Fusiliers' objective was the town of Battipaglia. On landing they found that the covering rocket fire had not silenced a German 88mm gun battery, which continued to fire seawards until it was silenced by an Allied destroyer, the naval shells only just clearing the fusiliers. Apart from a position containing four machine guns, which was assaulted by D Company, there was little opposition. Using commandeered transport, including tractors, horses, farm carts and bicycles, the battalion pushed inland and established battalion HQ in Battipaglia by nightfall.

However, because neighbouring units including 8th Royal Fusiliers had not made such good progress, the position at Battipaglia was dangerously isolated. Counter-attacks began at first light on 10 September: the town was almost surrounded and 88 mm guns began systematically destroying the buildings, wounding Lt-Col Hillersdon. German tanks approached and infantry infiltrated through the tall crops around the town. As the pressure grew the battalion was gradually forced out of the town, all its anti-tank guns being knocked out by 13.00, then the carriers and 3-inch mortars of Support Company. A field company of Royal Engineers became involved in the fighting, as well as the battalion's administrative staff, many of them armed with captured Italian and German weapons. By 16.00 Maj Cedric Delforce, in temporary command, had few troops left, and the brunt of the defence fell on D Company, who had linked up with 201 Guards Bde. 3rd Coldstream Guards tried to fight their way forward to hold or regain the town, but they failed, and the remnants of 9th Royal Fusiliers withdrew and joined them at the blocked bridge at Fosso. One 37-man platoon was cut off in the town and remained there for a couple of days, sniping at Germans during the confusion of British air raids on 13 and 14 September, otherwise staying quiet on the top floor of the building that became the German HQ. Most were eventually captured while searching for food and water. On 14 September 167 Bde was relieved and sent to 46th Division's supposedly quieter sector, but the remnant of 9th Royal Fusiliers with the Royal Engineers stayed to hold the Sta Lucia salient under the command of 23rd Armoured Bde. On 16 September it drove back an attack with the help of 64th (7th London) Field Regiment's 25-pounders. By 19 September, the battalion had extemporised new Support Company, armed with Italian Breda machine guns, an 81mm mortar and a 75mm infantry gun. The advancing Eighth Army was now approaching, and the Salerno beachhead was no longer isolated: the Germans withdrew abruptly.

=== Volturno to the Garigliano ===
X Corps began its advance out of the beachhead on the night of 22/23 September and began the pursuit towards Naples, 56th (L) Division moving up on 26 September. 167 Brigade advanced up Route 8, clearing Baronissi and reaching Costa on 30 September, when X Corps entered Naples. By 11 October, the division was on the Volturno Line but 167 Bde's attempt to cross the river on the night of 12/13 October failed when 7th Oxfordshire and Buckinghamshire Light Infantry (OBLI) were spotted while forming up. The brigade continued to keep the enemy pinned along the river. On 15 October, after some patrolling, 9th Royal Fusiliers pushed B Company, across the river, followed by D, C and then the battalion tactical HQ (Tac HQ). Some fighting over the next two days left the battalion in possession of its bridgehead, by which time 169 Bde was approaching from the right. The enemy withdrew into the hills.

This brought the division to the Bernhardt Line, where it was tasked with capturing Monte Camino, blocking the entrance to the Liri Valley. The first attack up 'Bare Arse Ridge' on 6 November by 7th OBLI and 201 Guards Bde failed with heavy casualties. The division then prepared for a full-scale attack (the Battle of Monte Camino) including building Jeep tracks and dumps from which mules supplied the frontline troops in rain and mud while the battalions trained for mountain warfare. The battalions now consisted of a three rifle companies and a reduced HQ Company, in order to maximise rifle strength. Lieutenant-Col J. Sykes-Wright arrived to take over 9th Royal Fusiliers, which had been commanded for the past months by Maj Delforce and then Maj Coleman. 167 Brigade's plan was for a brigade 'Battle Patrol' to clear Bare Arse Ridge as far as Point 727, which would then be held by the depleted 7th OBLI while 8th and 9th Royal Fusiliers passed by to assault the summit (Point 819) by pincer movement. The attack was launched with heavy artillery support on the evening of 2 December, 9th Royal Fusiliers crossing its start line at 17.15. Each man was heavily laden with winter clothing, ammunition and equipment and 48-hour rations. They followed lines of tracer from Bofors guns guiding them through the fading light and the dust thrown up by the bombardment. 9th Royal Fusiliers passed Point 727 at 04.00 and reached the wood that was the forming-up position, but 8th Royal Fusiliers following in single file could not be in position for the assault planned for 06.00. The two COs agreed that 9th Bn would carry out the attack with Y Company of 8th Bn, which arrived at 05.30. B Company of the 9th went round the left corner of the wood and dealt with a series of machine gun posts; then D Company continue of the left, and finally A Company guarded the exposed flank. Y Company of the 8th took Point 819 itself, but 169 Bde's attack on Monte Camino monastery had failed, and the Royal Fusiliers were subjected to heavy fire as they consolidated on the objective. It took seven hours to evacuate each wounded man down the mule track. Holding the position in the rain and cold, the battalions began to suffer cases of trench foot. 201 Guards Bde passed through the position the following night to capture the monastery, but the Fusiliers were not finally relieved until 6 December.

56th (L) Division was next tasked with capturing a bridgehead across the Garigliano. The division moved up to the river on 14 December and spent the next month patrolling across the wide No man's land and reconnoitering the crossing sites. Unlike the Volturno crossing, detailed planning and rehearsal were undertaken. 8th and 9th Royal Fusiliers were to attack side by side, each with some engineers and a company of the depleted 7th OBLI attached to it. The operation was timed for 21.00 on 17 January 1944, and 9th Royal Fusiliers had their assault boats in the water at the correct time, guided by Bofors tracer. A battle patrol went over, followed by a platoon of B Company. The whole of B and D Companies followed, assisted by beachmasters, including Maj Delforce. The flooded river had rendered most of the German S-mines ineffective, and the fusiliers advanced towards the railway embankment at 22.50. Here they ran into opposition and the battle became confused, Tac HQ following the wrong embankment and became involved in a fight with a machine gun position, the CO being captured twice, and escaping both times. The rest of Tac HQ linked up with A Company and engaged the enemy in a farm with all the heavy weapons available, including medium machine guns, PIATs and 2-inch mortars. Having returned, the CO led A Company on to the objective of Salvatito hill while Maj Delforce collected the rest of the battalion and cleared the remaining enemy pockets. By 10.00 next morning the battalion was established in Salvitelle, where it was reinforced by 44th Reconnaissance Regiment, which had been ferried cross the river. German counter-attacks began early on 19 January and were driven off by B Company; that evening another counter-attack was broken in front of the battalion by 56th (L) Division's artillery. Fighting continued in the enclosed country of the bridgehead for several days: D Company's position was captured on 21 January, but the enemy were driven out again by the London Scottish. 9th Royal Fusiliers was relieved on the evening of 23 January. While the battalion was resting at Fontanelle Lt-Col Sykes-Wright left and Maj J.G. Cleghorn was promoted from 8th Royal Fusiliers to take command.

=== Anzio ===
The Allies had carried out an amphibious assault at Anzio on 22 January 1944 with the intention of outflanking the German positions at Monte Cassino, but the enemy had succeeded in sealing off the beachhead, where trench warfare had set in. In early February 56th (L) Division was ordered to pull out and go by sea to reinforce the beachhead. 167 Brigade embarked at Naples on 12 February, each fusilier battalion travelling in one Landing Ship, Tank for HQ and transport, and one Landing Craft Infantry for each of the three companies. They arrived off Anzio at 08.00 next day and immediately came under air attack. The brigade took over part of the line from US troops on the night of 14/15 February, with 9th Royal Fusiliers on the left. At 06.15 on 16 February a strong German counter-attack (Operation Fischfang or 'Catching Fish') developed, accompanied by artillery and mortar fire and air attacks. The close country suited infiltration attacks, and the fighting was confused. At first, 9th Royal Fusiliers held their fire because the German paratroopers' helmets resembled the American helmet: two platoons of A Company and most of D Company were overrun and captured, the remaining platoon of A Company was undetected behind the enemy. With C Company in the rear, only B Company was in action, assisted by a scratch party of drivers and orderlies alongside the mortar platoon and battle patrol. The defence was aided by some American tanks and engineers, who helped with wiring the position and loaned a platoon. However, with information brought in by A Company's platoon and other returning stragglers, the battalion built up a clear picture of the enemy positions and was able to call down accurate artillery support as the fighting continued until 24 February. Thereafter both sides continued raiding until 9th Royal Fusiliers were relieved on the night of 5/6 March. It was evacuated from the beachhead on 8 March and sailed back to Naples.

56th (L) Division was now so weak that the whole division was sent to Egypt to rest and reorganise. 167 Brigade sailed on 28 March from Taranto aboard the troopship Empire Pride. The brigade moved to a hutted camp at Beni Yousef, where the Fusilier battalions were reinforced by a draft of gunners from disbanded anti-aircraft regiments from the Canal Zone, who had been retrained as infantrymen. They were integrated over the next four months.

=== Gothic Line ===
56th (L) Division set sail from Port Said on 12 July and landed at Taranto on 17 July, taking over the transport and equipment of 78th Division, which was leaving for refit in Egypt. On 4 August 56th (L) Division moved to Assisi, where it formed part of the reserve behind Eighth Army, which was preparing for the attack on the Gothic Line (Operation Olive). The offensive opened on 25 August 1944, and once the leading divisions had broken into the German positions, 56th (L) Division was used to widen the breach on 1 September. 169 Brigade captured Mondarno, then 167 Bde, with 8th Royal Fusiliers and 7th OBLI leading, attacked on 4 September, 9th Royal Fusiliers being held back for the capture of the final objective. The initial operation went well, and commanders believed that a breakthrough had been achieved. It was decided to push 9th Royal Fusiliers through before daylight on 5 September. It crossed the start line at midnight, B Company leading with Tac HQ behind, and advanced in the dark over unreconnoitred ground towards enemy positions that had not been located. After half an hour the fusiliers waded across the River Conca, but B Company became separated from the rest of the battalion, and Tac HQ had no protective screen. It reached Croce just after 04.00 and came across Germans digging in; immediately a firefight broke out. Lieutenant-Col Cleghorn ordered B Company to work its way round Croce, but the Germans were in force, and the whole brigade had to deploy in a hurry. At dawn, A Company with platoon of B Company and a troop of tanks was about halfway to its objective, with B and D Companies in rear and C Company in reserve. Little could be done in daylight, and the battalion's positions were shelled all day. A new attack was organised for the evening, with D Company and the battle patrol to go in with artillery support at 21.00. They managed to enter the town but were driven out again. B and C Companies attacked at 03.30 on 6 September, but B was driven out and C pinned down. Some tanks of the 7th Hussars arrived at 08.00 and supported C Company into the town, which was captured by 11.40. B Company was still fighting on the left, so the brigade commander sent up two companies of 8th Royal Fusiliers to bolster the 9th's slender garrison. The town was under constant shellfire and sniping, and several tanks were knocked out. At 14.00 9th Royal Fusiliers had to request help and it was joined by the whole of 8th Bn. The Germans counter-attacked in strength after dark. There followed a night of confused fighting, in which the enemy tanks and infantry slowly regained most of Croce: A Company was withdrawn at 05.00 and the remnants of C Company at 11.15. Both battalions were then withdrawn so that the so that the artillery could bombard the town, and 8th Royal Fusiliers attacked again. They found themselves in a fight with German armour and suffered heavy casualties before British tanks and other units arrived to complete the capture. Both battalions were finally relieved n the night of 8/9 September.

The next task was to penetrate the Germans' reserve position, the Rimini Line. On 13 September 9th Royal Fusiliers took over a defensive position and the rest of 167 Bde passed through to attack the Sensoli Ridge that night. Even 9th Bn's static role was difficult, with numerous pockets of Germans to be rounded up and heavy enemy shellfire on the line when the brigade's attack began. Two nights later the 9th Royal Fusiliers took part in the second phase of the operation, to clear the Mulazzano ridge. The battalion attacked on the brigade's left to capture a spur and then exploit towards Cerasola some 2,000 yards (1,800 m) beyond. It moved off at 22.00 and D Company established a bridgehead over the River Marano. However, A Company then set off up the wrong spur followed by B Company, while Tac HQ advanced up the correct spur. At daybreak A and B Companies were stuck half-way up the right spur with 8th Royal Fusiliers, while the left spur was uncleared. The tank support having arrived, they were sent with D Company to clear the left spur, then crossed to help A and B Companies. Plans for exploitation to Cerasola were dropped, and 9th Royal Fusiliers consolidated the Mulazzano ridge until they were relieved on 21 September.

=== Winter 1944–45 ===
Owing to a shortage of reinforcements in the Mediterranean theatre in 1944, the 9th (2nd London) Bn absorbed the 8th (1st London) Bn, Royal Fusiliers, on 23 September 1944. In compliment to the 8th Bn, the 9th Royal Fusiliers redesignated its A, B C and D Companies as W, X, Y and Z. (Note: Traditionally, some battalions of the Royal Fusiliers designated their companies W, X, Y and Z rather than A, B, C and D.)

On the night of 27/28 September 56th (L) Division attacked Savignano on the Fiumicino river by 169 Bde, supported by a 90-minute barrage fired by the heavily reinforced divisional artillery. Nevertheless the attack failed, as did attempts to renew it on 29/30 September and 1 October. 9th Royal Fusiliers saw some action in these operations, and did some useful patrolling. On 13 October the badly weakened division (168 Bde had been disbanded) was relieved in the line, 167 Bde going to a rest area south of Ancona. 9th Royal Fusiliers remained at the resort of Porto San Giorgio until 11 December.

56th (L) Division returned to the fighting in December, 9th Royal Fusiliers going into action on 19 December to clear the ground between the River Lamone river and the Nariglio Canal, in which it lost 7 officers and 70 other ranks. The fighting continued over Christmas, and then after a pause from 27 to 31 December the fusiliers had to assist in 'cleaning out' the Senio bend. By a silent approach 9th Royal Fusiliers took Il Collegio and a good haul of prisoners on the night of 2/3 January 1945. It was then withdrawn until the spring.

=== Argenta ===
For Eighth Army's Spring offensive in 1945 (Operation Grapeshot), 56th (L) Division was on the right of the line, responsible for the operations on Lake Comacchio to outflank the Senio defences. 9th Royal Fusiliers, after spending most of March resting and training at Bertinoro was brought up to carry out preliminary operations. On 29 March X and Z Companies joined 2nd Commando Bde to assist it in capturing 'The Spit' on the night of 1/2 April, mainly by manhandling their assault boats. The rest of the battalion moved up to San Alberto on the River Reno on 2/3 April, where X and Z Companies rejoined on 4 April. 'Grapeshot' began on the night of 5/6 April, with 167 Bde tasked with clearing 'the Wedge' from the southern tip of Lake Comacchio across the Reno, westward to the Fossa di Navigazione. Y Company and the battle patrol of 9th Royal Fusiliers crossed the Reno without opposition at 17.00 on 5 April, ferried over by Z Company. The plan was for the fusiliers to work their way westwards to link up with the London Irish Rifles' (LIR) bridgehead, but when the artillery preparation began at 21.00 and the LIR attacked, they found that they could not eliminate a German strongpoint on Y Company's route. the plan was therefore changed, Y Company recrossed and the battalion moved round by vehicles to cross behind the LIR. However, the engineers' raft had been sunk and there were only two canvas assault boats for the whole battalion. Y Company and the battle patrol crossed at 03.00 under artillery and mortar fire, but it was unsafe for the rest of the battalion to cross in daylight, so Y Company and the battle patrol had to fight on alone alongside the LIR. Their first capture was a rice factory, along with numerous prisoners and much equipment, after it had been pounded by the artillery. But an attempt by the battle patrol, wading through floodwater to take a pumping station, failed when the sun came up. By 07.30 Y Company was in action against three German tanks at Punta Alberana, and had to fall back a short distance. These positions were held until 21.30, when the rest of 9th Royal Fusiliers crossed under cover of darkness and set up Tac HQ in the rice factory. Z Company was pushed on ahead of Y Company and X Company held in reserve. But W Company advancing on the left was held up, and to prevent Z Company becoming isolated W Company launched a new attack at 11.30 with tank support. There was a pause for 8 to 10 April while the fighting went on elsewhere. On 11 April 56th (L) Division launched Operation Impact Plain to widen the bridgehead on the Wedge. X Company recrossed the Reno and advanced 8,000 yards (7,300 m) along the south bank to assist the London Scottish, reaching the junction of the Reno and Santerno rivers ahead of any other Allied troops. Y Company relieved X Company on 13 April and crossed the Santerno that evening, reaching Camberini.

Everything was now ready for 56th (L) Division to breach the Argenta Gap between the flooded areas in front. An amphibious operation (Impact Royal) failed, but 9th Royal Fusiliers advanced overland towards Bastia on 14 April, only to be held up by a massive minefield laid in the gap. While an engineer company and all of 167 Bde's pioneer platoons tried to clear a path through the minefield, W Company tried to bypass it along the river's edge. The path was cleared by 16.00, and X Company went through with a troop of 10th Hussars' tanks, but were halted at the far end when it became too dark for the tanks to operate. W Company came up alongside, but met resistance. The advance was resumed on 15 April, helped by a heavy ground mist that allowed X Company to surprise the enemy on the line of the railway embankment. A bulldozer cleared a way through the embankment for a tank and X Company advanced on Bastia with this tank, storming a sugar factory on the outskirts of Bastia to find no opposition, but slowed up by having to advance through a lake of treacle. Patrols reported Bastia clear of the enemy, and 9th Royal Fusiliers were relieved by the London Scottish. Soon afterwards 78th Division passed through 56th (L) Division to complete the Germans' rout.

=== Po crossing ===
Having broken out of the Argenta Gap the Allied forces now drove hard for the River Po. On 22 April 167 Bde pushed north of Portomaggiore, with the LIR in the lead. Next day 9th Royal Fusiliers took over, with W Company advancing on the right and Y Company on the left. W Company had to pass through Copparo, which had been captured by the Coldstream Guards, but it took some time for the company, assisted by local Italian partisans, to clear the town of snipers. Meanwhile X Company came up to a canalised river with all the bridges destroyed and had to wait for an ARK bridge to come up before the tanks could cross. The battalion then pushed on steadily towards the Po. On 24 April Z Company was across the Canal Bianco, but this was too wide for an ARK, and the engineers had to build a Bailey bridge before the tanks (12th Royal Tank Regiment) could cross. While that was being built, 9th Royal Fusiliers and the tank squadron commander pushed on to reconnoitre the last obstacle before the great river. The first vehicle over the Bailey bridge was a tank with a Scissors bridge, which crossed the obstacle in 15 minutes, while W and Y Companies pushed on. The fusiliers and the tanks reached the bank of the Po at Alberone on the morning of 25 April and opened fire on the Germans who were retreating across the river by boat. Large numbers of prisoners were taken before they could cross. The brigade commander ordered the battalion to 'bounce' the river if possible, and by 11.15 for canvas assault boats arrived. With covering fire from X and Y Companies and the divisional artillery, Sergeant Mitchell with three men crossed the 600 yards (550 m) -wide river in the first boat at 13.45 and landed unopposed; they then began to clear enemy parties from the bank. As other boats arrived – Lieutenant Duthaler of the battle patrol swam the river to bring back one from the German side – the battalion crossed. X Company was across by 16.35 and two sections of Y Company by 1715, but they were now meeting opposition. During the afternoon the Germans counter-attacked X Company, but the attack was broken up by a defensive fire task fired by the divisional artillery. That evening the rest of 56th (L) Division crossed using amphibious vehicles.

The Allies continued pursuing the beaten enemy. 56th (L) Division reached Venice on 29 April. Here it was halted due to shortage of fuel. The Surrender of Caserta came into force on 2 May, ending hostilities in the Italian theatre. 56th (L) Division was made responsible for protecting lines of communication to the disputed city of Trieste in the immediate aftermath of the fighting. 9th (2nd London) Bn, Royal Fusiliers, celebrated the regimental festival of Albuhera Day (16 May) outside the city. The battalion was still in Trieste on 6 April 1946 when the battalion formally passed into suspended animation.

== Postwar ==
Formation sign of 56th (London) Armoured Division

When the TA was reconstituted on 1 January 1947 the 9th and 12th Battalions were reformed at Balham High Road and combined as 624 (Royal Fusiliers) Light Anti-Aircraft Regiment, Royal Artillery. It served as the LAA regiment of 56th (London) Armoured Division.

When Anti-Aircraft Command was disbanded in 1955 there was a major reduction in the number of AA units, and 624 LAA absorbed 526 (Mixed) LAA/Searchlight Regiment, RA (27th London Electrical Engineers), which formed R Battery. Later its title was changed to 624 LAA Rgt (9th Bn Royal Fusiliers (City of London Regiment)).

There were further reductions in the TA. On 1 May 1961, 624 LAA Rgt reconverted back to infantry and merged into 8th (1st City of London) Battalion, Royal Fusiliers, to form the City of London Battalion, Royal Fusiliers.

== Battle Honours ==
The following Battle Honours awarded to the Royal Fusiliers during World War II were attributable to the 9th Battalion:

Djebel Tebaga, North Africa 1943, Salerno, St Lucia, Battipaglia, Teano, Monte Camino, Garigliano Crossing, Damiano, Anzio, Gothic Line, Coriano, Croce, Valli di Comacchio, Argenta Gap, Italy 1943-45

(The honours listed in bold were among those chosen by the Royal Fusiliers to be emblazoned on the King's Colour of each battalion)
