= 168th (2nd London) Brigade =

East London Brigade 2nd London Brigade 168th (2nd London) Brigade 2nd London Infantry Brigade 168th (London) Infantry Brigade 168th (Lorried) Infantry Brigade
- Active: 1888–1919; 1920–1946; 1947–1961
- Country: United Kingdom
- Branch: British Army
- Type: Infantry; Motorised infantry Lorried infantry
- Size: Brigade
- Part of: 56th (London) Infantry Division; 56th (London) Armoured Division
- Nicknames: "The Black Cats" (Second World War, divisional nickname)
- Engagements: First World War; Second World War

Commanders
- Notable commanders: The Lord Cavan

The 168th (2nd London) Brigade was an infantry brigade formation of the British Army that saw service during both the First and the Second World Wars. Throughout its existence, serving under many different titles and designations, the brigade was an integral to the 56th (London) Infantry Division. It served on the Western Front during the First World War and in the Italian Campaign during the Second World War. It was finally disbanded in the 1960s.

== Origin ==
The Volunteer Force of part-time soldiers was created following an invasion scare in 1859, and its constituent units were progressively aligned with the Regular British Army during the later 19th Century. The Stanhope Memorandum of December 1888 introduced a Mobilisation Scheme for Volunteer units, which would assemble in their brigades at key points in case of war. In peacetime these brigades provided a structure for collective training.

The East London Brigade was one of the formations organised at this time. The Commanding Officer of the Grenadier Guards and his Adjutant were ex officio the brigade commander and Brigade major, while the Grenadier Guards' orderly room at Wellington Barracks acted as Brigade Headquarters. The assembly point for the brigade was at Caterham Barracks, the Guards' depot conveniently situated for the London Defence Positions along the North Downs. The brigade's original composition was:

East London Brigade

- 1st London Rifle Volunteer Corps (London Rifle Brigade)
- 2nd London Rifle Volunteer Corps (City of London Rifles)
- 3rd London Rifle Volunteer Corps
- 1st Tower Hamlets Rifle Volunteer Brigade
- 2nd Tower Hamlets Rifle Volunteer Corps
- 15th Middlesex (The Customs and Docks) Rifle Volunteer Corps
- 24th Middlesex Rifle Volunteer Corps (Post Office Rifles)
- Supply Detachment, Army Service Corps
- Bearer Company, Medical Staff Corps

== Territorial Force ==
This organisation was carried over into the Territorial Force (TF) created under the Haldane Reforms in 1908, the East London Brigade becoming the 2nd London Brigade in 1st London Division. The commander and staff continued to be provided by the Grenadier Guards up to the outbreak of war in 1914. All of the Volunteer Battalions in the Central London area became part of the all-Territorial London Regiment and were numbered sequentially through the London brigades and divisions:

2nd London Brigade

- 5th (City of London) Battalion, London Regiment (London Rifle Brigade)
- 6th (City of London) Battalion, London Regiment (City of London Rifles)
- 7th (City of London) Battalion, London Regiment
- 8th (City of London) Battalion, London Regiment (Post Office Rifles)

The 1st Tower Hamlets became the 4th Londons and transferred to the 1st London Brigade, while the 2nd Tower Hamlets and 15th Middlesex combined to form the 17th Londons (Poplar and Stepney Rifles) and transferred to the 5th London Brigade in the 2nd London Division.

== First World War ==
The division was mobilised soon after the outbreak of the First World War in August 1914. According to the Territorial and Reserve Forces Act 1907 soldiers of the Territorial Force were only able for overseas service and, when asked to volunteer for overseas service, the overwhelming majority of the men of the brigade (and the division) chose to do so. The men who didn't, together with the many new recruits, were formed into new 2nd Line battalions and brigades, the 2/2nd London Brigade, assigned to the 2/1st London Division, both later to become 174th (2/2nd London) Brigade and 58th (2/1st London) Division respectively. The battalions were also redesignated, adopting the '1/' prefix (1/5th Londons) to distinguish them from the 2nd Line battalions, which became '2/', 2/5th Londons.

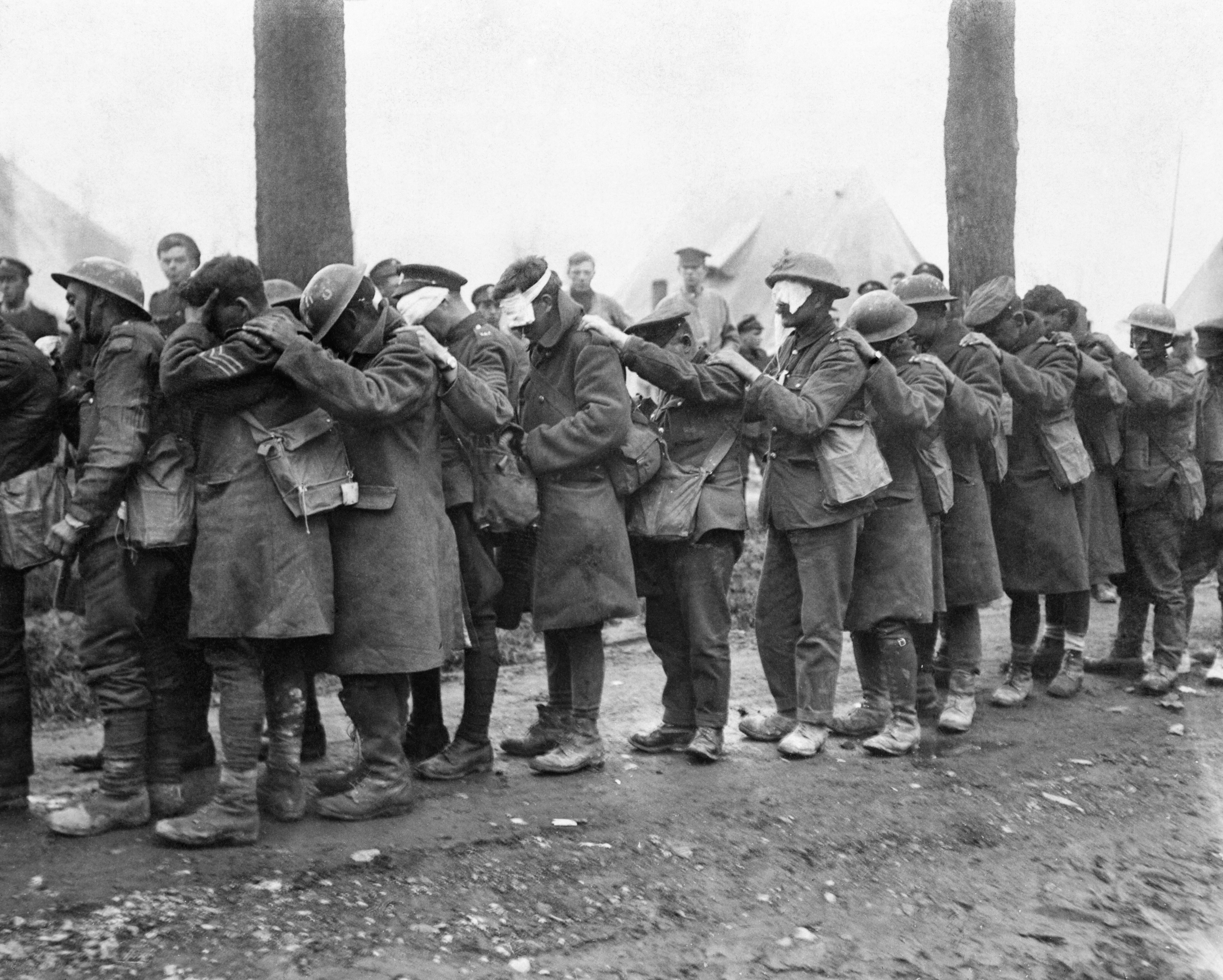
British soldiers blinded by poison gas. Vera Brittain commented: "Great mustard-coloured blisters, blind eyes, all sticky and stuck together, always fighting for breath, with voices a mere whisper, saying their throats are closing and they know they will choke."

However, the 2nd London Brigade was broken up, as was the 1st London Division, in November 1914 when most of its battalions were posted elsewhere, either to reinforce the British Expeditionary Force (BEF) on the Western Front or to relieve troops of the Regular Army around the British Empire for service in France and Belgium.

In February 1916, however, the division was reformed in France, to be known as the 56th (1/1st London) Division and the brigade was reconstituted, now numbered as the 168th (1/2nd London) Brigade, with battalions from other brigades and divisions, the 1/4th London Regiment (Royal Fusiliers) originally coming from 167th (1/1st London) Brigade, the 12th, 13th and 14th Londons the latter two originally coming from 140th (1/4th London) Brigade, 47th (1/2nd London) Division, and the 12th from 3rd London Brigade.

With the rest of the division, the brigade was destined to see service in the trenches of the Western Front for the rest of the war, seeing first action at the Gommecourt salient, fighting in late June/early July 1916 alongside the 46th (North Midland) Division in an diversionary attempt to distract the German Army's attention away from the impending Somme offensive. The attack was a failure, and served only to cause heavy casualties on both attacking divisions, with 56th Division suffering nearly 5,000 losses.

The division also fought on the Hindenburg Line in March 1917, followed by the battles of Arras, Langemarck, Passchendaele (also known as Third Ypres), Cambrai (which saw the first use of large numbers tanks in warfare), Second battles of the Somme, Albert, and the Hundred Days Offensive, which saw the First World War eventually ending on 11 November 1918. Throughout its two years of combat, the 56th (1/1st London) Division had suffered well over 35,000 casualties, with the great majority of them being in the infantry, commonly nicknamed the "Poor Bloody Infantry".

=== Order of battle ===
The brigade was composed as follows during the war:

- 1/5th (City of London) Battalion, London Regiment (London Rifle Brigade) (left November 1914)
- 1/6th (City of London) Battalion, London Regiment (City of London Rifles) (left November 1914)
- 1/7th (City of London) Battalion, London Regiment (left November 1914)
- 1/8th (City of London) Battalion, London Regiment (Post Office Rifles) (left November 1914)
- 1/4th (City of London) Battalion, London Regiment (Royal Fusiliers) (from February 1916)
- 1/12th (County of London) Battalion, London Regiment (The Rangers) (from February 1916, left January 1918)
- 1/13th (County of London) Battalion, London Regiment (Kensington) (from February 1916)
- 1/14th (County of London) Battalion, London Regiment (London Scottish) (from February 1916)
- 168th Machine Gun Company, Machine Gun Corps (formed 16 March 1916, moved to 56th Battalion, Machine Gun Corps 1 March 1918)
- 168th Trench Mortar Battery (formed 13 June 1916)

In early 1918, due to a manpower shortage, it was decided to reduce British infantry brigades serving in France and Belgium from four to three battalions. As a consequence, on 31 January 1918, the 1/12th Londons were transferred to the 175th (2/3rd London) Brigade, 58th (2/1st London) Division where they absorbed the 2/12th Battalion and, once again, became the 12th Battalion.

== Between the wars ==
The Territorial Force was disbanded after the Great War and later reformed in 1920 and renamed in the same year as the Territorial Army. The division and the brigade were also reformed as 168th (2nd London) Infantry Brigade, with the same composition it had before the First World War and would remain this way for much of the inter-war period.

In 1921, however, the 7th (City of London) Battalion, London Regiment and 8th (City of London) Battalion were amalgamated to create the 7th (City of London) Battalion, London Regiment (Post Office Rifles). The 8th Battalion was replaced in the brigade by the Honourable Artillery Company Infantry Battalion. The following year they dropped the 'battalion' from their title, becoming simply, for example, 6th City of London Regiment (City of London Rifles).

In the late 1930s the need to increase the anti-aircraft defences of the United Kingdom, particularly so for London and Southern England, was addressed by converting a number of Territorial Army infantry battalions into anti-aircraft or searchlight units, of either the Royal Engineers or Royal Artillery. As a result, in 1935, the 6th City of London Regiment (City of London Rifles) was also converted, transferring to the Royal Engineers and becoming 31st (City of London Rifles) Anti-Aircraft Battalion, Royal Engineers, joining 28th (Themes and Medway) Anti-Aircraft Group, part of 1st Anti-Aircraft Division, converted from the Headquarters of 47th (2nd London) Infantry Division. In the same year the 7th London Regiment (Post Office Rifles) was transferred to the Royal Engineers and converted into 32nd (7th City of London) Anti-Aircraft Battalion, Royal Engineers, becoming part of 27th (Home Counties) Anti-Aircraft Group of the 1st Anti-Aircraft Division. With the disbandment of 47th (2nd London) Infantry Division in early 1936 the 56th Division was redesignated as The London Division and the brigade became simply the 2nd London Infantry Brigade. To replace those battalions converted were the 13th (County of London) Battalion, London Regiment (Kensington) and the 14th (County of London) Battalion, London Regiment (London Scottish), both previously from 140th (4th London) Infantry Brigade of the now disbanded 47th Division.

In 1938 all British infantry brigades were reduced from four to three battalions and so the Honourable Artillery Company Infantry Battalion was transferred elsewhere to become an Officer Cadet Training Unit. In the same year the London Regiment was disbanded and the battalions all became part of their own parent regiments: the London Rifle Brigade became part of the Rifle Brigade (Prince Consort's Own) and was redesignated the London Rifle Brigade, the 13th Londons became part of the Middlesex Regiment (Duke of Cambridge's Own) and became the Princess Louise's Kensington Regiment, the 14th Londons became part of the Gordon Highlanders and became the London Scottish. Again in 1938 the Kensingtons was converted into a machine gun battalion and left the brigade, coming under command of London District, and was replaced in the brigade by the Queen's Westminsters (King's Royal Rifle Corps), previously from the 140th (4th London) Infantry Brigade from the now disbanded 47th Division. The battalion had previously been the 9th (County of London) Battalion, London Regiment (Queen Victoria's) and, in 1922, 9th London Regiment (Queen Victoria's) The final change of 1938 saw the brigade, in line with the rest of the London Division, reorganised and converted into a motorised infantry brigade/division, although with very little equipment.

== Second World War ==
The brigade, together with the rest of the division and most of the rest of the Territorial Army, was mobilised between late August and early September 1939. On 1 September 1939 Poland was invaded by the German Army, and two days before the Second World War officially began, when both Britain and France declaring war on Germany. Inadequately armed and equipped, the brigade began home defence and training duties and, as some units were understrength, had to be brought up to their War Establishment strength through large drafts of militiamen (essentially conscripts who had only just completed basic training in late October 1939).

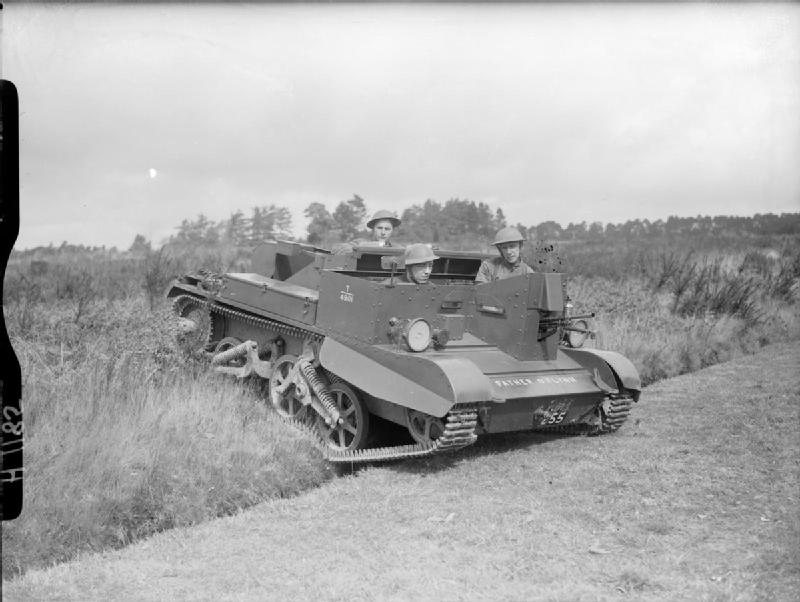
Bren gun carrier, bearing the name 'Father O'Flynn' of the 1st Battalion, London Irish Rifles, Sussex, during the winter of 1939.

The division was not sent to join the British Expeditionary Force (BEF) in France, but instead moved to Kent in April 1940, joining XII Corps. When most of the BEF was forced to retreat to Dunkirk during the disastrous Battle of France in mid-1940 the division assumed a defensive posture and alternated between coastal defence duties and training to repel an expected German invasion which never arrived, due mainly to events that happened in the Battle of Britain and the German invasion of the Soviet Union in mid-1941.

In June 1940 the division was reorganised as a standard infantry division with the arrival of a third brigade, the 35th Infantry, from the 12th (Eastern) Infantry Division, which had fought in France and suffered severe losses. On 18 November 1940 the division was redesignated 56th (London) Infantry Division and on 28 November the 2nd London Infantry Brigade was renumbered as the 168th (London) Infantry Brigade. November 1940 also saw another change to the 168th Brigade, with both the 1st Battalion, Queen's Westminsters and 1st Battalion, London Rifle Brigade being posted elsewhere. They were replaced in the brigade by 1st Battalion, London Irish Rifles, previously from the 167th (London) Infantry Brigade and the 18th Battalion, Royal Fusiliers, a battalion raised specifically for war service only, created a few months before in June–July. The 18th were posted elsewhere in mid-February 1941 and replaced by 10th Battalion, Royal Berkshire Regiment, another unit raised for war service, created in September 1940. Prior to being the 10th Battalion, it was the 50th (Holding) Battalion. The 18th Royal Fusiliers was later transferred to the Royal Artillery in late 1941 and converted into 100th Light Anti-Aircraft Regiment and became the light anti-aircraft regiment for the 56th Division when it joined in February 1942 and served for the rest of the war.

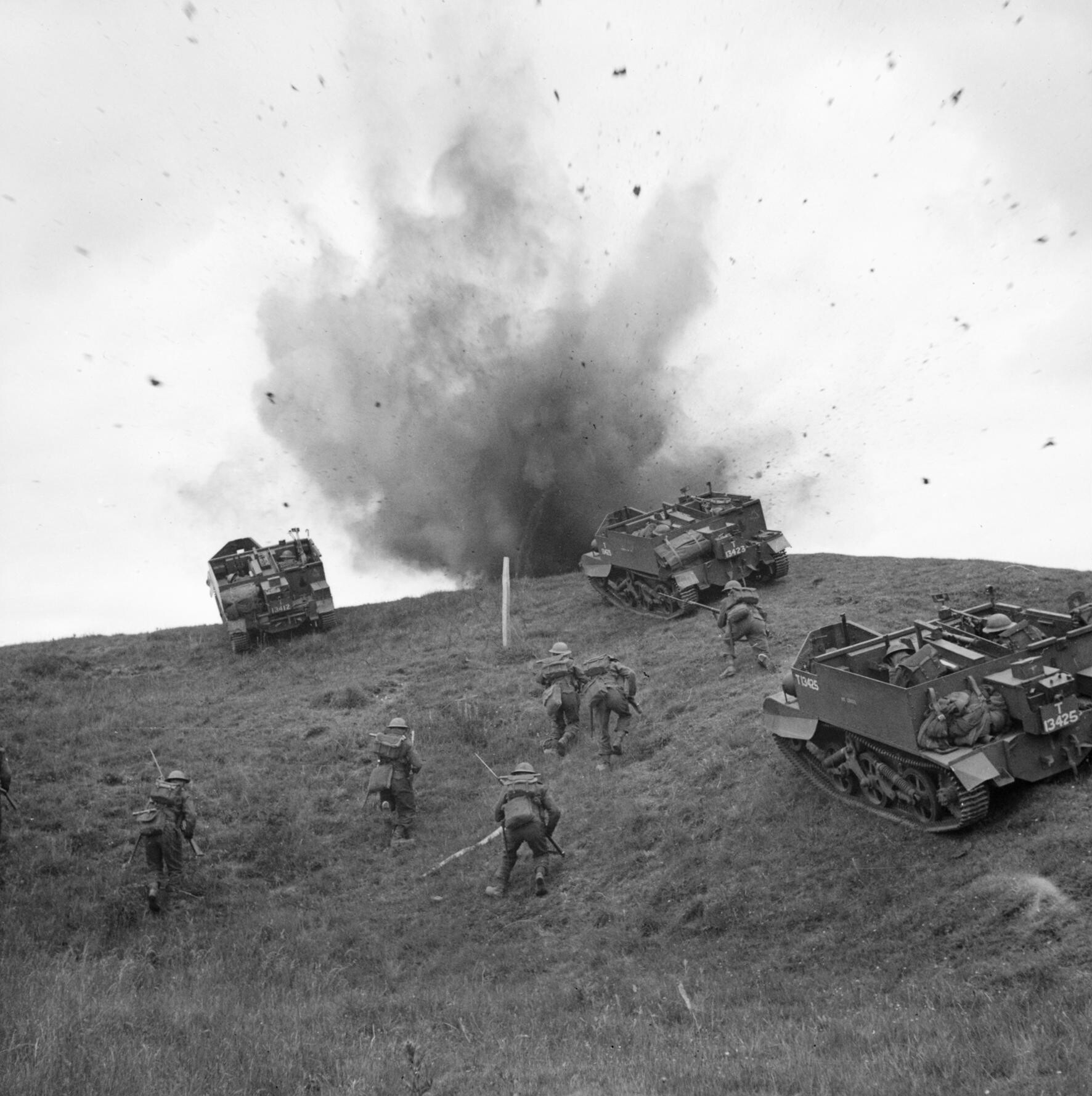
Universal Carriers and infantrymen of the 10th Battalion, Royal Berkshire Regiment advance 'under fire' during training near Sudbury, Suffolk, 10 June 1942.

The 168th Brigade and the rest of 56th Division, now composed largely of a mixture of pre-war Territorials, Regulars and wartime volunteers, moved to Suffolk in June 1942 where they were inspected by General Sir Bernard Paget, at the time Commander-in-Chief, Home Forces. Another guest was His Majesty King George VI. On 25 August 1942, the 56th Division left the United Kingdom and moved to the Middle East where it served with the 5th Infantry Division in III Corps, part of the British Tenth Army under Persia and Iraq Command. The division was ordered to move to Egypt in March 1943 and thence forward to Libya, and the front, in April.

On 8 April 1943, however, the 168th Brigade was detached from the 56th Division and initially became an independent brigade group, with 90th (City of London) Field Regiment of the Royal Artillery and 501st (London) Field Company, Royal Engineers, both under command. On 29 May 1943, the brigade was transferred to the understrength 50th (Northumbrian) Infantry Division, which had suffered heavy casualties and lost the 150th Brigade the previous summer in Battle of Gazala. In July 1943, with the 50th Division, the 168th Brigade fought in the invasion of Sicily, landing on D-Day+3, yet the brigade suffered comparatively light casualties in the short campaign (10th Royal Berkshires had suffered 109 casualties, 26 of them KIA whereas 1st London Irish had 160, with 40 KIA).

In October the 50th Infantry Division, along with the 51st (Highland) Infantry Division and 7th Armoured Division, was chosen by General Bernard Montgomery, Commander of the British Eighth Army, to be returned to the United Kingdom to spearhead the invasion of Normandy. On 17 October the 168th Brigade rejoined the rest of the 56th Division fighting in Italy and making it a four-brigade division, as the 201st Guards Brigade joined on 23 July to replace the 168th and only left on 3 January 1944. The division, part of British X Corps and under command of Mark Clark's U.S. Fifth Army, had just seen fierce fighting in the Salerno landings. Together with the rest of the division the brigade advanced up Italy, and crossed the Volturno. By late 1943, however, together with the rest of the Allied Armies in Italy, the brigade was held up in front of the formidable Winter Line defences, with the brigade and division fighting near the Bernhardt Line.

In mid-January 1944 the brigade, still fighting on the Bernhardt Line, crossed the Garigliano river as part of the First Battle of Monte Cassino where Private George Allan Mitchell of the 1st Battalion, London Scottish gained the Victoria Cross, the first and only for the regiment and division during the war.

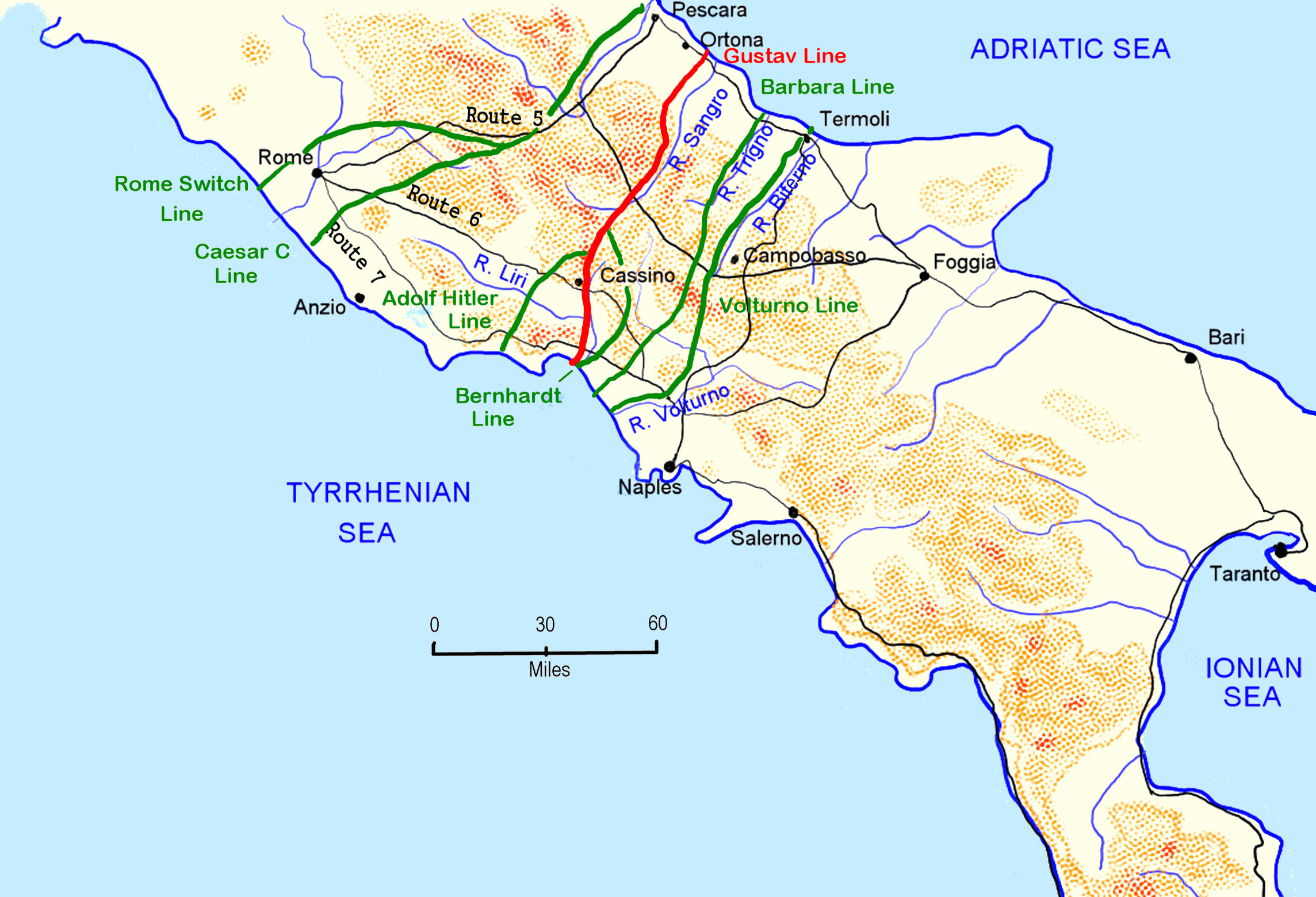
German-prepared defensive lines south of Rome.

Shortly afterwards, on 30 January, the Commander of British X Corps, Lieutenant-General Sir Richard McCreery, was ordered to send a brigade to strengthen the Anzio bridgehead. The 168th Brigade was chosen and was, again, detached from the division to temporarily come under command of the British 1st Infantry Division, at the time fighting at Anzio and under command of U.S. VI Corps. The 168th Brigade landed at Anzio on 3 February where, soon after arrival, the battalions were almost immediately thrown into battle as the Germans launched a counterattack and the London Scottish, as vanguard of the brigade and supported by Sherman tanks of the 46th Royal Tank Regiment, launched their own spirited counterattack in an attempt to relieve the 3rd Brigade (1st Dukes, 2nd Foresters, 1st KSLI), of British 1st Division, which was surrounded, in what was known to both sides as the "Thumb", by Campoleone station and the lateral road, and was virtually cut off, taking heavy casualties. The London Scottish, supported by 46th RTR, "fought their way forward over sodden ground under heavy German fire in a driving rain", ending up some 400 yards short of the lateral road which shored up the right flank long enough to enable the 3rd Brigade to withdraw, under cover of nightfall, without further loss. However, the brigade had to leave behind much of its equipment and the London Scottish had, in just a few short hours of battle, sustained over 100 casualties. In its first action at Anzio the brigade helped to repel a major counterattack, potentially saving the British 1st Division from destruction, in some of the fiercest fighting endured by soldiers of either side on the Italian Front thus far. Indeed, Albert Kesselring, the Commander of the German forces in Italy "believed that the Fourteenth Army had overestimated the strength of VI Corps and that the attack should have commenced at least twenty-four hours earlier, before the arrival of the 168th Brigade". The 168th Brigade reverted to control of 56th Division on 15 February when the 56th Divisional Headquarters began to land. The brigade continued to fight for nearly six weeks in the severe battles at Anzio where even senior officers were not always safe, such as was the case with Major-General Ronald Penney, GOC British 1st Division, wounded by shellfire on 17 February and the GOC 56th Division, Major-General Gerald Templer, took command of both the 1st and 56th divisions, until 23 February when Penney took command of 1st Division again. Over a month later, the heavily battered brigade was relieved in the line by 17th Infantry Brigade, of the British 5th Infantry Division, in late March 1944 and was withdrawn to Egypt to rest and refit, and was to remain there until mid-July.

The brigade had suffered 50% casualties, the highest casualty rate of the three brigades of 56th Division, and was brought up to strength mainly with mainly ex-anti-aircraft gunners of the Royal Artillery who had been retrained as line infantry (most of whom were commented by officers to be of excellent quality as infantrymen), together with those many wounded returning from hospital. In only six weeks at Anzio the brigade had seen extremely heavy casualties with one of its battalions – 1st London Irish Rifles – suffering 582 casualties (32 officers and 550 other ranks), with only 12 officers and 300 other ranks embarking for Egypt, most of them returning wounded. Even worse was suffered by the 10th Battalion, Royal Berkshire Regiment, which had been reduced to around 40 men fit for duty. As a result of its high casualty rate, and a growing shortage of infantry replacements, the battalion was disbanded, with most of its men volunteering as replacements for the other battalions of the brigade. To replace the Royal Berkshires was the 1st Battalion, Welch Regiment, a Regular Army unit which had already seen extensive service in the Middle East and Crete. While in Egypt the brigade was inspected by General Sir Bernard Paget, now Commander-in-Chief, Middle East Command. He had visited them almost two years before in Suffolk when the division was preparing for overseas service.

The reorganised brigade landed at Taranto, Italy, on 17 July 1944 and soon afterwards were visited again by H.M. The King George VI, who visited them almost exactly two years before. Now under Eighth Army command, the division fought in the battles for the Gothic Line (Operation Olive, where the Eighth Army suffered 14,000 casualties, at nearly 1,000 a day), in particular the Battle of Gemmano which saw further heavy casualties, with nearly half the total casualties for Olive (6,000) in the 56th Division. A complete reorganisation of the division was needed. The brigade was pulled out of the line on 21 September and due to the severe shortage of manpower, biting particularly hard in the Mediterranean theatre (all available replacements had been used up and although 5,000 ex-anti-aircraft gunners had been transferred to the infantry to be retrained, they had yet to complete their training and would only be available in October), that plagued the British Army at this time, and the heavy casualties in the brigade (1st Welch only mustered 320 all ranks), it was decided to disband two brigades (the other being 18th Infantry of 1st Armoured Division) to make up for the infantry shortage. As a consequence, the brigade became non-operational on 23 September 1944 and both the 1st London Scots and 1st London Irish transferring to 167th (London) Brigade and 1st Welch Regiment reducing to a small cadre of 5 officers and 60 other ranks, with the remainder transferring to the Queen's of 169th (Queen's) Brigade (as a Regular battalion it could not be disbanded) and later transferring to 1st Infantry Brigade (Guards). The 168th Brigade Headquarters was finally disbanded on 1 January 1945, as were all the units under command. To replace the brigade was 43rd Independent Gurkha Infantry Brigade and later 24th Infantry Brigade (Guards).

=== Order of battle ===
168th Infantry Brigade was constituted as follows during the war:

- 1st Battalion, Queen's Westminsters (King's Royal Rifle Corps) (left 4 November 1940)
- 1st Battalion, London Scottish, (Gordon Highlanders) (left 23 September 1944)
- 1st Battalion, London Rifle Brigade (Rifle Brigade (Prince Consort's Own)) (left 30 November 1940)
- 2nd London Infantry Brigade Anti-Tank Company (formed 7 February 1940, redesignated 27 November 1940)
- 168th (London) Infantry Brigade Anti-Tank Company (redesignated 28 November 1940, joined 56th Reconnaissance Battalion 8 January 1941)
- 1st Battalion, London Irish Rifles, (Royal Ulster Rifles) (from 4 November 1940, left 23 September 1944)
- 18th Battalion, Royal Fusiliers (from 5 November 1940, left 15 February 1941)
- 10th Battalion, Royal Berkshire Regiment (from 15 February 1941, disbanded 15 May 1944)
- 168th (London) Infantry Brigade Support Company (from 19 to 27 May 1943)
- 1st Battalion, Welch Regiment (from 17 May, left 26 September 1944)

From September 1944 the following cadres were under command:,

- 1st Battalion, Welch Regiment (from 27 September, left 19 October 1944)
- 8th Battalion, Royal Fusiliers (from 27 September, left 23 October, rejoined 28 November, disbanded 17 December 1944)
- 7th Battalion, Oxfordshire and Buckinghamshire Light Infantry (from 27 September, disbanded 23 October 1944)
- 1st Battalion, Buffs (Royal East Kent Regiment) (from 5 until 16 October 1944)
- 9th (Yorkshire Dragoons) Battalion, King's Own Yorkshire Light Infantry (from 5 until 16 October, rejoined 23 October, disbanded 31 December 1944)
- 14th Battalion, Sherwood Foresters (from 5 until 16 October, rejoined 23 October, disbanded 31 December 1944)
- 42nd Light Anti-Aircraft Regiment, Royal Artillery (from 5 to 16 October 1944)

=== Commanders ===
The following officers commanded 168th Brigade during the war:

- Brigadier G.M.B. Portman (until 25 February 1942)
- Brigadier K.C. Davidson (from 25 February 1942 until 19 May 1944)
- Brigadier F.R.G. Matthews (from 19 May until 3 October 1944)
- Lieutenant Colonel O.G. Brooke (Acting, from 3 to 20 October 1944)
- Lieutenant Colonel D.J.B. Houchin (Acting, from 20 to 23 October 1944)
- Lieutenant Colonel G.E. Oliver (Acting, from 23 October to 8 December 1944)
- Lieutenant Colonel G.P. Gofton-Salmond (Acting, from 8 to 31 December 1944)
- Lieutenant Colonel A.J.B. Tarrant (Acting, from 31 December 1944)

== Post-war ==
The brigade was reformed again in the Territorial Army in 1947, this time as 168th (Lorried) Infantry Brigade, assigned to the 56th Division which was reorganised as an armoured formation, 56th (London) Armoured Division.

168 Lorried Infantry Brigade

- 8th Battalion, Royal Fusiliers, at Bloomsbury
- London Rifle Brigade/Rangers at Finsbury
- London Scottish at Westminster
- London Irish Rifles at Chelsea

In 1956 56th Division was converted into an infantry formation once more, and the brigade was reorganised as:

168 (County of London) Infantry Brigade

- 23 London Regiment
- London Scottish
- London Irish Rifles

56th Division was disbanded in 1961.

== Recipients of the Victoria Cross ==
- Private George Allan Mitchell, 1st Battalion, London Scottish (Gordon Highlanders), Second World War

== Bibliography ==
- Ian F.W. Beckett, Riflemen Form: A Study of the Rifle Volunteer Movement 1859–1908, Aldershot: Ogilby Trusts, 1982, ISBN 0 85936 271 X.
- Blaxland, Gregory (1979). Alexander's Generals (the Italian Campaign 1944-1945). London: William Kimber. ISBN 0-7183-0386-5.
- d'Este, Carlo (1991). Fatal Decision: Anzio and the Battle for Rome. New York: Harper. ISBN 0-06-015890-5.
- ]John K. Dunlop, The Development of the British Army 1899–1914, London: Methuen, 1938.
- ]D.K. Edwards, A History of the 1st Middlesex Volunteer Engineers (101 (London) Engineer Regiment, TA) 1860–1967, London, 1967.
- Hoyt, Edwin Palmer (2002). Backwater War: the Allied Campaign in Italy, 1943–1945. Greenwood Publishing Group. ISBN 978-0-275-97478-7.
- Joslen, H. F. (2003) [1960]. Orders of Battle: Second World War, 1939–1945. Uckfield, East Sussex: Naval and Military Press. ISBN 978-1-84342-474-1.
- ]H.R. Martin, Historical Record of the London Regiment, 2nd Edn (nd)
- ]R. Money Barnes, The Soldiers of London, London: Seeley Service, 1963.
- Ray Westlake, Tracing the Rifle Volunteers, Barnsley: Pen and Sword, 2010, ISBN 978-1-84884-211-3.
