= 100th Light Anti-Aircraft Regiment, Royal Artillery =

18th Battalion, Royal Fusiliers 100th Light Anti-Aircraft Regiment, RA
- Cap badge of the Royal Artillery
- Active: 21 March 1940 – 8 January 1945
- Country: United Kingdom
- Branch: British Army
- Role: Infantry; Air defence
- Size: Battalion; Regiment
- Part of: 56th (London) Infantry Division
- Engagements: Operations Vulcan and Strike; Operation Avalanche; Battle of Anzio; Operation Olive

The 100th Light Anti-Aircraft Regiment, Royal Artillery, (100th LAA Rgt) was an air defence unit of the British Army during World War II. Initially raised as an infantry battalion of the Royal Fusiliers (City of London Regiment) in 1940, it transferred to the Royal Artillery in 1941. It served with 56th (London) Infantry Division in the final stages of the Tunisian Campaign, in the landings at Salerno and subsequent fighting in Italy, including the Battle of Anzio, until it was disbanded at the beginning of 1945.

== 18th Battalion, Royal Fusiliers ==
The unit was originally formed in Devonshire on 21 March 1940 as 18th (Pioneer) Battalion, Royal Fusiliers, as part of the rapid expansion of the Army with wartime conscripts. It converted to a normal infantry battalion on 24 October that year. On 5 November 1940 the 18th Bn joined 168th (2nd London) Brigade in 56th (London) Infantry Division. This was a prewar Territorial Army (TA) motorised division serving in XII Corps in invasion-threatened East Kent, with 18th Royal Fusiliers at Lydd and Old Romney.

On 27 March 1941 the battalion transferred to a new 73rd Independent Brigade. Although Brigade Headquarters (HQ) was in South Wales, its battalions were widely dispersed across Western Command and the brigade commander was only responsible for their training. 18th Royal Fusiliers was at Pembroke. On 17 May Brigade HQ moved to Scotland to become HQ for a projected Force 109, and it ceased to command its scattered units.

== 100th Light Anti-Aircraft Regiment ==
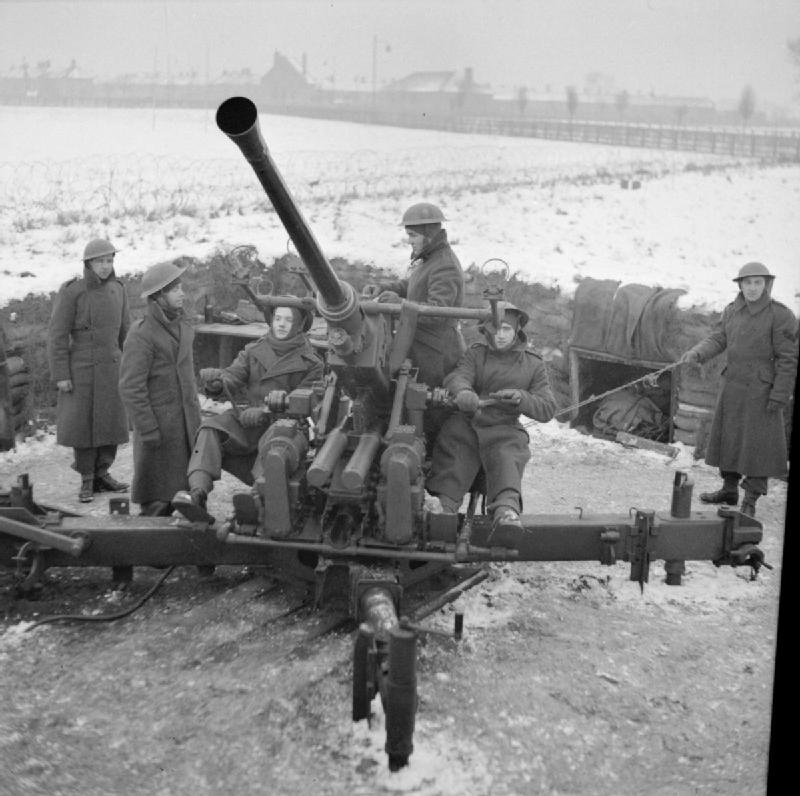
A Bofors 40 mm LAA gun crew under training, January 1942.

On 1 December 1941, while still at Pembroke, 18th Royal Fusiliers was ordered to transfer to the Royal Artillery (RA) to begin retraining in the light anti-aircraft (LAA) role/ On 30 December it became 100th LAA Regiment, consisting of Regimental HQ (RHQ) and 330, 331 and 332 LAA Batteries equipped with the Bofors 40 mm gun. After initial training, 100th LAA Rgt joined Anti-Aircraft Command in December, but left before it had been assigned to a brigade. The regiment rejoined 56th (London) Division on 3 February 1942, and remained with that formation for the rest of its existence. At the time, 56th (L) Division was in XI Corps in East Anglia. The division was now fully formed and equipped and began intensive training. In June it came under War Office control while it mobilised for overseas service.

=== Middle East and North Africa ===
56th (London) Division's formation sign featuring Dick Whittington's Cat.

During August 1942 the division moved to the embarkation ports of Liverpool and Glasgow, and sailed for the Middle East on 25 August. The fast troop convoy reached South Africa safely, but the slow convoy carrying guns and vehicles was heavily attacked by U-boats off the coast of West Africa and lost several ships. From South Africa most of the troops sailed to Bombay, then on to Basra in Iraq, arriving on 4 November and then by road and rail to Kirkuk. 56th (L) Division spent the winter of 1942–43 training for mountain warfare. Then it began an overland drive to join Eighth Army in Tunisia, travelling some 3,200 miles (5,100 km) between 18 March and 19 April.

In the Tunisian Campaign the divisional LAA was normally used to protect the field gun positions. In the rough country of Tunisia the forward LAA units were often involved in 'snap' engagements against fast, low-flying air attacks. Increasingly, they discarded the LAA No 3 Kerrison Predictor and employed the simple 'Stiffkey Stick' deflection sight for the Bofors.

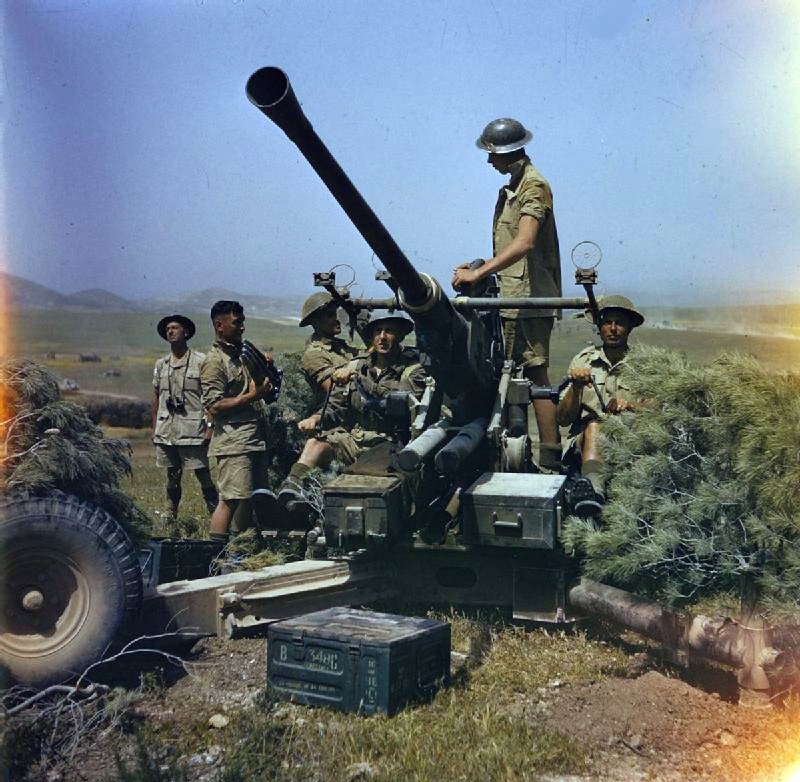
Bofors gun and crew near Tunis, May 1943.

On 23 April 56th (L) Division went into action for the first time at Enfidaville. The infantry were roughly handled and suffered heavy casualties. The final attack on Tunis (Operation Strike) began on 6 May, the division meeting strong resistance before the Germans surrendered on 12 May. By the end of the month 56th (L) Division had been pulled back to Tripoli to train for the invasion of Italy. At this stage of the war one 6-gun Troop in each LAA battery was equipped with self-propelled (SP) Bofors guns, the other two being towed.

=== Operation Avalanche ===
56th (L) Division landed as the right hand half of X Corps at Salerno before dawn on 9 September 1943 in Operation Avalanche. AA cover for the beaches was provided by Beach Groups from 12th AA Brigade, assisted by the divisional LAA units as they arrived, but they were unable to move up to defend Montecorvino Airfield as planned because it remained under fire even after 56th (L) Division secured it on 10 September. There was bitter fighting for 10 days in the beachhead and the AA units frequently found themselves in the firing line holding off German attacks that threatened to break through 56th (L) Division's front. On 22 September the Allies broke out and X Corps headed north through rough country towards Naples. 56th (L) Division continued past the city to Capua, where the Germans were making a stand on the River Volturno.

The Luftwaffe was active in trying to prevent the Allies from crossing the Volturno, particularly with Messerschmitt Bf 109 and Focke-Wulf Fw 190 single-seat fighter-bombers, and 12th AA Bde came up to reinforce the divisional LAA units along the river. 56th (L) Division's first attempt to cross using assault boats was repulsed by German artillery, but the neighbouring divisions got across. After breaching the Volturno Line X Corps made rapid progress up Highway 6 until it reached the Bernhardt Line in the mountains round Monte Camino. There was bitter fighting on Monte Camino itself that lasted until its capture on 9 December, when 56th (L) Division was rested to train for the next river crossing.

The next obstacle in front of X Corps was the lower Garigliano river south of Monte Cassino. Once again there were numerous AA engagements. 56th (L) Division's attack on the night of 17 January 1944 launched the Battle of Monte Cassino. However, fierce counter-attacks prevented X Corps from advancing far beyond the river. 56th (L) Division was about to resume the offensive on the Garigliano on 30 January when it was hurriedly withdrawn to reinforce the landing further up the coast at Anzio, which had run into trouble.

=== Anzio ===
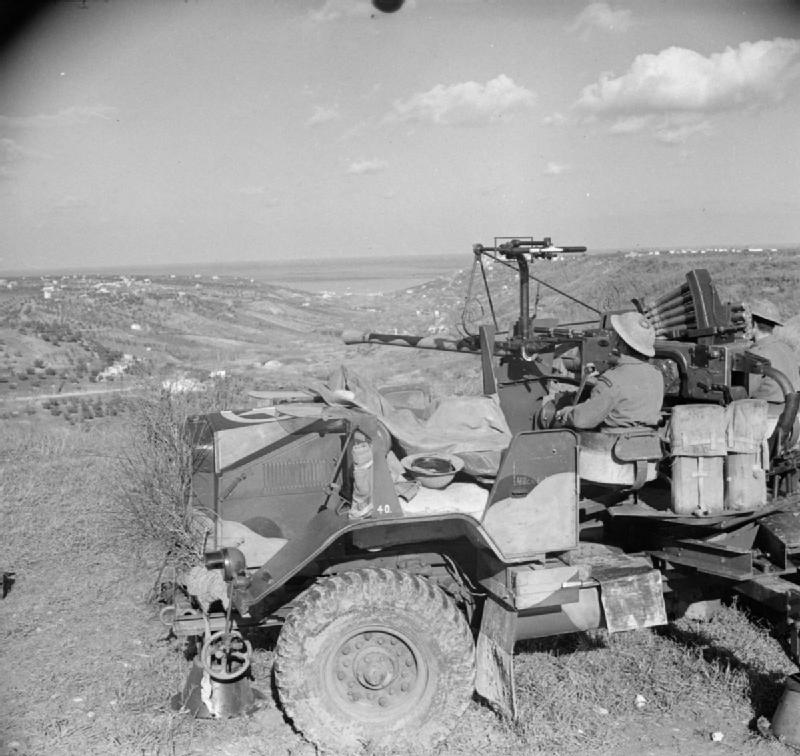
Self-propelled (SP) Bofors gun in Italy, January 1944.

1st Division had made the initial landing at Anzio alongside US troops in Operation Shingle on 21 January. Its 90th LAA Rgt landed a SP Bofors battery with the first wave and the whole regiment was ashore by D + 5 to defend the field artillery positions. At first all went well, but the commander of the operation waited too long to build up his forces and lost the initiative. The Germans quickly contained the beachhead and by 1 February were driving the Allied troops back towards the sea, and sending over waves of air attacks. 168 LAA Battery from 56th (East Lancashire) LAA Rgt landed on 5 February, and the first of 100th LAA Rgt's arrived on 14 February as 56th (L) Division arrived in the beachhead. The five LAA batteries, coordinated by the commanding officer (CO) of 90th LAA Rgt, had to cover the spread of six British field artillery regiments, which were unable to disperse or find cover in the congested beachhead.

Most of the AA effort at Anzio was controlled by 35th US AA Artillery Brigade, but the radar of its single mobile operations room was having trouble giving early warning of attacks by low-flying Me 109 and Fw 190 fighter-bombers. The CO of 90th LAA Rgt asked for help and got some mobile No 4 Mark III lightweight local warning radar sets from 22nd AA Bde back at Salerno. All the British LAA batteries prepared concentrations of fire within their sectors, for use by day or night to cover the front. The guns fired on fixed bearings at an elevation of 35 degrees, employing 12-second long-burning Tracer ammunition: 'this produced a curtain of bursts at about 8,000 feet (2,400 m) with sheets of tracer behind it'. These concentrations could be ordered by the gun operations room, by radio, or by a 'master gun' on watch in each Troop. By 19 February the other two batteries of 100th LAA Rgt arrived to extend the fire plan, with 331 LAA Bty stationed aboard Landing Ship, Tank, vessels moored in Anzio harbour.

In the flat, open country of the beachhead, the LAA positions were dangerously conspicuous and were frequently shelled and mortared, and casualties were numerous, while the grim fighting along the front often drew in the LAA Troops to give fire support to the infantry. Targets included German infantry working their way up dry river beds into the Allied positions, enemy forming-up areas, buildings containing machine-guns, and enemy positions along railway embarkments, The LAA batteries used the observation posts (OPs) of the field artillery or set up their own. The infantry of 56th (L) Division were continually engaged in Trench warfare, and by 25 February were down to less than half strength. 100th LAA Regiment itself had lost 8 men killed and 17 wounded, but had scored four Category 1 'kills'. On 9 March the exhausted division began to be evacuated from Anzio to Naples.

=== Gothic Line ===
56th Division was now went back to Egypt for rest. On arrival at Port Said it went into camp, leave was granted, and training resumed. On 10 July the refitted division left Port Said to return to Taranto, from where it was sent to join V Corps with Eighth Army on the Adriatic coast of Italy.

Massive preparations were required for Eighth Army's assault on the Gothic Line (Operation Olive). V Corps opened the attack on 25 August, and by 1 September the Gothic Line had been cracked open, but 56th (L) Division coming up from reserve still had hard fighting at Monte Capello, Montefiore Conca village and the Gemmano ridge. It finally took Gemmano village on 9 September. After a short rest, the division advanced on 16 September and fought its way to the swollen Fiumicino river by the beginning of October. On 7 October the exhausted division was withdrawn.

=== Disbandment ===
By late 1944 the Luftwaffe was suffering from such shortages of pilots, aircraft and fuel that serious air attacks were rare. At the same time British forces in Italy were suffering an acute manpower shortage. As early as June 1944 the Chiefs of Staff had decided that the number of AA regiments in Italy must be reduced and their fit personnel converted to other roles, particularly infantry. 100th LAA Regiment was one of those selected for disbandment: it was withdrawn from 56th (L) Division on 9 November.

100th Light Anti-Aircraft Regiment was formally disbanded on 8 January 1945. Many of the men would have been sent to the Infantry Reinforcement Training Depot. In the case of retrained AA gunners, care was taken to post them to infantry battalions from their home areas, and there were a number of London battalions in the Mediterranean theatre.
