= George Allan Mitchell =

- Born: 30 August 1911; Highgate, London
- Died: 24 January 1944 (aged 32); Monte Cassino, Italy
- Burial place: Minturno War Cemetery
- Military career
- Allegiance: United Kingdom
- Branch: British Army
- Rank: Private
- Service number: 3252325
- Units: London Scottish
- Conflicts: Second World War: Italian Campaign; Battle of Monte Cassino †
- Awards: Victoria Cross

Private George Allan Mitchell VC (30 August 1911 – 24 January 1944) was an English recipient of the Victoria Cross, the highest and most prestigious award for gallantry in the face of the enemy that can be awarded to British and Commonwealth forces.

== Details ==
George Allan Mitchell was born on 30 August 1911 in Highgate, north London. He attended Farmer Lane Boys' School in Leyton, at that time in Essex, but now in the London Borough of Waltham Forest in east London. He was also active in Scouting in Leyton.

Mitchell was 32 years old, and a private in the British Army during the Second World War whilst serving with the 1st Battalion, London Scottish (Gordon Highlanders), during the Battle of Monte Damiano (part of the First Battle of Monte Cassino) in the Italian campaign when he earned the VC.

His citation in the London Gazette reads:

In Italy on the night of 23rd and 24th January, 1944, a Company of the London Scottish was ordered to carry out a local attack to restore the situation on a portion of the main Damiano ridge.

The Company attacked with two platoons forward and a composite platoon of London Scottish and Royal Berkshires in reserve. The Company Commander was wounded in the very early stages of the attack. The only other officer with the Company was wounded soon afterwards.

A section of this Company was ordered by the Platoon Commander to carry out a right flanking movement against some enemy machine guns which were holding up the advance. Almost as soon as he had issued the order, he was killed. There was no Platoon Sergeant. The section itself consisted of a Lance-Corporal and three men, who were shortly joined by Private Mitchell, the 2-inch mortarmen from Platoon Headquarters and another private.

During the advance, the enemy opened heavy machine gun fire at point blank range. Without hesitation, Private Mitchell dropped the 2-inch mortar which he was carrying, and seizing a rifle and bayonet, charged, alone, up the hill through intense Spandau fire. He reached the enemy machine gun unscathed, jumped into the weapon pit, shot one and bayonetted the other member of the crew, thus silencing the gun. As a result, the advance of the platoon continued, but shortly afterwards the leading section was again held up by the fire of approximately two German sections who were strongly entrenched. Private Mitchell, realising that prompt action was essential, rushed forward into the assault firing his rifle from his hip, completely oblivious of the bullets which were sweeping the area. The remainder of his section followed him and arrived in time to complete the capture of the position in which six Germans were killed and twelve made prisoner.

As the section was reorganising, another enemy machine gun opened up on it at close range. Once more Private Mitchell rushed forward alone and with his rifle and bayonet killed the crew.

The section now found itself immediately below the crest of the hill from which heavy small arms fire was being directed and grenades were being thrown. Private Mitchell's ammunition was exhausted, but in spite of this he called on the men for one further effort and again led the assault up the steep and rocky hillside. Dashing to the front, he was again the first man to reach the enemy position and was mainly instrumental in forcing the remainder of the enemy to surrender.

A few minutes later, a German who had surrendered, picked up a rifle and shot Private Mitchell through the head.

Throughout this operation, carried out on a very dark night, up a steep hillside covered in rocks and scrub, Private Mitchell displayed courage and devotion to duty of the very highest order. His complete disregard of the enemy fire, the fearless way in which he continually exposed himself, and his refusal to accept defeat, so inspired his comrades, that together they succeeded in overcoming and defeating an enemy superior in numbers, and helped by all the advantages of the ground.

== The medal ==
The Victoria Cross was presented to Mitchell's family By King George VI in an investiture ceremony at Buckingham Palace on 17 July 1945. In 1949, his brother placed Mitchell's medal group in the care of Farmer Road School, which was renamed George Mitchell School in his honour in 1959. In 2006, in an agreement organised by Mitchell's nephew, the medals were moved to the London Scottish Regimental Museum in Horseferry Road, London, The museum purchased the medals from the school for £150,000, which went towards the cost of a mobile classroom.

== Bibliography ==
- John, Laffin (1997). British VCs of World War 2: A Study in Heroism. Sutton Publishing. ISBN 0-7509-1026-7.
