= 115th Light Anti-Aircraft Regiment, Royal Artillery =

8th Battalion, East Yorkshire Regiment 115th Light Anti-Aircraft Regiment, RA
- Cap badge of the Royal Artillery
- Active: May 1940–8 January 1945
- Country: United Kingdom
- Branch: British Army
- Role: Air defence
- Size: Regiment
- Part of: 46th Division
- Engagements: Tunisian Campaign; Operation Avalanche; Volturno crossing; Battle of Gemmano

The 115th Light Anti-Aircraft Regiment, Royal Artillery (115th LAA Rgt) was an air defence unit of the British Army during World War II. Initially raised as an infantry battalion of the East Yorkshire Regiment, it transferred to the Royal Artillery in 1942. It served as the LAA component of the 46th Division in the Tunisian Campaign, at the Salerno landings, and through the Italian Campaign until it was disbanded in 1945.

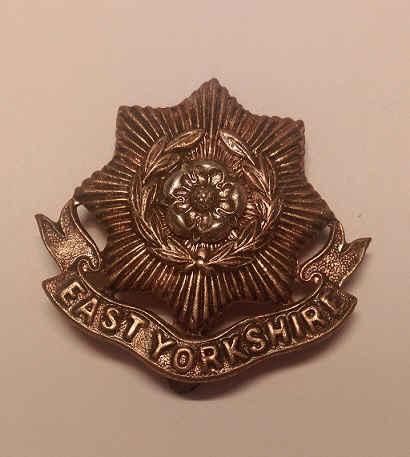
Cap badge of the East Yorkshire Regiment.

== 8th Battalion, East Yorkshire Regiment ==
The unit was originally formed in May 1940 as the 50th (Holding) Battalion, East Yorkshire Regiment, as part of the rapid expansion of the Army with wartime conscripts. On 9 October 1940, it was redesignated 8th Battalion, East Yorkshire Regiment and it joined the 217th Independent Infantry Brigade (Home) when that was formed on 20 October 1940.

'Home' brigades had a purely static coast defence role. The 217th served in Northumbrian Area, then from 12 March 194, it became part of the Durham and North Riding County Division, deployed around Teesside. During 1941, the battalions progressively left the brigade, mainly to be converted to other roles such as armour or light anti-aircraft (LAA). The 8th East Yorkshires was the last remaining unit in the brigade when it left on 24 November 1941. The battalion then briefly served with the 224th Independent Infantry Brigade (Home) until 15 December 1941.

== Anti-Aircraft conversion ==
The battalion was officially transferred to the Royal Artillery (RA) on 1 January 1942 as the 115th LAA Regiment, with 377, 378, and 379 LAA Batteries. The regiment was re-badged as RA and carried out its LAA training on Bofors guns at Saighton Camp, near Chester. It then moved to Kent, with Regimental Headquarters (RHQ) at Eastwell Park, near Ashford. Anti-Aircraft Command was responsible for AA defence of the UK, and the 115th LAA Regiment was initially included in its order of battle, but it was deleted on 23 February 1942, and joined the 46th Division the following day.

46th Division's formation sign

The 46th Division was a 'Second Line' formation of the Territorial Army (TA) formed just before the outbreak of war. Its virtually untrained infantry had briefly served in the Battle of France before being evacuated from Dunkirk. Lessons from that campaign and the early fighting in the Western Desert had been learned, and now every infantry division was to have its own air defence unit, equipped with 48 (later 54) towed Bofors 40 mm guns to protect against ground-attack aircraft such as the Luftwaffe 's feared Stuka. The plan was to equip one battery in each divisional LAA regiment with self-propelled guns on truck chassis, but few of these were available until later in the war.

When the 115th LAA Rgt joined, the division was training with the XII Corps in South East, England. However, in August 1942, it was transferred to First Army, which was preparing for the Allied landings in North Africa (Operation Torch).

== Tunisia ==
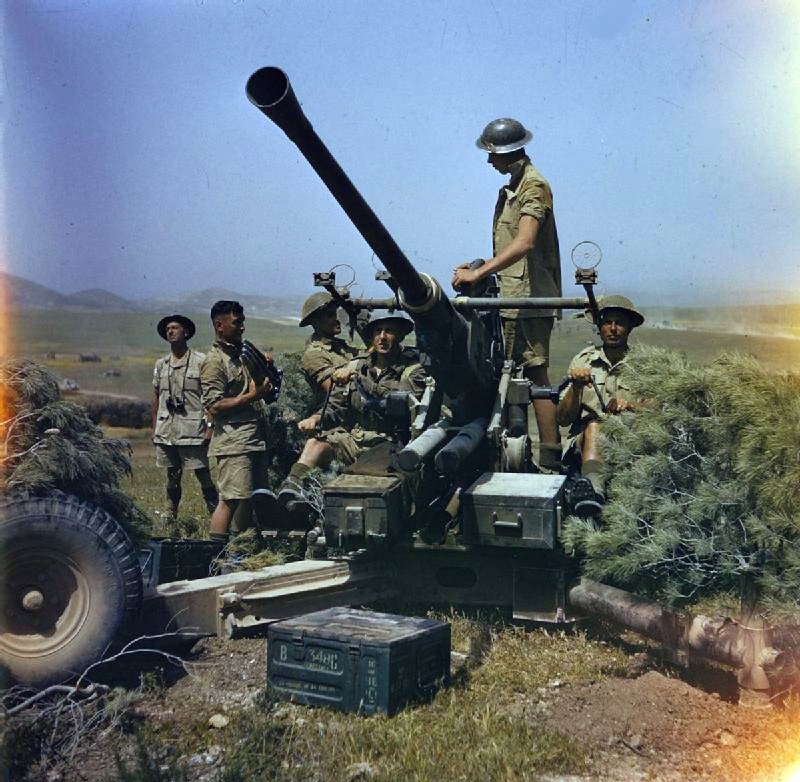
Bofors gun and crew in action near Tunis, May 1943.

The Torch landings began on 8 November 1942, and First Army's units and formations were progressively fed into the fighting. The 46th Division's 139th Brigade sailed on 24 December, accompanied by 379 LAA Bty; the rest of the division embarked on 6 January 1943 and landed on 17 January, by which time the focus of the campaign was in Tunisia. By midnight on 13/14 February, the division was in the line, holding the sector nearest the coast. During the hurried reorganisation caused by the Battle of Kasserine Pass, the division's brigades were split up, each with attached artillery units. When the Axis launched Operation Ochsenkopf on 26 February, the main weight fell on 139th Bde on the coast, which was forced back from a number of positions over the next month. Harder fighting came against the 128th Bde in the Hunt's Gap area. The division counter-attacked on 29 March, and had regained all its positions by 1 April.

Moving and deploying AA guns in the rough country with underpowered gun tractors was difficult but necessary as units in the forward areas were subjected to regular dive-bombing and ground attacks. Ammunition expenditure by the LAA batteries was high, and supply was sometimes erratic. With greater experience of 'snap' actions against fast, low-flying aircraft, Bofors gun units increasingly abandoned using the Kerrison Predictor in favour of the simple 'Stiffkey Stick' deflection sight.

After the Eighth Army's victory at Wadi Akarit, 128th Bde was part of the force sent by the First Army to cut the retreat of the Axis forces, even though Army HQ did not consider it completely ready for battle. As a preliminary to the main attack on the Fondouk Pass, it was tasked with capturing and holding crossings over Wadi Marguellil and then the high ground beyond, which it successfully achieved on 7/8 April. The First Army began its final offensive on Tunis (Operation Vulcan) on 22 April. 46th Division attacked with strong artillery and tank support towards some hills near Sebkret el Kourzia in an effort to crack open the position for the armour to pass through. In the event, the armoured formations had to fight hard for five days before they could get through. Axis air attacks were maintained until 25 April, doing considerable damage, but tailed off thereafter.

By early May, the Axis forces were crumbling, and a final thrust (Operation Strike) took the First Army into Tunis on 7 May; the Axis forces surrendered on 13 May. At the end of the campaign, the 115th LAA Rgt claimed 58 enemy aircraft destroyed for the expenditure of 22,748 rounds (some of the rounds fired would have been against ground targets).

== Italy ==
=== Salerno ===
The 46th Division was assigned to Force 141 (later the 15th Army Group) for the Allied invasion of Sicily but was not employed. Instead, it was used to carry out the assault landing at Salerno on the Italian mainland (Operation Avalanche) on 9 September. The division concentrated at Bizerte from its training areas in mid-August. (Note: Among the AA defences planned for the beachheads were smokescreens. There was an air raid alert while 46th Division carried out a practice landing at Bizerte and the smokescreen was activated. A low-flying German fighter flew through the screen firing at random, and seriously wounded the corps commander, Lt-Gen Brian Horrocks. The smoke screen did, however, protect 46th Division's convoy when it was bombed while lying at anchor in Bizerte Bay on the night of 6/7 September.) The division was to land a brigade on beaches at the northern (left-hand) end of the landing area. The beaches would be secured by specialist 'Beach Bricks', including heavy and light AA batteries, and the infantry division's own LAA batteries would then assist with beach defence as they arrived, paying particular attention to exit routes and assembly areas. In the 46th Division's sector, this worked reasonably well: although the invasion convoy was bombed during the preceding night and the leading infantry and Beach Brick troops landed under shellfire and into immediate firefights, the AA guns got ashore and long-range P-38 Lightning fighters kept off most Luftwaffe air attacks by day. By 23.00, the 46th Division was landing in waves, and no counter-attack had yet developed. However, a week-long battle for Salerno and its hinterland developed, with more and more reinforcements squeezing onto the beaches and the Luftwaffe concentrating its attacks on the beaches and shipping. Finally, on 16 September, the Germans withdrew and 46th Division swung northwards towards Naples.

=== Naples to the Garigliano ===
The 46th Division fought its way through the high ground north of Salerno, and then the armour drove across the Plain of Naples to the city itself on 1 October. Next the force moved up for the assault crossing of the Volturno. The division's attack on the night of 12/13 October was almost unopposed except in one sector, and it had two brigade bridgeheads by nightfall on 13 October. However, this was partly because the Germans had chosen to defend the wide marshy area across the river, and meanwhile their aircraft were very active in attempting to deny the other crossings and disrupt the bridging operations, with frequent attacks using Messerschmitt Bf 109 and Focke-Wulf Fw 190 Fighter-bombers.

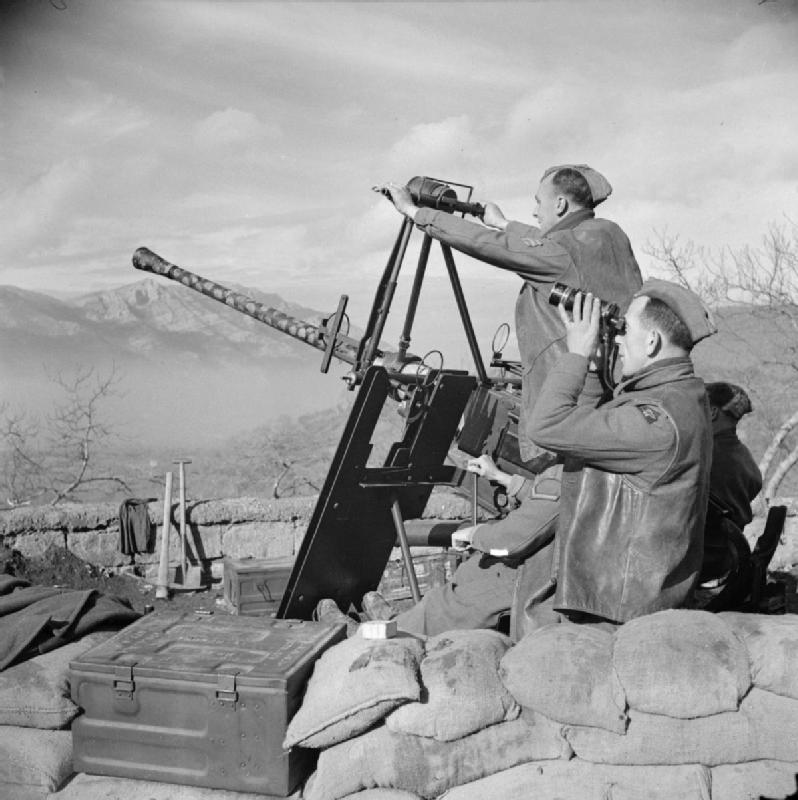
Bofors gun of 379 Bty, 115 LAA Rgt, in Italy, 7 January 1944.

After the Volturno, the Luftwaffe was rarely seen, and AA engagements became uncommon as the 46th Division worked its way up the coastal plain past Monte Camino to the German Winter Line. The division's next major operation was a failed assault crossing of the Garigliano on the night of 19/20 January 1944, intended to assist II US Corps crossing of the Rapido (part of the attacks on Monte Cassino). Afterwards, the division was involved in hill fighting between 26 January and 9 February, taking Monte Furlito and Monte Purgatorio but failing at Monte Faito. The attacks were then called off in rain, sleet, and snow.

=== Rest and retraining ===
In early 1944, Allied Armies in Italy (AAI) instituted the procedure of shipping exhausted British formations (without their equipment) to Middle East Command for rest and retraining. The first of these was the 46th Division, which embarked on 16 March, arrived in Egypt on 22 March, and moved up into Palestine at the end of the month. Rested and reinforced, the division retraced its journey in June, landing back in Italy on 3 July and taking over the 5th Division's guns and vehicles. However, because of AAI's increasing manpower shortage, many of the infantry reinforcements were former AA gunners who had been redeployed. Even divisional LAA units like the 115th LAA Rgt had to give up one troop per battery, reducing the number of guns from 54 to 36 guns. This was made possible by the near total air supremacy now enjoyed by the Allies in Italy. Meanwhile, the lack of AA targets meant that the Bofors guns could be used for other purposes. They were incorporated into ground defence fireplans and were also used to harass known enemy machine guns or mortar posts or to engage buildings and bunkers. A useful role was to fire on fixed lines to mark boundaries in an advance, with the troops being able to watch the lines of tracer. Some infantry commanders requested their LAA units to 'brown' an area from which an attack seemed imminent.

=== Gothic Line ===
On its return, the 46th Division joined the Eighth Army on the east side of Italy to take part in breaching the Gothic Line (Operation Olive). The initial operations starting on 26 August began well, with the 46th Division taking the Montegridolfo village complex on 31 August and then continuing its advance to the Conca and Morciano. It then moved to clear the Croce–Gemmano high ground to protect the Eighth Army's flank as it advanced on Coriano, but here the division ran into stiff opposition in the Battle of Gemmano. Only on 17 September were the Germans cleared out of their defences and the Eighth Army able to close up to the next line of defences, the Rimini Line. This was taken in a rush by 21 September.

The Eighth Army continued its advance, struggling as much with bad weather and swollen rivers as with stubborn enemy opposition. The 46th Division was now due for a rest, having been in almost continuous operations for two months, and it was relieved in mid-October, though it was back in the line on 31 October.

== Disbandment ==
By now, the continuing manpower crisis and the near-total absence of the Luftwaffe meant that deeper cuts were made in AA provision. In November 1944, the British infantry divisions in Italy lost their LAA regiments, with 115th LAA Rgt leaving 46th Division on 8 November. It was then disbanded on 8 January 1945 and its personnel were drafted to other roles. (Note: A new 115 LAA Rgt was reformed in April 1947 from the war-raised personnel of 129th (First Surrey Rifles) LAA Rgt (TA), but this only lasted a month before it was disbanded.)
