= 90th Light Anti-Aircraft Regiment, Royal Artillery =

7th Battalion, South Wales Borderers 90th Light Anti-Aircraft Regiment, RA
- Cap badge of the Royal Artillery
- Active: May 1940–8 January 1945
- Country: United Kingdom
- Branch: British Army
- Role: Infantry; Air defence
- Size: Battalion; Regiment
- Part of: 1st Infantry Division
- Engagements: Operation Vulcan; Operation Strike; Operation Shingle; Operation Olive

The 90th Light Anti-Aircraft Regiment, Royal Artillery, (90th LAA Rgt) was an air defence unit of the British Army during World War II. Initially raised as an infantry battalion of the South Wales Borderers in 1940, it transferred to the Royal Artillery in 1941. It served with 1st Infantry Division in the final stages of the Tunisian Campaign, distinguished itself in the Anzio landings and subsequent fighting, and continued serving in Italy before being disbanded at the beginning of 1945.

== 7th Battalion, South Wales Borderers ==
The unit was originally formed in May 1940 as 50th Holding Battalion, South Wales Borderers, as part of the rapid expansion of the Army with wartime conscripts. It converted to a normal infantry battalion on 9 October that year as 7th Battalion, South Wales Borderers.

On 10 October it joined 224th Independent Infantry Brigade (Home) which was being organised in South Wales. From 19 February 1941 the brigade was temporarily attached to 59th (Staffordshire) Infantry Division, at that time serving in X Corps in the invasion-threatened south-east corner of Kent. On 12 March it joined the Durham and North Riding County Division when that static defence formation was formed along the coast of North East England.

== 90th Light Anti-Aircraft Regiment ==
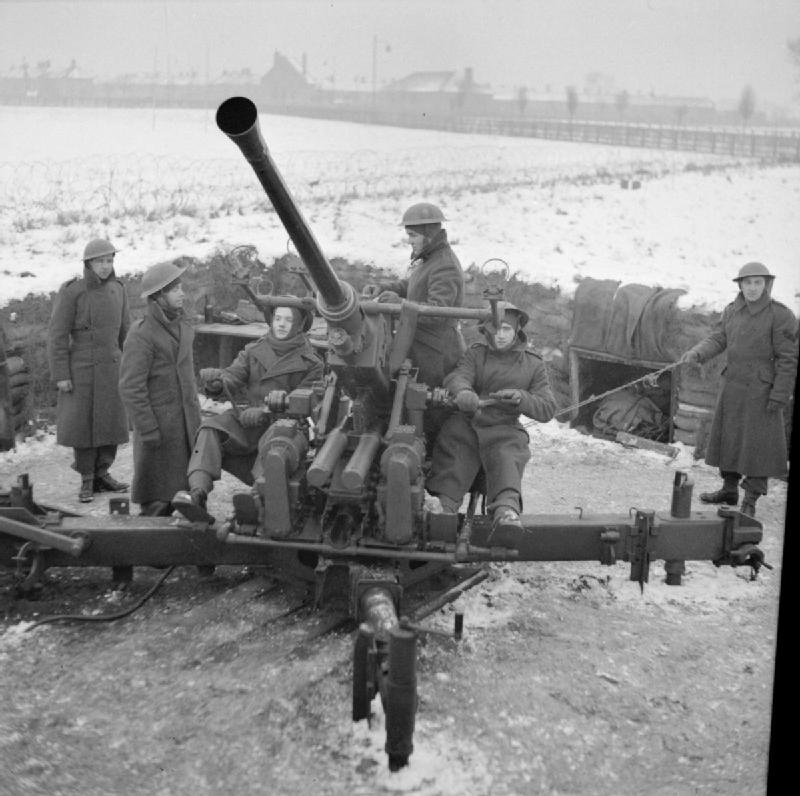
A Bofors 40 mm LAA gun crew under training, January 1942.

7th South Wales Borderers left 224th Bde on 15 November 1941 and transferred to the Royal Artillery (RA) to begin retraining in the light anti-aircraft (LAA) role, becoming 90th LAA Regiment with Regimental Headquarters (RHQ) and 311, 312 and 313 LAA Batteries. Surplus men were drafted on 26 November to 211th Heavy AA Training Regiment at Oswestry where they joined a new 493 (Mixed) Heavy AA Bty that was being formed for 141st (Mixed) HAA Rgt ('Mixed' indicating that women from the Auxiliary Territorial Service were integrated into the unit's personnel).

1st Division's formation sign.

After initial training, 90th LAA Rgt joined Anti-Aircraft Command in December, but left before it had been assigned to a brigade. The regiment joined 1st Infantry Division on 27 January 1942, and remained with that formation for the rest of its existence. At the time, 1st Division was in II Corps District in East Anglia.

In October the division was transferred to I Corps (known as Force 152 at the time). On 6 February 1943 it came under direct War Office control preparatory to going on overseas service, and on 28 February it sailed for North Africa.

=== Tunisia ===
1st Division landed between 5 and 9 March, and between 3 and 6 April it joined First Army fighting in Tunisia. It went into the line as part of V Corps facing Longstop Hill, which had proved unassailable as far back as 22 December. Much of the divisional LAA was used to protect the field gun positions. In the rough country of Tunisia the forward LAA units were often involved in 'snap' engagements against fast, low-flying air attacks. Increasingly, they discarded the LAA No 3 Kerrison Predictor and employed the simple 'Stiffkey Stick' deflection sight for the Bofors.

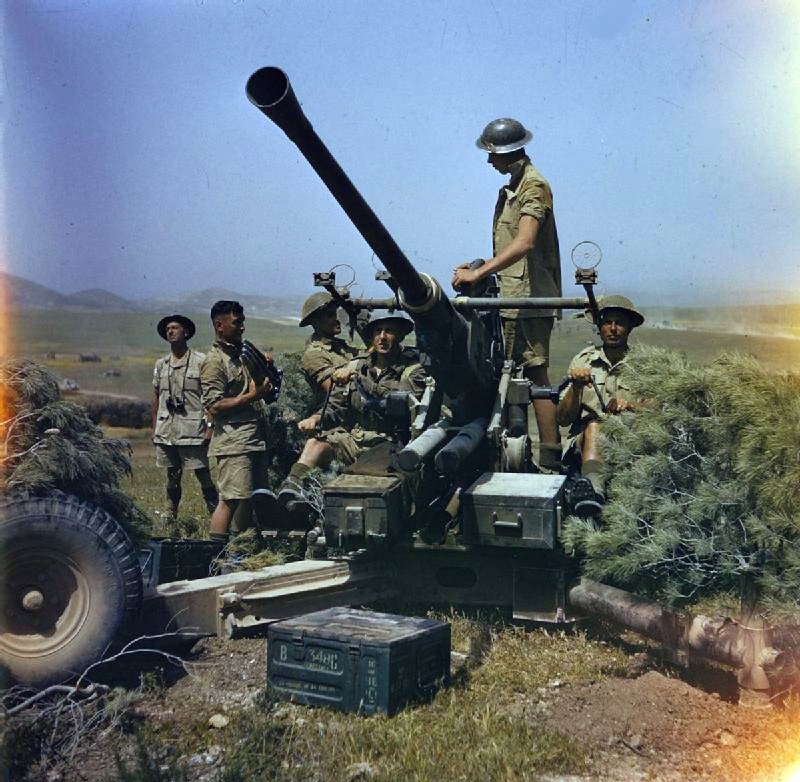
Bofors gun and crew near Tunis, May 1943.

First Army was preparing for its final assault on Tunis (Operation Vulcan), but early on the morning of 21 April the Germans launched a spoiling attack against 1st Division's 3rd Brigade on 'Banana Ridge', which posed some danger to the artillery that was assembling well forward for the forthcoming attack. The spoiling attack was driven off after some stiff fighting. On 23 April 1st Division launched its attack against a line of low hills, with considerable artillery support, but found the captured ground too hard to dig in, and was thrown back by counter-attacks. The ridge was taken again next day and securely held, at the cost of high casualties. The division had some sharp actions over the succeeding days but by 5 May it was in place for Operation Strike. That evening it took Djebel Bou Aoukaz with massive artillery support, securing the flank for First Army's main attack early next morning. British troops entered Tunis next day, and the Axis forces in Tunisia surrendered on 12 May.

As a prelude to the Allied invasion of Sicily, 1st Division was landed on Pantelleria on 11 June in Operation Corkscrew. Pantelleria was rumoured to be an island fortress, but after massive air and naval bombardment, the garrison surrendered without any land fighting. There were some subsequent air attacks from Sicily, but a number of British AA units had been landed with radar to defend the captured island, and 1st Division was soon back in North Africa.

=== Italy ===
The division sailed again on 4 December, landing on mainland Italy next day to enter the Italian Campaign. Initially it joined British Eighth Army but was soon shifted west to reinforce the Fifth US Army for the Allied assault landing at Anzio (Operation Shingle). The division concentrated at Pompeii, Nola and Salerno under strict secrecy between 1 and 5 January 1944.

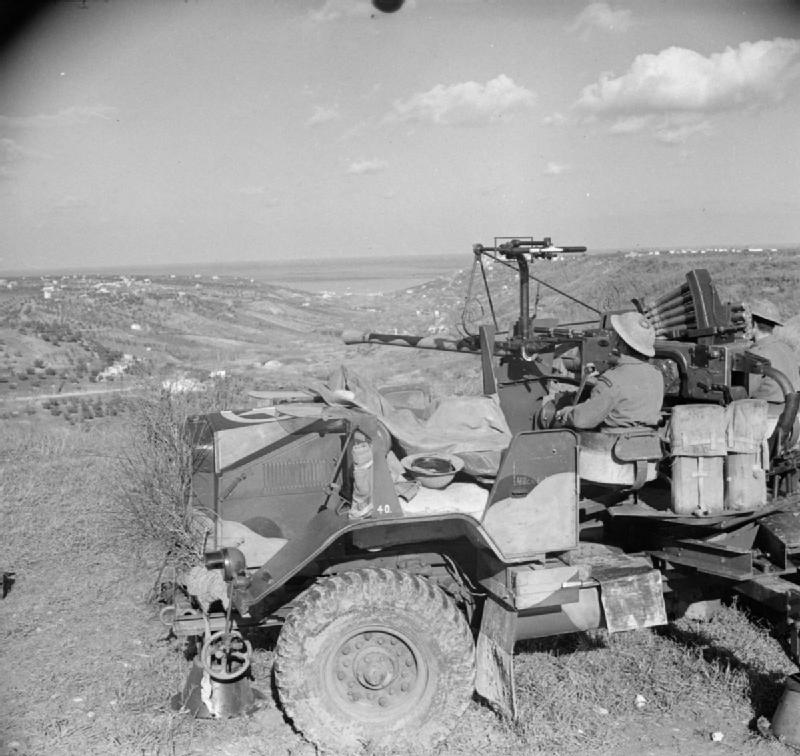
Self-propelled (SP) Bofors gun in Italy, January 1944.

At this stage of the war one 6-gun Troop in each LAA battery was equipped with self-propelled (SP) Bofors guns, the other two being towed. However, for this landing 90th LAA Rgt concentrated all 18 of its SP Bofors in 312 LAA Bty to land with the first wave on 'Peter' Beach on 21 January 1944. Apart from the SP guns, only Jeeps and ammunition trucks could be taken. 311 LAA Battery with towed Bofors landed next day (D + 1) and the two batteries, having lost one gun, moved inland to defend the field artillery positions. At first all went well, but the commander of the operation waited too long to build up his forces and lost the initiative. The Germans quickly contained the beachhead and by 1 February were attempting to drive the Allied troops back towards the sea, and sending over waves of air attacks. 313 LAA Battery had been landed on D + 5, and two other LAA batteries (168 Bty from 56th (East Lancashire) LAA Rgt and one from 100th LAA Rgt) also arrived, but the five batteries had to cover the spread of six field artillery regiments, which were unable to disperse or find cover in the congested beachhead.

Most of the AA effort at Anzio was controlled by 35th US AA Artillery Brigade, but the radar of its single mobile operations room was having trouble giving early warning of attacks by low-flying Messerschmitt Bf 109 and Focke-Wulf Fw 190 single-seat fighter-bombers. 90th LAA Regiment's commanding officer, Lieutenant-Colonel E.S. Turner, tasked with coordinating the AA cover of the British sector, asked for help and got some mobile No 4 Mark III lightweight local warning radar sets sent from 22nd AA Bde back at Salerno. All his batteries prepared concentrations of fire within their sectors, for use by day or night to cover the front. The guns fired on fixed bearings at an elevation of 35 degrees, employing 12-second long-burning Tracer ammunition: 'this produced a curtain of bursts at about 8,000 feet (2,400 m) with sheets of tracer behind it'. These concentrations could be ordered by the gun operations room, by radio, or by a 'master gun' on watch in each troop. By 19 February Turner was reinforced by the other two batteries of 100th LAA Rgt to extend the fire plan, one of which was stationed aboard Landing Ship, Tank, vessels moored in Anzio harbour.

In the flat, open country of the beachhead, the LAA positions were dangerously conspicuous and were frequently shelled and mortared. During February 90th LAA Rgt lost 17 men killed and 53 wounded. Although the battered infantry of 1st Division were rotated, 90th LAA remained in action. Raids continued all through March, in strengths varying from single aircraft to 20-plus, while the grim fighting along the front often drew in the LAA troops to give fire support to the infantry. 35th AAA Brigade claimed that by 25 March the number of aircraft shot down by all AA units at Anzio amounted to 141. Although the tempo of air attacks declined in April, the calls for support from the infantry engaged in Trench warfare were endless. On 21 April alone, 90th LAA Rgt fired 3425 rounds against German infantry working their way up dry river beds into the Allied positions. Other targets included enemy forming-up areas, buildings containing machine-guns, and enemy positions along railway embarkments, The LAA batteries used the observation posts (OPs) of the field artillery or set up their own. 312 LAA Battery alone fired over 12,000 rounds against such targets. 90th LAA Regiment receives special praise from the Royal Artillery historian for remaining in action from the first day to the last of the Anzio campaign. Its AA score in four months of action was 113 Category 1 'kills', of which only seven were due to concentrations, the remainder to individual shooting. Luftwaffe casualties were so heavy that it stopped daylight raids over the beachhead in May and concentrated on night bombing of the port and beaches, which were protected by the heavy AA guns of 35th AAA Bde.

When the Allies broke out of the Anzio beachhead on 23 May, the exhausted 1st Division was left as a holding unit under Fifth US Army. By 3 June it was pushing forward again as a flank guard as Fifth Army drove on. It met some resistance but reached the River Tiber on 5 June, the day after Rome fell. It then left for rest and refit in Army Group Reserve.

1st Division returned to the front line under XIII Corps near Florence on 8/9 August. It. crossed the River Arno on 21 August as a preliminary to Operation Olive to break the Germans' Gothic Line. In early September the division was following the retreating Germans and by 15 September it was approaching the Casaglia Pass. The Luftwaffe rarely appeared. However, by mid-October the offensive had begun to lose impetus in the Apennine Mountains as the Allied supply lines were stretched and the difficulty of finding suitable gun positions increased. 1st Division was exhausted and could not continue to attack in the winter conditions. The offensive was closed down on 26 October.

=== Disbandment ===
By late 1944 the Luftwaffe was suffering from such shortages of pilots, aircraft and fuel that serious air attacks were rare. At the same time British forces in Italy were suffering an acute manpower shortage. As early as June 1944 the Chiefs of Staff had decided that the number of AA regiments in Italy must be reduced and their fit personnel converted to other roles, particularly infantry. 90th LAA Regiment was one of those selected for disbandment: it was withdrawn from the front on 7 November and replaced in 1st Division by 11th (City of London Yeomanry) LAA Rgt. (11th (CoLY) LAA Regiment only deployed one Bofors battery in AA defence of bridges while the rest of the regiment served in a variety of support roles.)

90th Light Anti-Aircraft Regiment was formally disbanded on 8 January 1945. Many of the men would have been sent to the Infantry Reinforcement Training Depot. In the case of retrained AA gunners, care was taken to post them to infantry battalions from their home areas, though there were few Welsh battalions in the Mediterranean theatre.
