= 117th Light Anti-Aircraft Regiment, Royal Artillery =

8th Battalion, Royal Ulster Rifles 117th Light Anti-Aircraft Regiment, RA
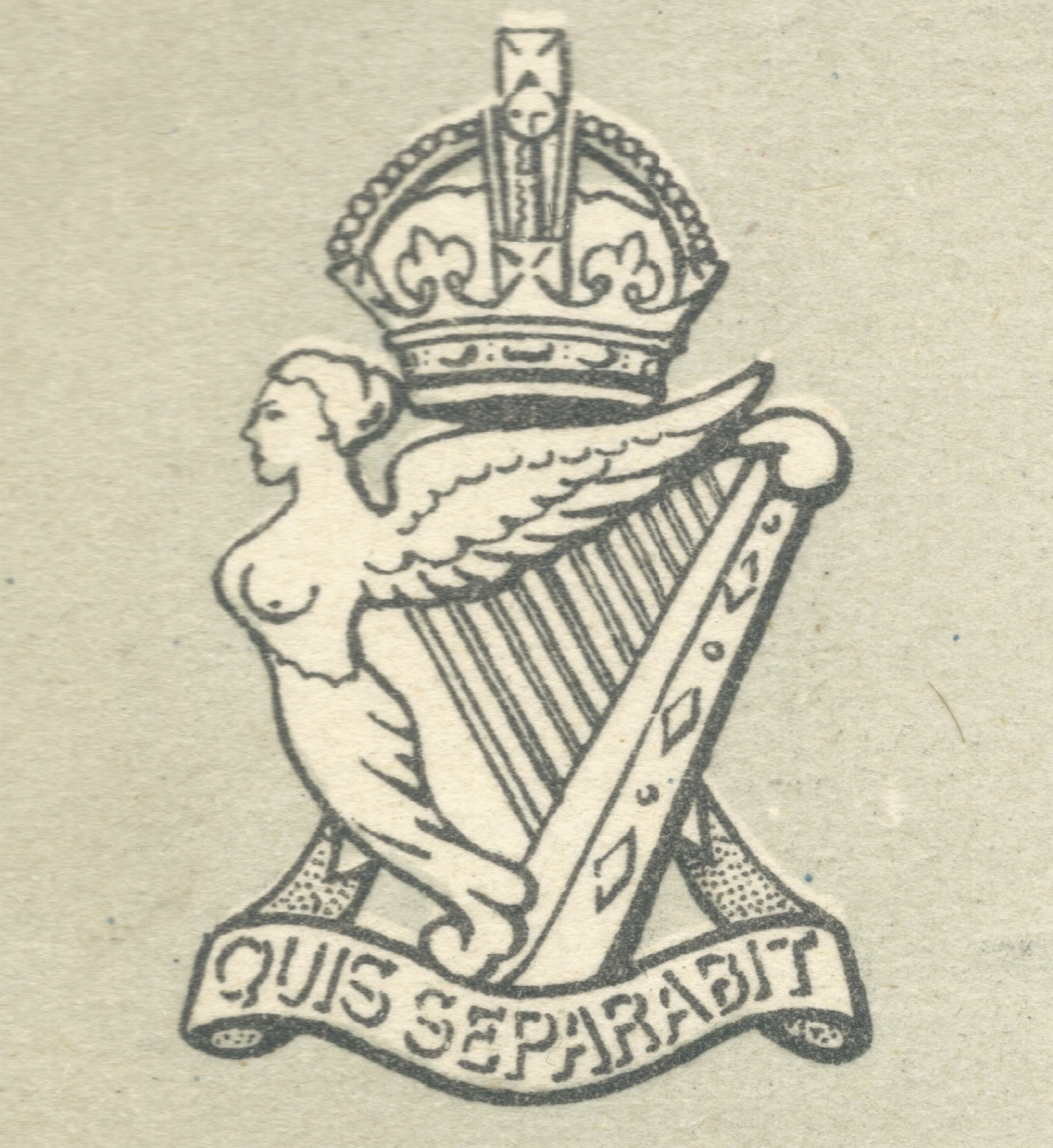
- Cap badge of the Royal Ulster Rifles
- Active: 28 May 1940 – 15 June 1944
- Country: United Kingdom
- Branch: British Army
- Role: Infantry; Air defence
- Size: Battalion; Regiment
- Part of: IX Corps; 73rd AA Brigade; 62nd AA Brigade
- Engagements: Tunisian campaign; Allied invasion of Sicily; Italian campaign

The 117th Light Anti-Aircraft Regiment, Royal Artillery, (117th LAA Rgt) was an air defence unit of the British Army during World War II. Initially raised as an infantry battalion of the Royal Ulster Rifles (RUR) in 1940, it transferred to the Royal Artillery in 1942. It served in Tunisia, Malta, Sicily and Italy (including the notorious Air raid on Bari) before being broken up in 1944 and the gunners converted back into infantrymen.

== 8th Battalion, Royal Ulster Rifles ==
The unit was originally formed on 28 May 1940 as 50th Holding Battalion, Royal Ulster Rifles, as part of the rapid expansion of the Army with wartime conscripts. In its first three weeks it inducted and equipped 767 men direct from civilian life. It was converted into a normal infantry battalion on 9 October that year as 8th Battalion, RUR. It joined 11th Armoured Division as the infantry component of 11th Support Group when that formation was formed in Northern Command in England on 9 March 1941. The Support Group with artillery and a lorried infantry battalion was intended to act as the 'pivot' of an armoured division. 11th Armoured Division's commander, Major-General Percy ('Pat' or 'Hobo') Hobart, was a noted armour pioneer and he trained the division hard and imaginatively. But 8th RUR did not stay with 11th Sp Gp for long, transferring on 8 May to a static home defence role with 215th Independent Infantry Brigade (Home) in the Durham and North Riding County Division. By the end of the year the battalion was with 224th Independent Infantry Brigade (Home) in the D&NR County Division, but in December the division was disbanded and most of its infantry battalions converted to other roles.

== 117th Light Anti-Aircraft Regiment ==
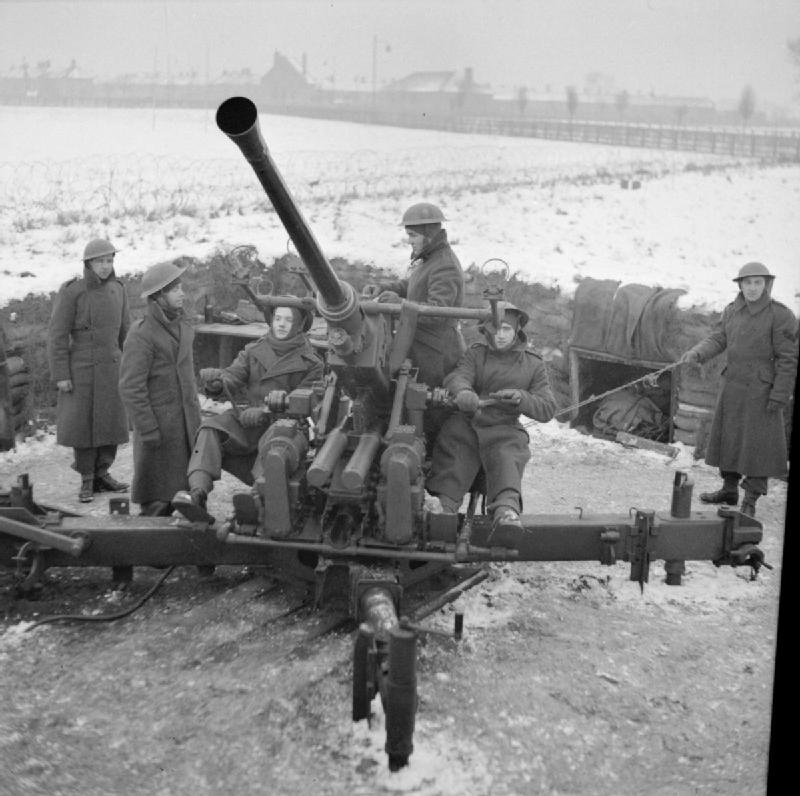
Bofors anti-aircraft gun of 117th LAA (Light Anti-Aircraft) Regiment at Billingham, County Durham, 21 January 1942; note the RUR badge on the side of the helmet.

On 1 January 1942 8th RUR was transferred to the Royal Artillery (RA) to begin retraining as a light anti-aircraft (LAA) regiment equipped with Bofors 40 mm guns. The unit was designated 117th Light Anti-Aircraft Regiment with Regimental Headquarters (RHQ), 383, 384 and 385 LAA Batteries. (Note: One normally reliable source incorrectly states that it was 8th Bn Royal Welch Fusiliers rather than 8th RUR that became 117th LAA Rgt; although this error is not repeated in the rest of the book it has been mistakenly followed by some reference works.) The unit was allowed to retain its rifle regiment customs and traditions including the RUR cap badge. While under training, still in North East England (it was visited by an official photographer at Billingham, County Durham, on 22 January) it was part of Anti-Aircraft Command, but left in February before it had been assigned to an AA brigade.

The regiment joined the field force and was assigned to IX Corps' district from 1 April. In October it was joined by workshop units of the Royal Electrical and Mechanical Engineers (REME) for its mobile role. By November IX Corps had ceased to be a district headquarters and was now a field formation in First Army about to land in North Africa as part of Operation Torch. As its mobile corps LAA unit, 117th LAA Rgt had the following organisation:

- RHQ
- 383, 384 and 385 LAA Btys
- 383, 384 and 385 LAA Workshop Sub-Sections, REME
- 117 LAA Platoon, Royal Army Service Corps

=== Tunisia ===
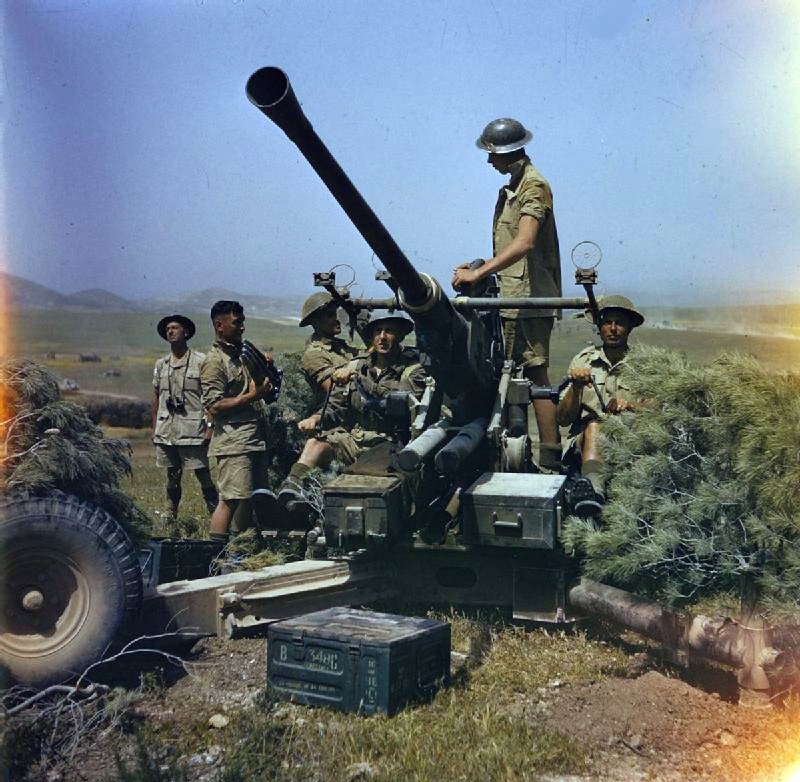
Bofors gun and crew in action near Tunis, May 1943.

The Torch landings began on 8 November 1942, and First Army's units and formations were progressively fed into the fighting. IX Corps had still not embarked by 18 February, but 117th LAA Rgt finally landed at Algiers on 5 March 1943, the date that the Corps Troops were considered to be complete. After the remainder of its equipment arrived three weeks later it moved 500 miles (800 km) eastwards to Le Kef in Tunisia, where the batteries deployed to guard bridges, Corps HQ and the corps troops.

IX Corps launched an attack against the mountain passes at Fondouk on 8 April, and its AA guns were heavily engaged against both air and ground targets. Moving and deploying AA guns in the rough country with underpowered gun tractors was difficult but necessary as units in the forward areas were subjected to regular dive-bombing and ground attacks. Ammunition expenditure by the LAA batteries was high, and supply was sometimes erratic. With greater experience of 'snap' actions against fast low-flying aircraft, Bofors gun units increasingly abandoned using the Kerrison Predictor in favour of the simple 'Stiffkey Stick' deflection sight. By the time First Army prepared for the final attack on Tunis (Operations Vulcan and Strike) the Allied air forces had achieved virtual air superiority over the battlefield. IX Corps played a leading role in the operations, which ended in the surrender of all remaining Axis troops in Tunisia on 13 May.

=== Malta ===
After the fall of Tunis IX Corps HQ was disbanded and 117th LAA Rgt was 'forgotten', deployed at a coastal location near Sousse. The commanding officer (CO) was then told to embark the regiment at Sfax for Malta. On arrival it emerged that Malta Command was expecting 107th LAA Rgt, not 117th. When 107th also landed a few days later it became clear that a mistake had been made. Only after several weeks did it emerge that 117th LAA Rgt should have been assigned to XXX Corps: unable to find 117th LAA Rgt in North Africa, XXX Corps had taken another regiment (from Malta) as its corps LAA unit. The confusion meant that the men's mail was delayed for 11 weeks.

However, with its large establishment of 54 Bofors guns for a mobile LAA unit, the regiment was a useful addition to Malta's air defences just when the Luftwaffe was paying attention to the ships gathering in the island's harbours for the forthcoming Allied invasion of Sicily (Operation Husky). It joined 7th Light Anti-Aircraft Brigade covering the airfields and low-level approaches to the harbours, with RHQ, 383 and 384 LAA Btys deployed at the fleet anchorage at St Paul's Bay in the north of the island and 385 LAA Bty detached to Birżebbuġa in the south. Two Luftwaffe raids were made in July, too high for LAA guns, but these were driven off by the heavy AA (HAA) guns and little damage was done.

=== Sicily ===
Operation Husky was launched on 9/10 July and 117th LAA Regiment embarked for Sicily on 8 August. There were serious problems with the loading of the ships, and some units including 117th LAA Rgt landed without their transport. 73rd AA Brigade had six LAA regiments ashore but only enough transport for a quarter of that number, and it was only by ruthlessly stripping vehicles from batteries in the rear areas that the brigade was able to move others forward. 117th LAA Regiment was sent to defend the airfields at Lentini, being attacked by Messerschmitt Bf 109s on the way. By mid-September, after the capture of Sicily and Eighth Army's landing in mainland Italy (Operation Baytown), 117th LAA Rgt was deployed under 73rd AA Bde to protect the embarkation port and ferries at Milazzo.

=== Italy ===
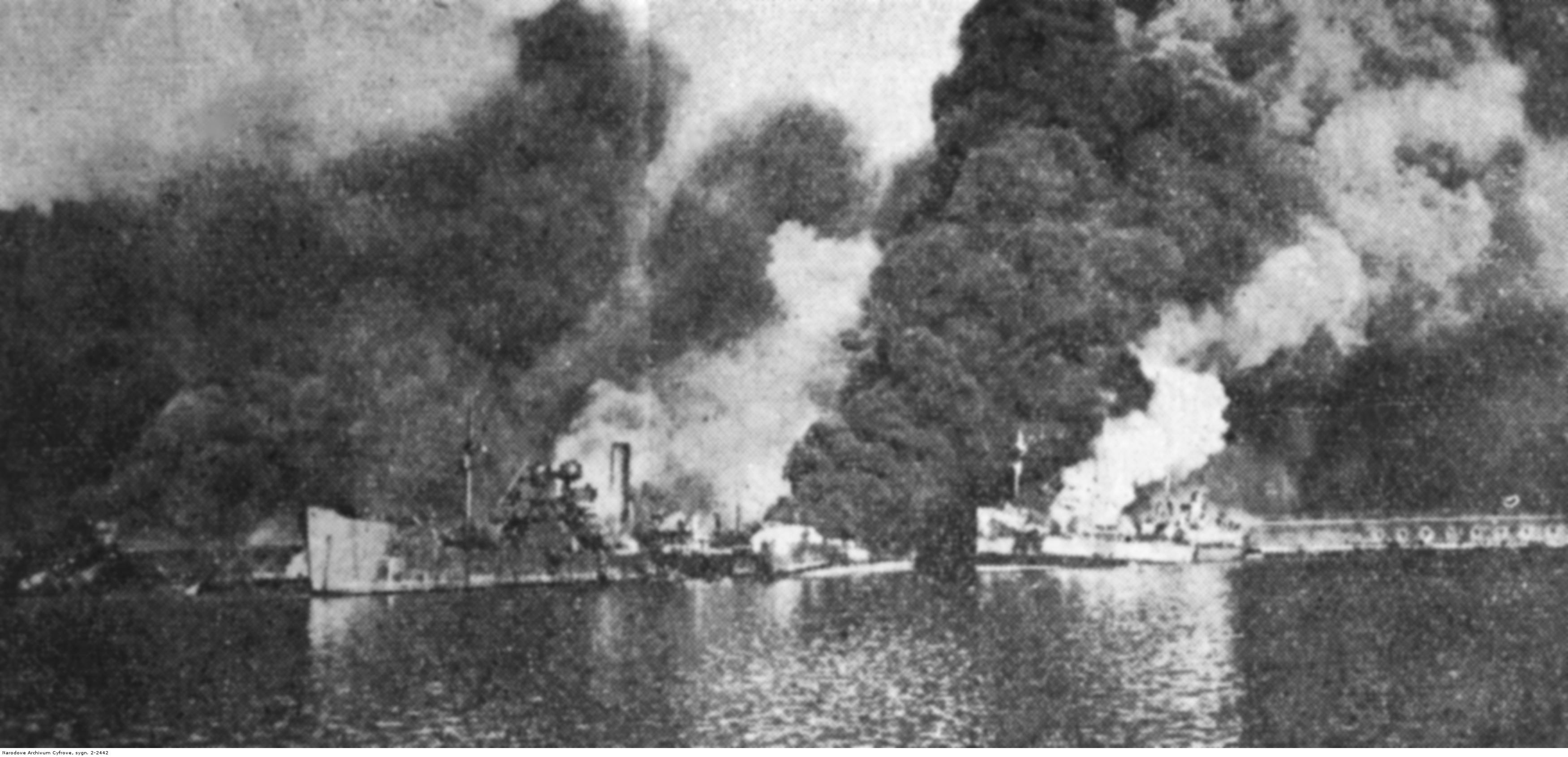
Allied ships burn after the raid on Bari.

On 29 September 117th LAA Rgt crossed to Taranto in Italy and went by road to Bari where it briefly joined 2nd AA Brigade. 62nd AA Bde arrived on 2 October to take over defence of the ports of Bari, Barletta and Manfredonia, and a complex of inland airfields. The Luftwaffe mounted a series of low-intensity raids on Bari during November, then on the night of 2/3 December it carried out a large air raid aimed at knocking out the vital port. The raiders approached from the north dropping large amounts of 'Window' that confused the Ground-controlled interception radar, while communications were also out of order. No night fighters were ordered up until too late, no smokescreen was ignited, and there was no blackout. The result was a disaster: 20 aircraft attacked the port, which was working under floodlights, and the AA fire only began as the bombs started falling. With the guns blind, the LAA guns fired 6283 rounds in concentrations without apparent effect, although the HAA guns claimed some success with predicted fire. An ammunition ship blew up and many other vessels were sunk or damaged; the port was devastated. A Board of Enquiry was held after the raid on Bari and the AA defences and procedures were strengthened in line with its recommendations. A follow-up raid on 13/14 December caused no serious damage and the AA fire shot down some of the attackers.

== Disbandment ==
By the beginning of 1944, the Allied air forces had achieved air supremacy over Italy, but British ground forces were suffering an acute manpower shortage. In June the Chiefs of Staff decided that the number of AA regiments in Italy must be reduced and their fit personnel converted to other roles, particularly infantry. 117th LAA Regiment was one of those selected, and it was disbanded on 15 June 1944.

The Official History notes that some care was taken to post AA gunners to infantry battalions from their home areas. In the case of 117th, originally Royal Ulster Rifles, they were not drafted to Irish units, but in deference to their Rifles heritage to 61st Infantry Brigade. This had recently been formed from three experienced battalions (2nd, 7th and 10th) of the Rifle Brigade to act as the lorried infantry component of 6th Armoured Division. The brigade fought through the battles of 1944–45 in Italy, culminating in the Battle of the Argenta Gap and the advance into Austria at the end of the war.

On 1 April 1947 the remaining wartime personnel of 13th LAA Rgt were redesignated as 117th LAA/Searchlight Rgt when the rest of the regiment reformed in the Territorial Army. However the new 117th was disbanded a month later.

== Notes ==
- Richard Doherty, Hobart's 79th Armoured Division at War: Invention, Innovation and Inspiration, Barnsley: Pen & Sword, 2011, ISBN 978-1-84884-398-1.
- Gen Sir Martin Farndale, History of the Royal Regiment of Artillery: The Years of Defeat: Europe and North Africa, 1939–1941, Woolwich: Royal Artillery Institution, 1988/London: Brasseys, 1996, ISBN 1-85753-080-2.
- J.B.M. Frederick, Lineage Book of British Land Forces 1660–1978, Vol I, Wakefield: Microform Academic, 1984, ISBN 1-85117-007-3.
- J.B.M. Frederick, Lineage Book of British Land Forces 1660–1978, Vol II, Wakefield: Microform Academic, 1984, ISBN 1-85117-009-X.
- Gen Sir William Jackson, History of the Second World War, United Kingdom Military Series: The Mediterranean and Middle East, Vol VI: Victory in the Mediterranean, Part I|: June to October 1944, London: HM Stationery Office, 1987/Uckfield, Naval & Military Press, 2004, ISBN 1-845740-71-8.
- Joslen, H. F. (2003) [1960]. Orders of Battle: Second World War, 1939–1945. Uckfield, East Sussex: Naval and Military Press. ISBN 978-1-84342-474-1.
- Brig C.J.C. Molony,History of the Second World War, United Kingdom Military Series: The Mediterranean and Middle East, Vol V: The Campaign in Sicily 1943 and the Campaign in Italy 3rd September 1943 to 31st March 1944, London: HM Stationery Office, 1973/Uckfield, Naval & Military Press, 2004, ISBN 1-845740-69-6.
- Brig C.J.C. Molony, History of the Second World War, United Kingdom Military Series: The Mediterranean and Middle East, Vol VI: Victory in the Mediterranean, Part I: 1st April to 4th June 1944, London: HM Stationery Office, 1987/Uckfield, Naval & Military Press, 2004, ISBN 1-845740-70-X.
- Maj-Gen I.S.O. Playfair & Brig C.J.C. Molony, History of the Second World War, United Kingdom Military Series: The Mediterranean and Middle East, Vol IV: The Destruction of the Axis forces in Africa, London: HM Stationery Office, 1966/Uckfield, Naval & Military Press, 2004, ISBN 1-845740-68-8.
- Denis Rollo, The Guns and Gunners of Malta, Valetta: Mondial, 1999, ISBN 99909-68-84-5.

== External sources ==
- Royal-Irish.com: The Irish Soldier in the British Army
