= 224th Brigade (United Kingdom) =

4th Provisional Brigade 224th Mixed Brigade 224th Independent Infantry Brigade (Home)
- Active: 1915–1919; 10 October 1940 – 22 December 1941
- Country: United Kingdom
- Branch: British Army
- Type: Infantry Brigade
- Role: Training and Home Defence
- Part of: Durham and North Riding County Division (1941)

The 224th Brigade was a Home Defence formation of the British Army in World War I and World War II. It existed under several variations of the 224th Brigade title.

== World War I ==
On the outbreak of the World War I, the Territorial Force (TF) immediately mobilised for home defence, but shortly afterwards (31 August 1914), its units were authorised to raise 2nd battalions formed from those men who had not volunteered for, or were not fit for, overseas service, together with new volunteers, while the 1st Line went overseas to supplement the Regulars. Early in 1915 the 2nd Line TF battalions were raised to full strength to form new divisions, and began to form Reserve (3rd Line) units to supply drafts. The remaining Home Service men were separated out in May 1915 to form brigades of Coast Defence Battalions (termed Provisional Battalions from June 1915). The 4th Provisional Brigade was formed mainly from details of regiments from Wales and North-West England, with the following composition:

=== Order of Battle ===
- 4th Provisional Yeomanry Squadron
- 4th Provisional Battery Royal Field Artillery
- 4th Provisional Brigade Ammunition Column (from CCXCVI (2/2nd North Midland) Brigade RFA)
- 4th Provisional Brigade Field Company Royal Engineers
- 46th Provisional Battalion (from the Home Service details of the Cheshire Brigade: 4th, 5th, 6th and 7th Bns, Cheshire Regiment)
- 47th Provisional Battalion (from the Home Service details of the North Wales Brigade: 4th (Denbighshire), 5th (Flintshire), 6th (Caernarvonshire and Anglesey) and 7th (Merionethshire and Montgomeryshire) Bns, Royal Welsh Fusiliers)
- 48th Provisional Battalion (from the Home Service details of the Welsh Border Brigade: 1st, 2nd and 3rd Bns, Monmouthshire Regiment, 1st Bn, Herefordshire Regiment)
- 49th Provisional Battalion (from the Home Service details of 10th (Scottish) Bn, King's (Liverpool Regiment), and 4th and 5th Bns, South Lancashire Regiment)
- 50th Provisional Battalion (from the Home Service details of 1st Brecknockshire Battalion, South Wales Borderers, and 4th Bn, King's Shropshire Light Infantry; merged with 46th Provisional Battalion in 1916)
- 51st Provisional Battalion (from the Home Service details of 4th, 5th and 6th Bns, Welsh Regiment)
- 52nd Provisional Battalion (from the Home Service details of 5th Bn, Lancashire Fusiliers; 4th and 5th Bns, East Lancashire Regiment; 4th and 5th Bns, Border Regiment; 8th and 9th Bns, Manchester Regiment.)
- 4th Provisional Cyclist Company (from 9th (Cyclist) Battalion Hampshire) (disbanded April 1916)
- 4th Provisional Brigade Train Army Service Corps (from 58th (2/1st London) Division Train ASC)
- 4th Provisional Field Ambulance Royal Army Medical Corps (from 2nd Welsh Field Ambulance)

In March 1916 the Provisional Brigades were concentrated along the South and East Coast of England. The units of the brigade moved from their home depots to Norfolk, where it was attached to 64th (2nd Highland) Division under the control of Northern Army of Central Force, with its battalions billeted across Norfolk as follows:

- Brigade Headquarters: North Walsham
- 46th Provisional Battalion Walcott
- 47th Provisional Battalion Mundesley
- 48th Provisional Battalion Cromer
- 49th Provisional Battalion Hemsby

In September 1916 the brigade was joined by 2/1st Home Counties (Kent) Heavy Battery, Royal Garrison Artillery (4 x 4.7-inch guns) at Mundesley.

=== 224th Mixed Brigade ===
The Military Service Act 1916 swept away the Home/Foreign service distinction, and all TF soldiers became liable for overseas service, if medically fit. The Provisional Brigades thus became anomalous, and at the end of 1916 their units became numbered battalions of their parent units. Part of their role was physical conditioning to render men fit for drafting overseas. The 4th Provisional Brigade became the 224th Mixed Brigade in December 1916, with its units re-designated as shown below: In May 1918 each of the Mixed Brigades was called upon to provide a battalion (re-designated a Garrison Guard battalion) to reconstitute the 59th (2nd North Midland) Division, which had been virtually destroyed during the German spring offensive. The Brigade supplied the 23rd Cheshire Regiment to the 178th (2/1st Nottinghamshire and Derbyshire) Brigade and immediately raised a new 24th (Home Service) Battalion, Cheshires to take over its coast defence duties. The brigade remained with this composition until the end of the war, after which it was demobilised.

- 4th Provisional Battery became 1206th (East Anglia) Battery RFA
- 2/1st Home Counties (Kent) Heavy Battery RGA
- 4th Provisional Field Company became 643rd (East Anglia) Field Company and 224th Mixed Brigade Signal Section RE
- 46th Provisional Battalion became 23rd Battalion, Cheshire Regiment
- 47th Provisional Battalion became 23rd Battalion, Royal Welch Fusiliers
- 48th Provisional Battalion became 4th Battalion, Monmouthshire Regiment
- 49th Provisional Battalion became 14th Battalion, South Lancashire Regiment
- 2/9th (Cyclist) Battalion, Hampshire Regiment, (joined April 1918)
- 4th Provisional Brigade Train became 836th Horse Transport Company ASC in 64th Division
- 4th Provisional Field Ambulance became 310th and 312th Field Ambulances RAMC

== Second World War ==
=== Formation and Service ===
In 1940, during the Second World War, the brigade number was reactivated for the 224th Independent Infantry Brigade (Home), formed for service in the United Kingdom under the South Wales Area headquarters of Home Forces on 10 October 1940. It was commanded by Brigadier P. Gottwaltz, and comprised newly raised infantry battalions After a brief spell attached to 59th (Staffordshire) Infantry Division, 224th Brigade became part of the Durham and North Riding County Division on 11 March 1941. The brigade was disbanded on 22 December 1941.

=== Composition ===
The composition of 224th Brigade was as follows:

- 7th Battalion, South Wales Borderers (10 October 1940 — 15 November 1941, converted that month to the 90th Light Anti-Aircraft Regiment, Royal Artillery)
- 19th Battalion, Welch Regiment (10 October 1940 — 12 May 1941)
- 9th Battalion, North Staffordshire Regiment (10 October 1940 — December 1941, converted the next year to 154th Regiment Royal Armoured Corps)
- 8th Battalion, Royal Ulster Rifles (from 1 August 1941; converted in January 1942 to 117th Light Anti-Aircraft Regiment, Royal Artillery)
- 8th Battalion, East Yorkshire Regiment (25 November–15 December 1941; converted in January 1942 to 115th Light Anti-Aircraft Regiment, Royal Artillery)

The 224th Brigade number has never been reactivated.

== External sources ==
- Chris Baker, The Long, Long Trail
- The Regimental Warpath 1914–1918
- David Porter's work on Provisional Brigades at Great War Forum
