= 217th Brigade (United Kingdom) =

217th Brigade 217th Independent Infantry Brigade (Home)
- Active: 14 November 1916–8 April 1918; 20 October 1940-22 December 1941
- Country: United Kingdom
- Branch: British Army
- Type: Infantry Brigade
- Role: Training and Home Defence

217th Brigade was a Home Service formation of the British Army during the First and the Second World Wars.

== First World War ==
217th Brigade was formed in late 1916 as part of 72nd Division, which had the dual role of training men for overseas drafts and providing forces for home defence. The original second line Territorial Force battalions of the Northumberland Fusiliers were transferred to the brigade on 14 November 1916 from 188th Brigade, which had been part of 63rd (2nd Northumbrian) Division until that division was disbanded in July 1916. On 21 December 1917 orders were issued to break up 72nd Division. Disbandment began in January 1918 and its last elements dispersed on 8 April 1918.

=== Order of Battle ===
The following infantry battalions served in the brigade:

- 2/4th Battalion, Northumberland Fusiliers, disbanded 24 May 1918
- 2/5th Battalion, Northumberland Fusiliers, disbanded December 1917
- 2/6th Battalion, Northumberland Fusiliers, disbanded December 1917
- 264th Graduated Battalion, joined by 9 July 1917, became 51st (Graduated) Battalion, King's Own Yorkshire Light Infantry 27 October 1917, moved to 208th Brigade March 1918
- 265th Graduated Battalion, joined by 24 September 1917, became 52nd (Graduated) Battalion, Royal Fusiliers, 27 October 1917, moved to 204th Brigade March 1918

== Second World War ==
=== Formation and Service ===
A new brigade under the title of 217th Independent Infantry Brigade (Home) was formed for service in the United Kingdom on 20 October 1940 under the Northumbrian Area headquarters. At first it was composed of infantry battalions from North-East England. The 217th Brigade transferred to the Durham and North Riding County Division when that formation was created on 12 March 1941. The Divisional headquarters ceased to function on 1 December 1941, and 217th Brigade HQ disbanded on 22 December, all its battalions having been previously posted away.

=== Order of Battle ===
The following units served in the brigade:

- 12th Battalion, West Yorkshire Regiment (20 October 1940 — 17 August 1941)
- 8th Battalion, East Yorkshire Regiment (20 October 1940 — 24 November 1941) – converted in January 1942 to 115th Light Anti-Aircraft Regiment, Royal Artillery)
- 12th Battalion, Green Howards (20 October 1940 — 9 May 1941) – converted the next year to 161st Regiment Royal Armoured Corps
- 15th Battalion, Durham Light Infantry (20 October 1940 — 17 November 1941) – converted the next year to 155th Regiment Royal Armoured Corps
- 12th Battalion, Royal Welch Fusiliers (9 May–23 October 1941)

=== Commanders ===
The following officers commanded the brigade:

- Brig R.E. Holmes à Court
- Brig E. Woodhouse (from 12 March 1941)
