= Durham and North Riding County Division =

- Division insignia of the Durham and North Riding County Division
- Active: 12 March 1941 – 1 December 1941
- Country: United Kingdom
- Branch: British Army
- Type: Static Division
- Role: Home Defence

Commanders
- Notable commanders: Major-General Philip James Shears

The Durham and North Riding County Division was a coastal defence formation of the British Army during the Second World War. It existed only from 12 March 1941 until 1 December 1941, when it was redesignated Durham and North Riding Coastal Area and the subordinate brigade headquarters were disbanded. Most of the infantry battalions were then converted to other roles with the Royal Artillery or the Royal Armoured Corps. In its short existence the division had just one general officer commanding, Major-General P. J. Shears. It was under the command from X Corps from formation until 9 April and then under IX Corps.

The divisional sign was a pun on the name of the division's commander and a reference to the wool industry of the area.

== Order of battle ==
County divisions were static infantry-only formations with any supporting arms on loan from other formations. The division/s order of battle was as follows:

- 215th Independent Infantry Brigade (Home)
  - 7th Battalion, Loyal Regiment (North Lancashire) – left 27 November 1941
  - 8th Battalion, Loyal Regiment (North Lancashire) – left 27 November 1941
  - 9th Battalion, Loyal Regiment (North Lancashire) – left 19 November 1941
  - 12th Battalion, Royal Welch Fusiliers – to 217 Bde 9 May – 23 October 1941; left 21 December 1941
  - 8th Battalion, Royal Ulster Rifles – from 11th Armoured Division 9 May 1941; left 31 May 1941
- 217th Independent Infantry Brigade (Home)
  - 12th Battalion, West Yorkshire Regiment – disbanded 17 August 1941
  - 8th Battalion, East Yorkshire Regiment – to 224 Bde 24 November 1941
  - 12th Battalion Green Howards – to 11th Armoured Division 9 May 1941
  - 15th Battalion, The Durham Light Infantry – left 17 November 1941
  - 12th Battalion, The Royal Welch Fusiliers – from 215 Bde 9 May 1941; left 23 October 1941
- 224th Independent Infantry Brigade (Home)
  - 7th Battalion, South Wales Borderers – left 15 November 1941
  - 19th Battalion, Welch Regiment – left 12 May 1941
  - 9th Battalion, The North Staffordshire Regiment – left 15 December 1941
  - 8th Battalion, Royal Ulster Rifles – from 215 Bde 1 August 1941; left 15 December 1941
  - 8th Battalion, East Yorkshire Regiment – from 217 Bde 25 November 1941, left 15 December 1941

== See also ==
- List of British divisions in World War II
