= Philip James Shears =

British Army general

Major-General Philip James Shears CB
- Born: 6 April 1887
- Died: 7 April 1972 (aged 85)
- Military career
- Allegiance: United Kingdom
- Branch: British Army
- Service years: 1914–1945
- Rank: Major-General
- Commands: West Riding District (1941–44); Durham and North Riding County Division (1941); Northumbrian Area (1939–41); Army Technical School (1935–39)
- Conflicts: First World War; Second World War
- Awards: Companion of the Order of the Bath; Mentioned in Despatches; Croix de Guerre (France)

Major-General Philip James Shears, CB (6 April 1887 – 7 April 1972) was a British Army officer.

== Career ==
After working for the firm Dumas & Wylie, Shears joined the British Army in August 1914 and was commissioned with the 13th Battalion of the Rifle Brigade. He was wounded during the Battle of the Somme in 1916 and the following year was given a regular commission with the Royal Dublin Fusiliers. He was awarded the Croix de Guerre in 1919. After the Fusiliers were disbanded in 1922, he served with the Border Regiment in Britain, India, China, Malta and the Sudan until 1935.

Shears was appointed commandant of the Army Technical School in Chepstow in 1935. During the Second World War he served as commanding officer of the Northumbrian Area (1939–1941), commanding officer of the Durham and North Riding County Division (1941) and district officer commanding the West Riding District (1941–1944). He was appointed a Companion of the Order of the Bath in 1944. He held the rank of colonel at the outbreak of the war and was promoted to the honorary rank of major-general upon retirement in 1945. He later served as Colonel of the Border Regiment from 1947 to 1952.

After the war Shears worked with the Officers' Association, helping to find civilian jobs for demobilized officers. In 1948 he published The Story of the Border Regiment, 1939–1945. He joined the Huguenot Society of London in 1955 and was its president from 1959 to 1962 and later its vice-president. An active member of the society for many years, he also wrote a number of articles for its journal.

== Personal life ==
Shears was born in Surbiton, Surrey, to James Charles Shears (1857–1924), a mechanical engineer, and Beatrice Jane Margaret Dumas (1859–1917). He was descended from the Shears family of coppersmiths and the Huguenot Henry Dumas (1794–1843), who settled in England in the 1820s.

In 1911 Shears married Mary Ellen Gibbons (1888–1976). Their only child, Pauline Mary Beatrice Shears (1912–2002), married James MacNabb.
