= Kerrison Predictor =

Anti-aircraft fire-control system

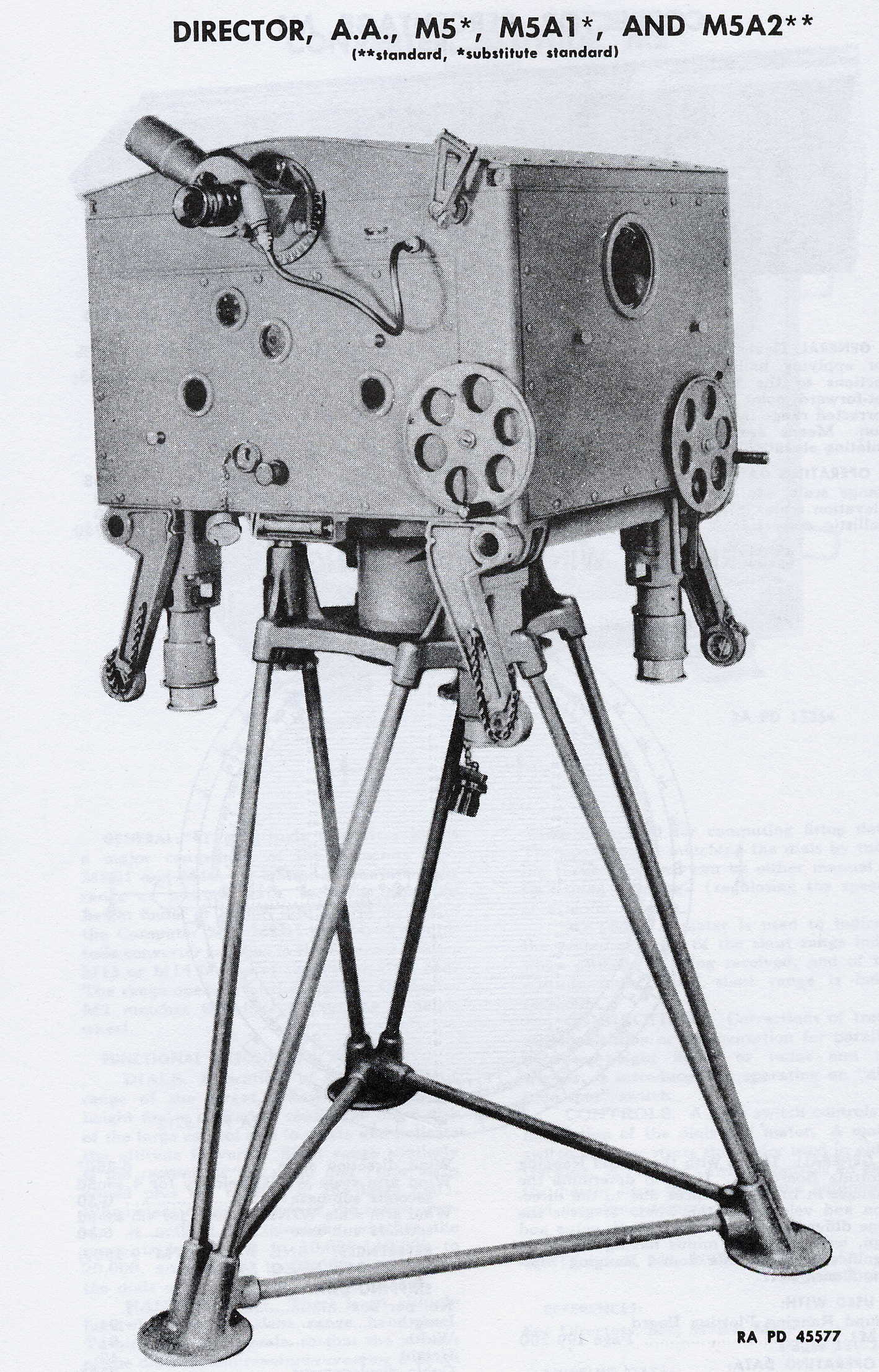
The Singer M5 was the US version of the Kerrison Predictor. The sighting telescope is near the top, with the elevation handwheel below it and the range handwheel at the right. A second telescope is on the opposite side, not visible here, along with the azimuth handwheel.

The Kerrison Predictor was one of the first fully automated anti-aircraft fire-control systems. It was used to automate the aiming of the British Army's Bofors 40 mm guns and provide accurate lead calculations through simple inputs on three main handwheels.

The predictor could aim a gun at an aircraft based on simple inputs like the observed speed and the angle to the target. Such devices had been used on ships for gunnery control for some time, and versions such as the Vickers Predictor were available for larger anti-aircraft guns intended to be used against high-altitude bombers. Kerrison's analog computer was the first to be fast enough to be used in the demanding high-speed low-altitude role, which involved very short engagement times and high angular rates.

The design was also adopted for use in the United States, where it was produced by Singer Corporation as the M5 Antiaircraft Director, later updated as the M5A1 and M5A2. The M6 was mechanically identical, differing only in running on UK-style 50 Hz power.

== History ==
By the late 1930s, both Vickers and Sperry had developed predictors for use against high-altitude bombers. However, low-flying aircraft presented a very different problem, with very short engagement times and high angular rates of motion, but at the same time less need for ballistic accuracy. Machine guns had been the preferred weapon against these targets, aimed by eye and swung by hand, but these no longer had the performance needed to deal with the larger and faster aircraft of the 1930s.

The British Army's new Bofors 40 mm guns were intended as their standard low-altitude anti-aircraft weapons. However, existing gunnery control systems were inadequate for the purpose; the range was too far to "guess" the lead using conventional iron sights, but at the same time close enough that the angle could change faster than the gunners could turn the traversal handles. Trying to operate a calculating gunsight at the same time was an added burden on the gunner. Making matters worse was that these ranges were exactly where the Luftwaffe's dive bombers, which were quickly proving to be a decisive weapon in the Blitzkrieg, were attacking from.

The problem was taken up by Major A.V. Kerrison of the British Army, who had been working as the Army liaison at the Admiralty Research Laboratory, Teddington, through 1930s. Kerrison had worked on several of the Royal Navy's gunnery computers and took up the problem in the late 1930s. After the war, Kerrison went on to become Director of Aeronautical and Engineering Research at the British Admiralty.

His solution was a calculator that dispensed with many of the corrections and timing issues seen in devices like the Vickers Predictor which were intended for high-altitude fire, where the rounds took 10 to 20 seconds to reach their targets and the long range demanded extremely accurate angle calculations. Neither was needed in this role. Instead, it made a relatively simple calculation of the impact point based on relative motion as provided by the operator. Key to the concept was the use of two ball-and-disk integrators, used in this case to maintain a constant rate of motion. On top of the motorized disk were two metal balls, set one on top of the other with the bottom one in contact with the disk and the second in contact with mechanisms that drove the Predictor's laying handwheels.

The two balls were clutched so they could be separated or forced together. For the initial setup, the operator would declutch the balls and use the handwheels to bring the Predictor's telescope onto the target. This also moved the two balls across the surface of the disk, although they were not in contact with it. Once the predictor was properly aimed, the clutch would be moved to bring the two balls into contact with the disk, at which point the rotation of the disk would cause the balls to rotate and thus automatically move the telescope to stay aligned with the target.

As the original inputs from the handwheels were unlikely to be perfectly accurate, the system would normally begin to "drift" away from the target. The operators would then move the handwheel to bring the target back into the center, which also slid the balls over the disk to a new location, changing their rotation speed, and thereby adjusting the rate of motion to properly track the target again. The position of the balls over the disk directly represents the rate of angular motion of the target. A third setting in the clutch reset the system to begin tracking a different target.

The two rates, in azimuth and altitude, were used to calculate the angular rate of the target, and from that, the vector along which the target was moving relative to the gun. This does not provide a complete solution; the shell from the gun takes a certain time to fly to the target, during which time the target moves. This requires the gun to "lead" the target to account for the motion during this time. Since the range to the target is independent of its motion, this value had to be input separately, initially by a separate crewman simply estimating the range or using some form of optical rangefinder, although small Gun Laying radars for this task became common during World War II.

The "output" of the device drove hydraulic servo-motors attached to the traversal and elevation gears of the otherwise unmodified Bofors gun, allowing it to follow the predictor's indications automatically without manual intervention. The gunners simply kept the gun loaded, while the three aimers simply had to point the Predictor, mounted on a large tripod, at the target. The Kerrison predictor did not calculate fuse settings, as the shells fired by the 40 mm Bofors gun, with which it was designed to work, were contact-fused.

The Predictor proved to be able to hit practically anything that flew in a straight line, and it was particularly effective against dive bombers. It was also very complex, including over 1,000 precision parts and weighing over 500 lb (230 kg), even though much of it was made of aluminium to reduce weight. With the demands of the RAF for almost all light metals and machinists, the Predictor was far too difficult for the Army to produce in any quantity.

While the Predictor proved to be an excellent addition to the Bofors, it was not without its faults. The main problem was that the system required a fairly large electrical generator in order to drive the gun, increasing the logistics load in supplying the generators with fuel. Setting the system up was also a fairly complex task, and not something that could be done "on the fly". In the end, they were used almost entirely for static emplacements, field units continuing to rely on their original iron sights or the simple Stiffkey-Stick sights that were introduced in late 1943.

The No.7 anti-aircraft composite predictor, also designed by Kerrison was similar in some ways. It was originally developed for the 6-pounder naval gun, for close-in defence and also against targets at intermediate altitudes of 6,000 to 14,000 ft (1,800 to 4,300 m). It was later adapted for use with the 40 mm Bofors.

== US service ==
Although it was more accurate than the Kerrison predictor, Sperry was unable to keep up with production of its more expensive and complex M-7 director. In September 1940, General George C. Marshall asked the British for the loan of four Bofors 40 mm guns with Kerrison Predictors for testing.

During testing the Kerrison Predictor provided accurate fire control to a range in excess of 1,500 m (4,900 ft), and the Bofors gun was reliable. In the fall of 1940, the Ordnance Department standardized the Kerrison Predictor for use with their 37 mm gun. By February 1941, the U.S. Navy had adopted the Bofors for use on their ships. To ease production problems, the Army reluctantly standardized on the 40 mm in February 1941; the U.S. was building the Bofors for the British under the Lend-Lease Program.

The Predictor's plans were passed to Sperry Corporation, who were just commencing production of their own complex high-altitude system, the M7 Computing Sight, and had no excess capacity to produce the new design as well. Instead, they completed changes needed to adapt the Predictor to U.S. production and sent the plans back to the Army for production elsewhere. In December 1940 the Singer Corporation was contracted to produce 1,500 predictors per month to equip the Army's existing 37 mm guns while production of the 40 mm Bofors was ramped up. Two models were built initially, the M5 running on US-standard 115 V 60 Hz power, and the M6 for British use, running on 50 V 50 Hz power. The original M5 was designed to use an external torque amplifier, which added to the complexity. This was addressed in the M5A1, which used a more powerful ball-and-disk system that eliminated the need for an external amplifier.

To produce the devices rapidly enough, Singer implemented massive changes in the company, including building new factories and the switching of a foundry from steel to aluminium. Production did not begin until January 1943, but the entire order was filled by the middle of 1944. For a brief time, some of the U.S. Army's Bofors guns were equipped with the Sperry M7, but these were replaced in the field as soon as M5s became available.

With aircraft speeds increasing dramatically during the war, even the speed of the Kerrison Predictor proved lacking by the end. Nevertheless, the Predictor demonstrated that effective gunnery required some sort of reasonably powerful computing support, and in 1944 Bell Labs started delivery of a new system based around an electronic analog computer. The timing proved excellent; late that summer, the Germans started attacking London with the V-1 flying bomb, which flew at high speeds at low altitudes. After a month of limited success against them, every available anti-aircraft gun was moved to the strip of land on the approach to London, and the new sights proved to be more than capable against them. Daytime attacks were soon abandoned.

Long after the war, U.S. M5s started appearing in surplus shops in the late 1950s. John Whitney purchased one (and later a Sperry M7) and connected the electrical outputs to servos controlling the positioning of small lit targets and light bulbs. He then modified the "mathematics" of the system to move the targets in various mathematically controlled ways, a technique he referred to as incremental drift. As the power of the systems grew, they eventually evolved into motion control photography, a widely used technique in special effects filming.

== See also ==
- Director (military)
- Fire-control system
- Gun data computer
- Rangekeeper
