= 218th Brigade (United Kingdom) =

218th Brigade 218th Independent Infantry Brigade (Home) 281th Independent Infantry Brigade
- Formation sign worn by 218th Independent Infantry Brigade.
- Active: 1916–8 April 1918; 21 October 1940-10 November 1942
- Country: United Kingdom
- Branch: British Army
- Type: Infantry Brigade
- Role: Training and Home Defence

Insignia
- Badge worn when in the Yorkshire County Division

The 218th Brigade was a Home Service formation of the British Army during the First and the Second World Wars.

== First World War ==
The 218th Brigade was raised in late 1916 as part of 73rd Division, which had the dual role of training men for overseas drafts and providing forces for home defence. The brigade had previously been the 9th Provisional Brigade, without any divisional affiliation. On 21 December 1917 orders were issued to break up 73rd Division. Disbandment began in January 1918 and its last elements disappeared on 8 April 1918.

=== Order of Battle ===
The following infantry battalions served in the brigade:

- 41st Provisional Battalion, became 12th Battalion, King's Own (Royal Lancaster Regiment) on 1 January 1917; disbanded 29 March 1918.
- 42nd Provisional Battalion, became 14th Battalion, Loyal North Lancashire Regiment on 1 January 1917; disbanded December 1917.
- 44th Provisional Battalion, became 26th Battalion, King's (Liverpool Regiment) on 1 January 1917; disbanded 29 March 1918.
- 267th (Infantry) Battalion, Training Reserve, became 52nd (Graduated) Battalion, Leicestershire Regiment, moved to 207th (2nd East Midland) Brigade in January 1918.

== Second World War ==
=== Formation and Service ===
A new brigade under the title of the 218th Independent Infantry Brigade (Home) was formed for service in the United Kingdom on 21 October 1940 under the Yorkshire Area headquarters. At first it was primarily composed of infantry battalions from Yorkshire regiments. The Brigade transferred to Yorkshire County Division when that formation was created on 19 March 1941. The Divisional headquarters became East Riding Coastal Area on 1 December 1941. On 22 December the Brigade was re-designated as the 218th Independent Infantry Brigade. The Brigade later transferred to the Durham and North Riding Coastal Area, then to the Northumbrian District before disbanding on 10 November 1942, when its battalions were converted to anti-tank regiments.

=== Order of Battle ===
The following units served in the brigade:

- As part of Yorkshire Area or the County Division
  - 8th Battalion, King's Own Yorkshire Light Infantry (22 October 1940 — 6 November 1941)
  - 11th Battalion, York and Lancaster Regiment (22 October 1940 — 30 November 1941)
  - 10th Battalion, Duke of Wellington's Regiment (23 October 1940 — 30 November 1941)
  - 14th Battalion, Sherwood Foresters (23 October 1940 — 29 November 1940)
- Under the various Military Districts
  - 11th Battalion, York and Lancaster Regiment (1 December 1941 — 23 September 1942)
  - 10th Battalion, Duke of Wellington's Regiment (1 December 1941 — 12 September 1942)
  - 6th (Pioneer) Battalion, King's Own Royal Regiment (Lancaster) (29 November 1940 — 23 May 1941)
  - 7th Battalion, King's Shropshire Light Infantry (29 November 1941 — 13 October 1942, converted later that year into the 99th Anti-Tank Regiment Royal Artillery)
  - 11th Battalion, Gloucestershire Regiment (11 December 1941 — 31 January 1942, converted into 118th Light Anti-Aircraft Regiment, Royal Artillery)
  - 2nd Battalion, Liverpool Scottish (13 September — 9 November 1942, converted later that year into the 89th Anti-Tank Regiment Royal Artillery)
  - 19th Battalion, Royal Fusiliers (27 September — 30 October 1942, converted later that year into the 98th Anti-Tank Regiment Royal Artillery)

=== Commanders ===
The following officers commanded 218 Brigade:

- Brig D.C. Butterworth (21 October 1940 – 30 July 1941)
- Brig T.F. Given (from 30 July 1941)
