= 206th Brigade =

206th Brigade may refer to:

- 206th Rocket Brigade, Soviet Union
- 206th (2nd Essex) Brigade, United Kingdom
- 206th Independent Infantry Brigade, United Kingdom

== See also ==
- 206th Division (disambiguation)
