= 7th Royal Lancashire Militia (Rifles) =

Auxiliary unit of the British Army

7th Royal Lancashire Militia (Rifles) 3rd & 4th Bns Lancashire Fusiliers
- Active: 21 February 1855–April 1953
- Country: United Kingdom
- Branch: Militia/Special Reserve
- Role: Infantry
- Size: 1–2 Battalions
- Garrison/HQ: Wellington Barracks, Bury
- Engagements: Second Boer War

The 7th Royal Lancashire Militia (Rifles) (7th RLM) was an auxiliary (Note: It is incorrect to describe the British Militia as 'irregular': throughout their history they were equipped and trained exactly like the line regiments of the regular army, and once embodied in time of war they were fulltime professional soldiers for the duration of their enlistment.) regiment raised in the county of Lancashire in North West England just before the Crimean War. It later became part of the Lancashire Fusiliers. Although primarily intended for home defence, its battalions saw active service during the Second Boer War. Following conversion to the Special Reserve (SR) under the Haldane Reforms it supplied reinforcements to the fighting battalions during World War I. After a shadowy postwar existence the unit was finally disbanded in 1953.

== Background ==
The universal obligation to military service in the Shire levy was long established in England and its legal basis was updated by two acts of 1557 (4 & 5 Ph. & M. cc. 2 and 3), which placed selected men, the 'trained bands', under the command of Lords Lieutenant appointed by the monarch. This is seen as the starting date for the organised county militia in England. It was an important element in the country's defence at the time of the Spanish Armada in the 1580s, and control of the militia was one of the areas of dispute between King Charles I and Parliament that led to the English Civil War. The English Militia was re-established under local control in 1662 after the Restoration of the monarchy, and the Lancashire Militia fought in King William III's campaign in Ireland in 1690–91, and against the Jacobite Risings in 1715 and 1745. However, between periods of national emergency the militia was regularly allowed to decline.

Under threat of French invasion during the Seven Years' War a series of Militia Acts from 1757 reorganised the county militia regiments, the men being conscripted by means of parish ballots (paid substitutes were permitted) to serve for three years. In peacetime they assembled for 28 days' annual training. Lancashire's quota was one regiment, which received the title Royal Lancashire Militia in 1761. These reformed regiments were 'embodied' for permanent service in home defence during the Seven Years' War, the War of American Independence, the French Revolutionary War and the Napoleonic Wars. By 1800 the Royal Lancashire Militia had expanded to three regiments. During the French wars, the militia were embodied for a whole generation, and became regiments of full-time professional soldiers (though restricted to service in the British Isles), which the regular army increasingly saw as a prime source of recruits. They served in coast defences, manning garrisons, guarding prisoners of war, and for internal security, such as the time of the Luddite disturbances. However, in the years of the long peace after the Battle of Waterloo the militia was allowed to decline again, the ballot and annual training being suspended.

== 7th Royal Lancashire Militia (Rifles) ==
The long-standing Militia of the United Kingdom was revived by the Militia Act 1852, enacted during a period of international tension. As before, units were raised and administered on a county basis, and filled by voluntary enlistment (although conscription by means of the militia ballot might be used if the counties failed to meet their quotas). Training was for 56 days on enlistment, then for 21–28 days per year, during which the men received full army pay. Under the Act, militia units could be embodied by Royal Proclamation for full-time service in three circumstances:

1. 'Whenever a state of war exists between Her Majesty and any foreign power'.
2. 'In all cases of invasion or upon imminent danger thereof'.
3. 'In all cases of rebellion or insurrection'.

With the threat of war against Russia, the three Lancashire regiments were ordered to recruit up to their full establishments of 1200 men. When war broke out in 1854 an expeditionary force was sent to the Crimea and the militia were embodied for home defence and service in overseas garrisons. Additional infantry and artillery militia regiments were also formed in Lancashire at this time including the 7th Lancashire Militia (Rifles) raised at Bury on 21 February 1855. The Hon Charles James Fox Stanley, younger son of the Earl of Derby and a former lieutenant-colonel in the Grenadier Guards and former colonel of the 2nd Royal Lancashire Militia (The Duke of Lancaster's Own Rifles), was commissioned as colonel of the new regiment. John Edward Madocks, former captain in the 13th Light Dragoons, was the Lieutenant-Colonel Commandant and John Hardy Thursby, former lieutenant in the 90th Foot, as the senior major. The seven militia infantry regiments in Lancashire divided the county up, with the 7th at Bury recruiting from the Manchester and Salford area.

The newly raised regiment was not embodied for the Crimean War but began the round of peacetime annual training. On 15 November 1864 it received the 'Royal' title held by the senior Lancashire regiments, becoming the 7th Royal Lancashire Militia (Rifles) (7th RLM). The Militia Reserve introduced in 1867 consisted of present and former militiamen who undertook to serve overseas in case of war.

=== Cardwell reforms ===
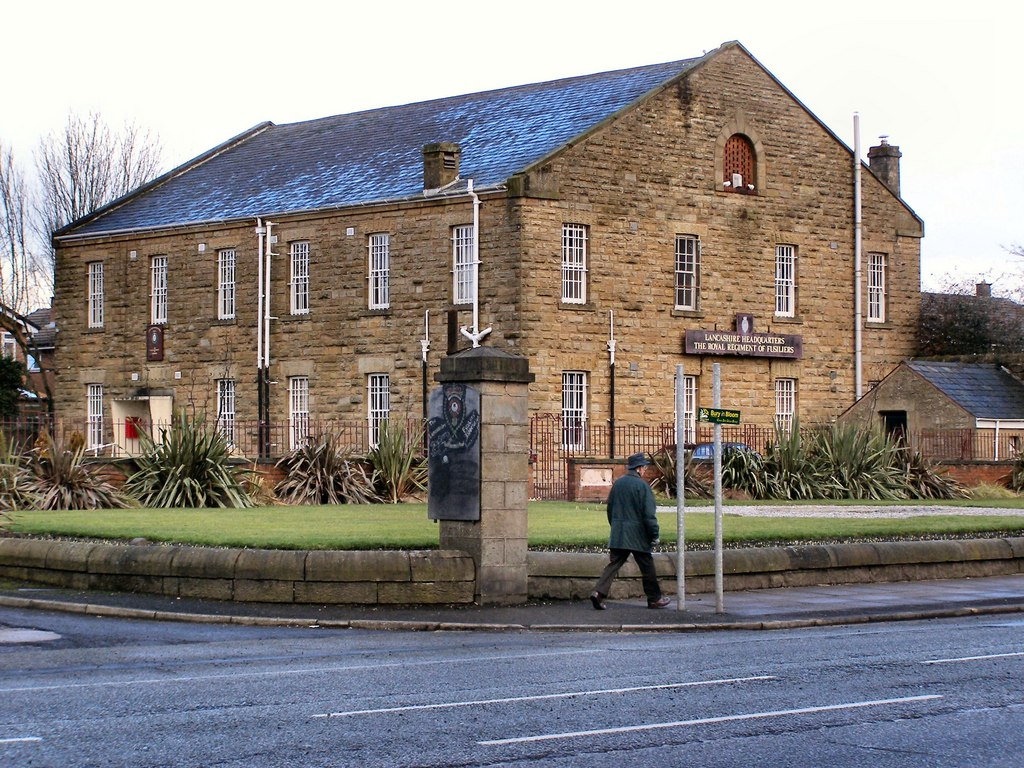
The Lancashire Fusiliers' Regimental Headquarters at Wellington Barracks.

Under the 'Localisation of the Forces' scheme introduced by the Cardwell Reforms of 1872, Militia regiments were brigaded with regular and Volunteer battalions in a regimental district sharing a permanent depot at a suitable county town. Seven double-battalion or paired single-battalion regular regiments were assigned to Lancashire, and each was linked with one of the militia regiments. The militia now came under the War Office rather than their county lords lieutenant, and officers' commissions were signed by the Queen. The 7th RLM was linked with the double-battalion 20th (East Devonshire) Regiment of Foot in Sub-District No 17 (Lancashire), with the depot at Wellington Barracks, Bury. The intention was for the 7th RLM to form its own 2nd Battalion, but this did not happen for a number of years.

Although often referred to as brigades, the regimental districts were purely administrative organisations, but in a continuation of the Cardwell Reforms a mobilisation scheme began to appear in the Army List from December 1875. This assigned regular and militia units to places in an order of battle of corps, divisions and brigades for the 'Active Army', even though these formations were entirely theoretical, with no staff or services assigned. The 5th, 6th and 7th Royal Lancashire Militia formed 2nd Brigade of 3rd Division, VIII Corps at Melrose, Scottish Borders.

== 3rd and 4th Battalions, Lancashire Fusiliers ==
The Childers Reforms completed the Cardwell process by incorporating the militia battalions into the expanded county regiments. On 1 July 1881 the 20th Foot became the Lancashire Fusiliers at Bury with the 7th RLM as its 3rd Battalion. The second militia battalion was finally formed as the 4th Battalion on 1 April 1891, the 3rd and 4th being administered as a double-battalion regiment until 1 August 1900.

In April 1898 the Lancashire Fusiliers began forming two additional regular battalions, which took the 3rd and 4th places, causing the militia to be renumbered 5th and 6th Battalions.

=== Second Boer War ===
After the disasters of Black Week at the start of the Second Boer War in December 1899, most of the regular army was sent to South Africa, followed by many militia reservists as reinforcements. Militia units were embodied to replace them for home defence and a number volunteered for active service or to garrison overseas stations.

The 6th Battalion was one of the first militia units embodied, on 13 December 1899, and immediately volunteered for overseas service, embarking for South Africa with a strength of 20 officers and 659 ORs under the command of Lt-Col F.C. Romer. On arrival at Cape Town on 7 March 1900 its orders for Kimberley were countermanded and it was sent to the Orange River Colony where a Boer resurgence was threatened. Detachments from the battalion guarded the Orange River bridge on the Kimberley railway and numerous other posts, including Christiana. These detachments were engaged in constant patrolling and convoy escort, and skirmishes with the Boers were frequent. The Christiana detachment was there for over a year, with shots exchanged every day and 19 separate minor engagements recorded.

On 25 November 1900 the main body of 6th Battalion was ordered to join Maj-Gen Henry Settle's column operating against J.B.M. Hertzog's Commando. On 28 November the column attacked Hertzog who was holding a strong position at Luckhoff, deployed along a 9 miles (14 km) semi-circle of Kopjes. The Boers held on for five hours under artillery fire. They were then cleared from their position by the 6th Lancashire Fusiliers at the point of the bayonet, a rare example of offensive action by militia, who were usually relegated to garrison and escort duties.

On 7 January 1901 the battalion took over the Carnarvon district, where it was actively involved in patrolling, escorting guns and convoys, and in operations against Commandant Maritz's Commando. On 26 July the battalion was moved to Hanover Road and later to Beaufort West, providing detachments to build defensive posts and forts around Worcester. On 19 September the battalion entrained for Cape Town where it embarked for home. It was disembodied on 14 October 1901, having lost 18 other ranks (ORs) killed or died of disease. It was awarded the Battle Honour South Africa 1900–01 and the participants received the Queen's South Africa Medal with clasps for 'Cape Colony', 'Orange Free State', and 'Transvaal'.

The 5th Lancashire Fusiliers was embodied from 19 February to 17 October 1900. It was re-embodied on 6 May 1901 and volunteered for overseas service. It embarked for South Africa on 4 June under the command of Lt-Col F.F. Mackenzie with a strength of 903 of all ranks, having already sent 300 militia reservists to reinforce the regulars. On arrival at Cape Town on 23 June the battalion proceeded in two wings to Springfontein and was then split into detachments at various places, while battalion headquarters (HQ) went to Naauwpoort. On 28 December the battalion was redeployed, HQ and the main body going to Colesberg where it was employed on blockhouse duty, while two companies garrisoned Port Elizabeth and one was at Cradock. Detachments from the battalion manned No 13 Armoured Train, which took part in operations against the remaining Boer Commandos. The battalion went home after the Treaty of Vereeniging and was disembodied on 25 July 1902, having lost 15 ORs killed or died of disease. It received the South Africa 1901–02 battle honour and the medal with clasps for 'Orange Free State', 'Cape Colony', and 'South Africa 1901 and 1902'. Lieutenant-Col Romer was awarded the CMG.

== Special Reserve ==
After the Boer War, the future of the Militia was called into question. There were moves to reform the Auxiliary Forces (Militia, Yeomanry and Volunteers) to take their place in the six army corps proposed by St John Brodrick as Secretary of State for War. However, little of Brodrick's scheme was carried out.

Under the sweeping Haldane Reforms of 1908, the Militia was replaced by the Special Reserve, a semi-professional force similar to the previous Militia Reserve, whose role was to provide reinforcement drafts for regular units serving overseas in wartime. The two militia battalions of the Lancashire Fusiliers became the 3rd (Reserve) and 4th (Extra Reserve) Battalions on 2 August 1908 (the 3rd and 4th regular battalions having been disbanded in 1906).

== World War I ==
=== Mobilisation ===
The Special Reserve was embodied at the outbreak of World War I on 4 August 1914 and on 8 August the 3rd and 4th Lancashire Fusiliers proceeded from Bury to their war stations. For the 3rd Bn this was at Hull as part of the Humber Garrison, while The 4th Bn went to Barrow-in-Furness. They carried out the dual tasks of garrison duties and preparing reinforcement drafts of regular reservists, special reservists, recruits and returning wounded for the two regular battalions, the 1st serving at Gallipoli and then on the Western Front, the 2nd on the Western Front for the whole war.

After Lord Kitchener issued his call for volunteers in August 1914, the battalions of the 1st, 2nd and 3rd New Armies ('K1', 'K2' and 'K3' of 'Kitchener's Army') were quickly formed at the regimental depots. The SR battalions also swelled with new recruits and were soon well above their establishment strength. On 8 October 1914 each SR battalion was ordered to use the surplus to form a service battalion of the 4th New Army ('K4'). Accordingly, the 3rd (Reserve) Bn formed the 13th (Service) Bn (see below). 4th (Extra Reserve) Bn was intended to form a 14th Bn, but this was cancelled on 25 October.

=== 3rd (Reserve) Battalion ===
In November 1916 the battalion moved from Hull to Withernsea, still in the Humber Garrison, where it remained for the rest of the war.

After the Armistice with Germany the 3rd Bn was disembodied on 26 July 1919 when the remaining personnel were drafted to the 1st Bn.

=== 4th (Extra Reserve) Battalion ===
In October 1916 the battalion moved to Barry, South Wales, in the Severn Garrison, where it remained.

After the Armistice the 4th Bn was disembodied on 16 April 1919.

=== 13th (Reserve) Battalion ===
This battalion was formed as 13th (Service) Bn as a K4 battalion at Hull on 5 December 1914 from the surplus personnel of 3rd (Reserve) Bn. It moved to Chesterfield, Derbyshire, and began training for active service. On 10 April 1915 the War Office decided to convert the K4 battalions into 2nd Reserve units, providing drafts for the K1–K3 battalions in the same way that the SR was doing for the Regular battalions. The Lancashire Fusiliers battalion became 13th (Reserve) Battalion, and moved to Lichfield in Staffordshire, in 3rd Reserve Brigade, where it trained drafts for the 9th, 10th, 11th and 12th (Service) Bns. In November it moved to Rugeley, and then in December to Brocton on Cannock Chase. One of the officers trained in the battalion at this period was J. R. R. Tolkien. On 1 September 1916 the 2nd Reserve battalions were transferred to the Training Reserve (TR) and the battalion was redesignated 15th Training Reserve Bn, still in 3rd Reserve Bde at Brocton. The training staff retained their Lancashire Fusiliers badges. On 4 July 1917 it became 267th (Infantry) Battalion, TR, and by August it had moved to Witham in Essex and joined 218th Brigade in 73rd Division. On 24 October 1917 it transferred to the Leicestershire Regiment as 52nd (Graduated) Battalion. It joined 207th Bde in 69th Division at Clipstone Camp in January 1918, moving to Thoresby Park in April. In the autumn it transferred within 69th Division to 208th Bde at Welbeck. After the war it was converted into 52nd (Service) Bn of the Leicestershires on 8 February 1919 and was eventually disbanded at Kinmel Camp on 17 September 1919.

=== Postwar ===
The SR resumed its old title of Militia in 1921 and then became the Supplementary Reserve in 1924, but almost all militia battalions remained in abeyance after World War I. Until 1939 they continued to appear in the Army List, but they were not activated during World War II and were all formally disbanded in April 1953.

== Commanders ==
The following served as Colonel of the Regiment or later as Honorary Colonel of the regiment:

- Hon Charles James Fox Stanley, former lt-col, Grenadier Guards, appointed 21 February 1855
- Thomas Hale, former captain, 88th Foot, appointed 2 July 1892

The following served as Lieutenant-Colonel Commandant:

- John Edward Madocks, former captain, 13th Light Dragoons, appointed 22 March 1855
- James Ashton, promoted 2 March 1871
- Thomas Hale, promoted 7 November 1885
- Thomas Brindley, promoted 18 July 1892
- Frederick Finch Mackenzie, promoted 20 November 1895

After the battalions were administered separately from 1900:
5th, later 3rd Battalion'
Hon Col;

- Herbert Kitchener, 1st Earl Kitchener, appointed 11 June 1902

Lt-Col:

- Charles L. Robinson, retired major, appointed 30 May 1907
- Herbert R. Cobbett, promoted 6 August 1911, until 31 March 1915
- William Lyle, appointed 1 April 1915, transferred 23 October 1915
- Col Anthony Fane, 13th Earl of Westmorland, formerly 3rd (Reserve) Battalion, Northamptonshire Regiment, appointed 8 December 1915, until Armistice

6th, later 4th Battalion
Hon Col:

- John Campbell, 9th Duke of Argyll, appointed 16 January 1901
- Frederick Charles Romer, CB, CMG, appointed 30 January 1909

Lt-Col:

- Frederick Charles Romer, retired captain, appointed 18 December 1895
- Francis Lee Sanders, appointed 2 August 1908
- James Aspinall Turner, promoted 6 September 1911, to 10 June 1918
- Maj Harold Farnell Watson, temporary, 6 August–10 December 1914
- Edward Usher Bradbridge, 11 June 1918 to Armistice

13th (Reserve) Battalion
Lt-Col:

- Wilmot Foster Elmslie, 10 November 1914 to 20 February 1915
- William Bensley Young, 21 February 1915 to 4 July 1916
- Vincent Randolphe Pigott, 5 July 1916 until transfer to TR

== Uniforms and insignia ==
The uniform of the 7th RLM was Rifle green with black facings in the style of the Rifle Brigade. The badge on the officers' pouch belt was a silver Maltese cross surmounted by a crown; in the centre of the cross was the number 'VII' between the strings of a bugle horn. The ORs' Forage cap badge of 1874–81 had a shield displaying a lion beneath a Fleur-de-lis; suspended from the shield was a bugle horn with a rose between the strings; above and round the shield was a scroll bearing the title 'VII Royal Lancashire Militia'.

When the 7th RLM joined the Lancashire Fusiliers in 1881, it adopted that regiment's scarlet uniform with white facings and its insignia.

== See also ==
- Militia (United Kingdom)
- Special Reserve
- Lancashire Militia
- Lancashire Fusiliers
