= List of Provisional Battalions of the Territorial Force =

When the Territorial Force (TF) was created in 1908 it was a part-time volunteer force intended for home defence when the Regular British Expeditionary Force (BEF) was deployed overseas, although a small number of TF units had volunteered for 'Imperial Service'. With the outbreak of World War I the TF was mobilised on 4 August 1914 and went to its war stations. However, on 10 August the TF was invited to volunteer for overseas service, and the majority of men and units did so. Those who did not volunteer or were unfit for overseas service were separated on 15 August to form the basis for reserve units to train the mass of volunteer recruits coming forward. From 31 August these reserve units were termed '2nd Line', distinguished from their 1st Line parents by a '2/' prefix. In this way duplicate units and formations came into being.

== Provisional units ==
By May 1915 it was decided to prepare the 2nd Line TF units for overseas service, and 3rd Line training units were created to supply reinforcements to the 1st and 2nd Lines. At the same time the remaining home service and unfit personnel were separated and grouped into coast defence brigades, shortly afterwards termed provisional brigades. The provisional infantry battalions were numbered up to 108 (with some gaps in the sequence). Support units (Royal Field Artillery, Royal Engineers, Army Service Corps etc), took the number of the provisional brigade to which they belonged.

The Military Service Act 1916 swept away the home/foreign service distinction, and all TF soldiers became liable for overseas service, if medically fit. The provisional brigades thus became anomalous, and on 1 January 1917 the remaining infantry units became numbered battalions of appropriate regiments.

Provisional Battalion	Formed from	Final designation
Scottish Command
1st (Scottish)	4th, 5th and 6th Bns, Seaforth Highlanders; 4th Bn Cameron Highlanders	Absorbed into 10th Provisional Bn by 1917
2nd (Scottish)	5th, 6th, 7th, 8th Bns and Shetland Companies, Gordon Highlanders	Disbanded 1917
3rd (Scottish)	6th, 7th, 8th and 9th Bns, Argyll and Sutherland Highlanders	16th Bn, Argyll and Sutherland Highlanders
4th (Scottish)	5th and 6th Bns, Black Watch	?Disbanded
5th (Scottish)	4th and 7th Bns, Black Watch; 5th Bn, Argyll and Sutherland Highlanders; 9th Bn, Royal Scots	Disbanded 1917
6th (Scottish)	4th, 5th and 6th Bns, Royal Scots	Disbanded 1917
7th (Scottish)	7th and 8th Bns, Royal Scots	Disbanded 1917
8th (Scottish)	8th Bn, Highland Light Infantry (whole battalion)	Disbanded 1916
9th (Scottish)	5th, 6th, 7th and 9th Bns, Highland Light Infantry	21st Bn, Highland Light Infantry
10th (Scottish)	5th, 6th and 7th Bns, Scottish Rifles	15th Bn, Scottish Rifles
11th (Scottish)	4th and 5th Bns, Royal Scots Fusiliers; 8th Bn, Scottish Rifles	11th Bn, Royal Scots Fusiliers
12th (Scottish)	4th and 5th Bns, King's Own Scottish Borderers	Disbanded 1917
Northern Command
21st (Note: Originally formed as 1st North Coast Defence Battalion.)	4th and 7th Bns, Northumberland Fusiliers	35th Bn, Northumberland Fusiliers
22nd (Note: Originally formed as 2nd North Coast Defence Battalion.)	5th and 6th Bns, Northumberland Fusiliers	36th Bn, Northumberland Fusiliers
23rd (Note: Originally formed as 3rd North Coast Defence Battalion.)	6th, 7th, 8th and 9th Bns Durham Light Infantry	26th Bn Durham Light Infantry
24th	4th and 5th Bns, Yorkshire Regiment	18th Bn, Yorkshire Regiment
25th	4th Bn, East Yorkshire Regiment; 5th Bn, Durham Light Infantry	27th Bn, Durham Light Infantry
26th	5th, 6th, 7th and 8th Bns, West Yorkshire Regiment; 4th and 5th Bns, York and Lancaster Regiment	Disbanded 1916
27th	4th, 5th, 6th and 7th Bns, West Riding Regiment; 4th and 5th Bns, King's Own Yorkshire Light Infantry	Disbanded 1917
28th	4th and 5th Bns, Lincolnshire Regiment; 4th and 5th Bns, Leicestershire Regiment; 5th and 6th Bns, South Staffordshire Regiment	13th Bn, Lincolnshire Regiment
29th	5th, 6th, 7th and 8th Bns, Sherwood Foresters; 5th and 6th Bns, North Staffordshire Regiment	21st Bn, Sherwood Foresters
Western Command
41st	4th and 5th Bns, Royal Lancaster Regiment	12th Bn, Royal Lancaster Regiment
42nd	4th, 5th and 12th Bns, Loyal North Lancashire Regiment	14th Bn, Loyal North Lancashire Regiment
43rd	5th and 6th Bns, Liverpool Regiment	25th Bn, Liverpool Regiment
44th	7th, 8th and 9th Bns, Liverpool Regiment	26th Bn, Liverpool Regiment
45th	6th, 7th and 8th Bns, Lancashire Fusiliers; 5th, 6th, 7th and 10th Bns, Manchester Regiment	28th Bn, Manchester Regiment
46th	4th, 5th, 6th and 7th Bns, Cheshire Regiment	23rd Bn, Cheshire Regiment
47th	4th, 5th, 6th and 7th Bns, Royal Welsh Fusiliers	23rd Bn, Royal Welsh Fusiliers
48th	1st, 2nd and 3rd Bns, Monmouthshire Regiment; 1st Bn, Herefordshire Regiment	4th Bn Monmouthshire Regiment
49th	10th Bn, Liverpool Regiment; 4th and 5th Bns, South Lancashire Regiment	14th Bn, South Lancashire Regiment
50th	4th Bn, Shropshire Light Infantry; Brecknockshire Bn, South Wales Borderers	Disbanded 1916
51st	4th, 5th and 6th Bns, Welsh Regiment	Disbanded 1917
52nd	5th Bn, Lancashire Fusiliers; 4th and 5th Bns, East Lancashire Regiment; 4th and 5th Bns, Border Regiment; 8th and 9th Bns, Manchester Regiment	Disbanded 1916
Eastern Command
61st	4th and 5th Bns, Norfolk Regiment	11th Bn, Norfolk Regiment
62nd	1st Bn Cambridgeshire Regiment; 4th Bn, Northamptonshire Regiment	9th Bn, Northamptonshire Regiment
63rd	7th, 8th, 9th and 10th Bns, Middlesex Regiment	32nd Bn, Middlesex Regiment
64th	4th and 5th Bns, Suffolk Regiment	14th Bn, Suffolk Regiment
65th	4th Bn, Essex Regiment	15th Bn, Essex Regiment
66th	5th (part) and 6th Bns, Essex Regiment	16th Bn, Essex Regiment
67th	5th (part) and 7th Bns, Essex Regiment	17th Bn, Essex Regiment
68th	5th Bn, Bedfordshire Regiment; 1st Bn, Hertfordshire Regiment	11th Bn, Bedfordshire Regiment
69th	4th and 5th Bns Queen's (Royal West Surrey Regiment)	19th Bn, Queen's (Royal West Surrey Regiment)
70th	5th and 6th Bns, East Surrey Regiment	15th Bn, Royal Sussex Regiment
71st	4th and 5th Bns, Buffs (East Kent Regiment); 4th and 5th Bns, Royal West Kent Regiment	Amalgamated with 69th Provisional Bn 5 June 1916
72nd	4th & 5th Bns, Royal Sussex Regiment	Disbanded by 1917
Southern Command
81st	5th, 6th, 7th and 8h Bns, Royal Warwickshire Regiment	18th Bn, Royal Warwickshire Regiment
82nd	4th and 6th Bns, Gloucestershire Regiment; 7th and 8th Bns, Worcestershire Regiment	17th Bn, Gloucestershire Regiment
83rd	5th Bn, Gloucestershire Regiment; 4th and Buckinghamshire Bns, Oxfordshire and Buckinghamshire Light Infantry; 4th Bn, Royal Berkshire Regiment	10th Bn, Oxfordshire and Buckinghamshire Light Infantry
84th (Note: Originally formed as Hampshire Brigade Battalion.)	4th, 5th, 6th, 7th and 8th Bns, Hampshire Regiment	17th Bn, Hampshire Regiment
85th (Note: Originally formed as South-Western Infantry Brigade Composite Battalion.)	4th and 5th Bns, Somerset Light Infantry; 4th Bn, Wiltshire Regiment; 4th Bn, Dorsetshire Regiment	11th Bn, Somerset Light Infantry
86th	4th, 5th and 6th Bns, Devonshire Regiment; 4th and 5th Bns, Duke of Cornwall's Light Infantry	15th Bn, Devonshire Regiment
London District
100th	1st, 2nd, 4th and 7th Bns, London Regiment	29th Bn, London Regiment
101st	3rd, 5th, 6th and 8th Bns, London Regiment	30th Bn, London Regiment
102nd	9th, 10th and 12th Bns, London Regiment	Amalgamated with 100th Provisional Bn to form 29th Bn London Regiment
104th	Honourable Artillery Company Infantry Bn; 14th and 28th Bns, London Regiment	Amalgamated with 101st Provisional Bn
105th	11th, 13th, 15th and 16th Bns, London Regiment	Amalgamated with 107th Provisional Bn to form 31st Bn, London Regiment
106th	19th, 20th and 22nd Bns, London Regiment	Amalgamated with 108th Provisional Bn to form 32nd Bn, London Regiment
107th	17th, 18th and 21st Bns, London Regiment	31st Bn, London Regiment
108th	23rd and 24th Bns, London Regiment	32nd Bn, London Regiment

== See also ==
- List of units of the British Army Territorial Force (1908)
