= 220th Brigade (United Kingdom) =

220th Infantry Brigade
- Active: 9 November 1916–8 April 1918; 1 November 1940-17 November 1944
- Country: United Kingdom
- Branch: British Army
- Type: Infantry Brigade
- Role: Training and Home Defence

220th Brigade was a Home Service formation of the British Army during the First and Second World Wars.

== First World War ==
220 Brigade was raised in late 1916 as part of 73rd Division, which had the dual role of training men for overseas drafts and providing forces for home defence.

=== Composition ===
The following infantry battalions served in 220 Brigade during the war:

- 2/4th Battalion, Yorkshire Regiment, joined 9 November 1916 from 189th (2nd York and Durham) Brigade disbanded 21 December 1917.
- 2/5th Battalion, Yorkshire Regiment, joined 9 November 1916 from 189th (2nd York and Durham) Brigade, disbanded 21 December 1917.
- 17th Battalion, Yorkshire Regiment, formed November 1916, disbanded 5 November 1917.
- 273rd Graduated Battalion, joined by 23 July 1917, became 52nd (Graduated) Battalion, Durham Light Infantry 27 October 1917, went to 206th (2nd Essex) Brigade March 1918.
- 274th Graduated Battalion, joined by 9 July 1917, became 52nd (Graduated) Battalion, Royal Warwickshire Regiment 27 October 1917, went to 205th (2nd Welsh Border) Brigade March 1918

On 21 December 1917 orders were issued to break up 73rd Division. Disbandment began in January 1918 and its last elements disappeared on 8 April 1918.

== Second World War ==
=== Origin ===
A new brigade under the title of 220th Independent Infantry Brigade (Home) was formed for service in the United Kingdom on 1 November 1940, largely from battalions from East Anglian regiments.

=== Service ===
After a brief spell attached to the East Anglian 18th Infantry Division, the 220th Brigade became part of Norfolk County Division on 24 December 1940. On 18 November 1941 the Norfolk County Division became 76th Infantry Division, a low establishment division (with a reduced allotment of equipment) intended for home defence. The 220th Independent Infantry Brigade (Home) was re-designated as the 220th Infantry Brigade.

On 1 September 1944, the 76th Divisional headquarters was disbanded and the 220th Brigade became part of 47th Infantry (Reserve) Division On 27 October 1944 the 47th Division's 141st (5th London) Brigade was disbanded, and on 17 November the 220th Brigade was re-designated 141st Infantry Brigade, but with no London connection.

=== Order of battle ===
The following units served in 220 Brigade:

- On formation (18th Infantry Division) and part of the Norfolk County Division.
  - 23rd Battalion, Royal Fusiliers (until 5 July 1941)
  - 9th Battalion, Royal Norfolk Regiment (until 17 November 1941)
  - 9th Battalion, Bedfordshire and Hertfordshire Regiment (until 17 November 1941)
  - 7th Battalion, Royal Norfolk Regiment (5 November 1940–17 November 1941)
- As part of the 78th Infantry Division
  - 9th Battalion, Royal Norfolk Regiment (18 November 1941–17 December 1942)
  - 9th Battalion, Bedfordshire and Hertfordshire Regiment (18 November 1941–6 September 1942)
  - 7th Battalion, Royal Norfolk Regiment (18 November 1941–13 September 1942)
  - 1/5th Battalion, West Yorkshire Regiment (9 September 1942–27 January 1943)
  - 6th Battalion, Northamptonshire Regiment (13 September 1942–17 November 1943)
  - 18th Battalion, Welch Regiment (13 December 1942–18 November 1943)
  - 6th Battalion, King's Own Yorkshire Light Infantry (16 December 1942–26 October 1943)
  - 5th Battalion, West Yorkshire Regiment (28 January 1943–25 July 1944)
  - 9th (Caernarvonshire and Anglesey) Battalion, Royal Welch Fusiliers (16 October 1943–22 July 1944)
  - 2/6th Battalion, Lancashire Fusiliers (27 October 1943–24 July 1944)
  - 6th Battalion, King's Own Royal Regiment (Lancaster) (19 November 1943–27 July 1944)
  - 8th Battalion, Suffolk Regiment (27 July 1944–31 August 1944)
  - 9th Battalion, Dorset Regiment (8 August 1944–31 August 1944)
  - 6th Battalion, Devonshire Regiment (14 August 1944–31 August 1944)

=== Commanders ===
The following officers commanded 220 Brigade:

- Brig C.M. Clode
- Brig G.F. Ellenberger (from 18 June 1941)
- Brig A.C.T. Evanson (from 10 May 1943)
