= Cavaye =

Cavaye is a surname. Notable people with the surname include:

- Ronald Cavaye, British pianist
- William Frederick Cavaye (1845–1926), British army officer and politician

== See also ==
- Cavayé, masculine given name and surname
