= Charles Ross (British Army officer, born 1864) =

British Army general

Major-General Charles Ross CB DSO
- Born: 10 March 1864
- Died: 21 December 1930 (aged 66); Compton, Hampshire, England
- Burial place: All Saints Churchyard, Compton
- Relatives: Ronald Ross (brother), Campbell Claye Grant Ross (father)
- Military career
- Allegiance: United Kingdom
- Branch: British Army
- Service years: 1883–1917
- Rank: Major-General
- Units: Dorsetshire Regiment; Norfolk Regiment
- Commands: 61st Infantry Brigade; 6th Division; 69th (2nd East Anglian) Division
- Conflicts: Boer War; First World War
- Awards: Companion of the Order of the Bath; Mentioned in dispatches Distinguished Service Order
- Other work: Author

Major-General Charles Ross CB DSO (10 March 1864 – 21 December 1930) was a British Army officer, active during the Boer War and the First World War, where he commanded 6th Division from 1915 to 1917. He was the younger brother of Sir Ronald Ross, who received the 1902 Nobel Prize in Medicine for discovering the method by which malaria was transmitted.

== Early life and military career ==
Ross was born in 1864, the third son of General Sir Campbell Claye Grant Ross. His eldest brother, Ronald, would later become a medical researcher, and was eventually awarded the 1902 Nobel Prize in Medicine for his work on the transmission of malaria.

He was educated at Stubbington, and, after serving as an officer in the 3rd (Militia) Battalion of the Dorsetshire Regiment (later the Dorset Regiment), into which he was commissioned in January 1883, joined the Norfolk Regiment (later the Royal Norfolk Regiment) as a lieutenant in November 1884.

He was attached to the Egyptian Army in 1893 and 1894, and returned to Britain and attended the Staff College, Camberley, from 1897 to 1899.

Shortly after leaving, he was posted to South Africa, following the outbreak of hostilities there, to act as a divisional signalling officer. He was then assigned to intelligence work on the staff, and remained in the country until July 1902, being mentioned in dispatches and awarded the Distinguished Service Order (DSO) for his services in the war.

In 1904, after returning to Britain, he was posted in May to the Royal Military Academy, Woolwich, as an instructor, and was promoted on 12 January 1905 to major. On 9 March was transferred to the Royal Military College, Sandhurst, as the commander of a cadet company. He remained at Sandhurst until January 1908, when he was posted to the Staff College as a deputy assistant adjutant general (DAAG) in succession to John Du Cane; he was well regarded as a lecturer by his students.

He was promoted to colonel in October 1911 and retired from the army in July 1912.

== First World War ==
During the early stages of the First World War, Ross was promoted to the temporary rank of brigadier general in July 1915 and commanded the 20th (Light) Division's 61st Infantry Brigade, which he led on the Western Front.

On 14 November 1915, he was promoted to temporary major general and appointed to command the 6th Division in the place of Lieutenant General Walter Congreve, who had been promoted to command a corps. He commanded the division during the Battle of the Somme, where it was engaged in September and October 1916. His performance as a division commander was mixed, although he managed to hold his command until 18 August 1917, when he was relieved. Whilst commanding the division, he was made a Companion of the Order of the Bath.

He subsequently commanded the 69th (2nd East Anglian) Division in the UK.

== Later life ==
Ross wrote three books stemming from his academic work: Representative Government and War (1904); The Problem of National Defence (1907); and An Outline of the Russo-Japanese War 1904–1905 (1912). He also wrote fiction, publishing at five mystery novels: The Fly-By-Nights; The Haunted Seventh; Every Man's Hand; When the Devil Was Sick; and The Castle Fenham Case.

He married Clara Marion Horton, the widow of an officer in the Royal Artillery, in 1905; they had no children.

== Bibliography ==
- Becke, Major A. F. (1937). Order of Battle of Divisions Part 2B. The 2nd-Line Territorial Force Divisions (57th–69th) with The Home-Service Divisions (71st–73rd) and 74th and 75th Divisions. London: His Majesty's Stationery Office. ISBN 1-871167-00-0.

Military offices
Preceded by Walter Congreve	GOC 6th Division; 1915–1917	Succeeded by Thomas Marden
Preceded by Francis Kelly	GOC 69th (2nd East Anglian) Division; 1917−1918	Succeeded by Robert Fanshawe
