= 206th (2nd Essex) Brigade =

- Active: 1914–1919
- Country: United Kingdom
- Branch: British Army
- Type: Infantry Brigade
- Role: Training and Home Defence
- Part of: 69th (2nd East Anglian) Division

The 206th (2nd Essex) Brigade was a formation of the British Army during World War I. It was raised as a 2nd-Line duplicate of the Essex Brigade of the Territorial Force and formed part of the 69th (2nd East Anglian) Division. It served as a training formation in the United Kingdom without going overseas.

== Recruitment ==
On the outbreak of war, units of the Territorial Force were invited to volunteer for Overseas Service. On 15 August 1914, the War Office issued instructions to separate those men who had signed up for Home Service only, and form these into reserve units. On 31 August, the formation of a reserve or 2nd-Line unit was authorised for each 1st-Line unit where 60 per cent or more of the men had volunteered for Overseas Service. The titles of these 2nd-Line units would be the same as the original, but distinguished by a '2/' prefix. In this way duplicate battalions, brigades and divisions were created, mirroring those TF formations being sent overseas.

The Essex Territorial Association recruited numerous volunteers for the four battalions of the Essex Regiment that constituted the Essex Brigade, but because they were not asked until after they had attested whether they wished to volunteer for Overseas Service, many opted for Home Service. Hence the 2nd-Line battalions filled up more quickly than the 1st-Line. In this way the 2nd Essex Brigade came into existence, forming part of the East Anglian Reserve Division. On 15 August 1915 they were numbered as the 206th (2nd Essex) Brigade (or, more formally, the 206th (2nd/1st Essex) Brigade) and 69th (2nd East Anglian) Division respectively.

== Order of battle ==
The 206th (2nd Essex) Brigade was constituted as follows:

- 2/4th Battalion, Essex Regiment – disbanded 6 December 1915, personnel drafted to 3/4th Bn and left the brigade
- 2/5th Battalion, Essex Regiment – disbanded in March 1918
- 2/6th Battalion, Essex Regiment – disbanded in January 1918
- 2/7th Battalion, Essex Regiment – broken up on 10 October 1917 to provide drafts to 67th (2nd Home Counties) Division
- 4/1st Battalion, Hertfordshire Regiment – duplicate of 2/1st Bn, brought up to strength with drafts from 3/1st Bn and joined the brigade to replace 2/4th Essex
- 237th Battalion – Graduated Battalion of the Training Reserve, joined between 21 July and 11 October 1917
- 238th Battalion – Graduated Battalion of the Training Reserve, joined between 21 July and 11 October 1917
- 51st Battalion, Northumberland Fusiliers (Graduated) – redesignation of 238 Bn from 27 October 1917
- 51st Battalion, Rifle Brigade (Graduated) – redesignation of 237 Bn from 27 October 1917; transferred to 67th Division in February 1918
- 52nd (Graduated) Battalion, Northumberland Fusiliers – joined on 5 March 1918
- 51st (Graduated) Battalion, Durham Light Infantry – joined on 15 January 1918 from 215th Brigade, 72nd Division
- 52nd (Graduated) Battalion, Durham Light Infantry – joined on 15 January 1918 from 220th Brigade, 73rd Division

== Service ==
By December 1914 the East Anglian Reserve Division concentrated around Peterborough and Stamford, Lincolnshire. Training was impeded by the lack of arms and equipment, the constant drain of providing drafts to the 1st-Line battalions (the Essex Brigade was serving at Gallipoli), and the decision to transfer the Home Service men to Provisional Battalions (forming the 66th and 67th Provisional Bns in 3rd Provisional Brigade). Eventually, the men were issued with .256-in Japanese Ariska rifles for training.

In the summer of 1915, the 69th Division went under canvas in camp round Thetford. On 17 August the 206th Brigade was detached to Essex to work on the London Defences at Rayleigh, Billericay, Hadleigh and Brentwood. The brigade was relieved from this duty by 208th (2nd Norfolk and Suffolk) Brigade in September. In October the establishment strength of the 2nd-Line battalions was reduced to 23 officers and 600 men, the surplus being transferred to new 3rd-Line battalions, which had been authorised in May 1915 and were intended to provide drafts to both the 1st and 2nd Line. In November the men finally received Lee–Enfield rifles and were able to return the obsolete Japanese rifles to store.

Whilst at Thetford, the division had formed part of First Army in Central Force. In June 1916 it moved to Harrogate as part of Local Forces in Northern Command. Here the battalions were brought up to full strength with drafts of Derby Scheme men, and thought that they were going to be sent overseas. However, this never happened, and they continued to send drafts to the 1st Line serving in Egypt. The camps around Harrogate were broken up in October and 206 Bde went into winter quarters round Doncaster.

In early May 1917, 69th Division moved to the Retford area, with 206 Bde going under canvas at Welbeck. This camp was maintained until winter set in, when the brigade moved to County Durham, being stationed at Middlesbrough, Barnard Castle, Durham and Stockton-on-Tees. During the winter the brigades of 69th Division were completely reorganised, with the 2nd-Line TF battalions being replaced by Graduated Battalions of the Training Reserve (in the case of 206 Bde these were locally recruited battalions of the Northumberland Fusiliers and Durham Light Infantry). The division and brigades thereby lost their local associations, and titles like 'East Anglian' and 'Essex' were dropped from 1 January 1918.

At the end of the winter, 206 Bde moved to Guisborough and Catterick, where it remained for the rest of the war as a training formation. After the Armistice with Germany the brigade continued at nearly full strength for several months, until demobilisation began in earnest in March 1919, when the brigade was disbanded.

== World War II ==
A new 206th Brigade was raised in 1940 as an independent Home Defence formation. This had no connection with the 2nd Essex Brigade, though coincidentally it was formed of battalions of the Northumberland Fusiliers and Durham Light Infantry, as with 206 Bde of 1918.

== Commanders ==
The following officers commanded 206 Bde during its existence:

- Col A.G. Watson, appointed 9 January 1915
- Lt-Col G. Downing, appointed 18 March 1916 (promoted to Brig-Gen 7 July 1916)
- Brig-Gen C. Cunliffe-Owen, appointed 7 November 1917.

== Online sources ==
- The Long, Long Trail
- The Regimental Warpath 1914–1918
