= Cavayé =

Cavayé can be both a masculine given name and a surname. Notable people with the name include:

- Cavayé Yéguié Djibril (1940–2026), Cameroonian parliamentarian
- Fred Cavayé, French director and screenwriter

== See also ==
- Cavaye, surname
