= Francis Kelly (British Army officer) =

British Army general

Major-General Francis Kelly CB CMG
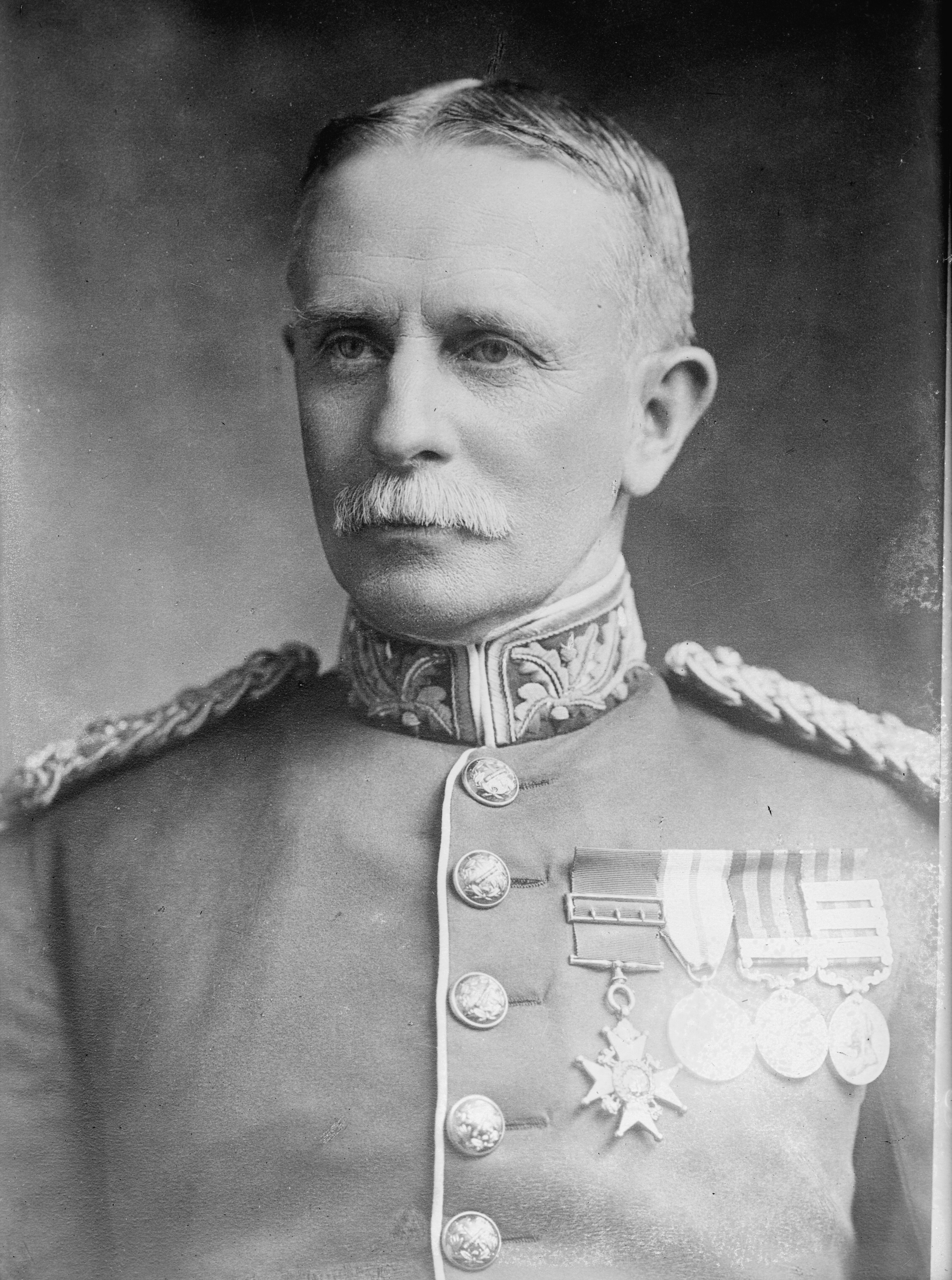
- Kelly in 1916
- Born: 26 July 1859; Clifton, Bristol
- Died: 18 March 1937 (aged 77); Camberley, Surrey
- Burial place: Rochester Cathedral
- Military career
- Allegiance: United Kingdom
- Branch: British Army
- Rank: Major-General
- Commands: Karachi Brigade; Ahmednagar Brigade; Commander of British Troops in South China; 69th (2nd East Anglian) Division
- Conflicts: World War I
- Awards: Companion of the Order of the Bath; Companion of the Order of St Michael and St George

Major-General Francis Henry Kelly CB CMG (26 July 1859 – 18 March 1937) was Commander of British Troops in South China.

== Military career ==
Kelly was commissioned into the Royal Engineers as a lieutenant on 6 April 1879.

He took part in the Burma expedition in 1885, was promoted to captain on 1 April 1889, and then went to the North West Frontier in India in 1897 where he participated in the Tirah Campaign, during which he was promoted to major on 1 October 1897. Following the campaign he received a brevet promotion to lieutenant colonel on 20 May 1898.

He was appointed temporary assistant adjutant general in Quetta District on 23 June 1900 (while the actual A.A.G. served in the Boxer Rebellion in China), serving as such for several years. He was promoted to the substantive rank of colonel on 9 September 1902. He was further appointed commander of the Karachi Brigade in 1905 and commander of the Ahmednagar Brigade on 7 February 1907 and was granted the temporary rank of brigadier general while employed in this role. After that he was promoted to major general on 4 December 1909.

He became commander of British Troops in South China on 12 June 1913, taking over from Major General Charles Anderson.

He was general officer commanding (GOC) of the 69th (2nd East Anglian) Division in November 1915 during the First World War before retiring from the army on 2 October 1918.

After the war he became a regional director at the Ministry of Pensions. He ceased to belong to the Reserve of Officers on 26 July 1926.

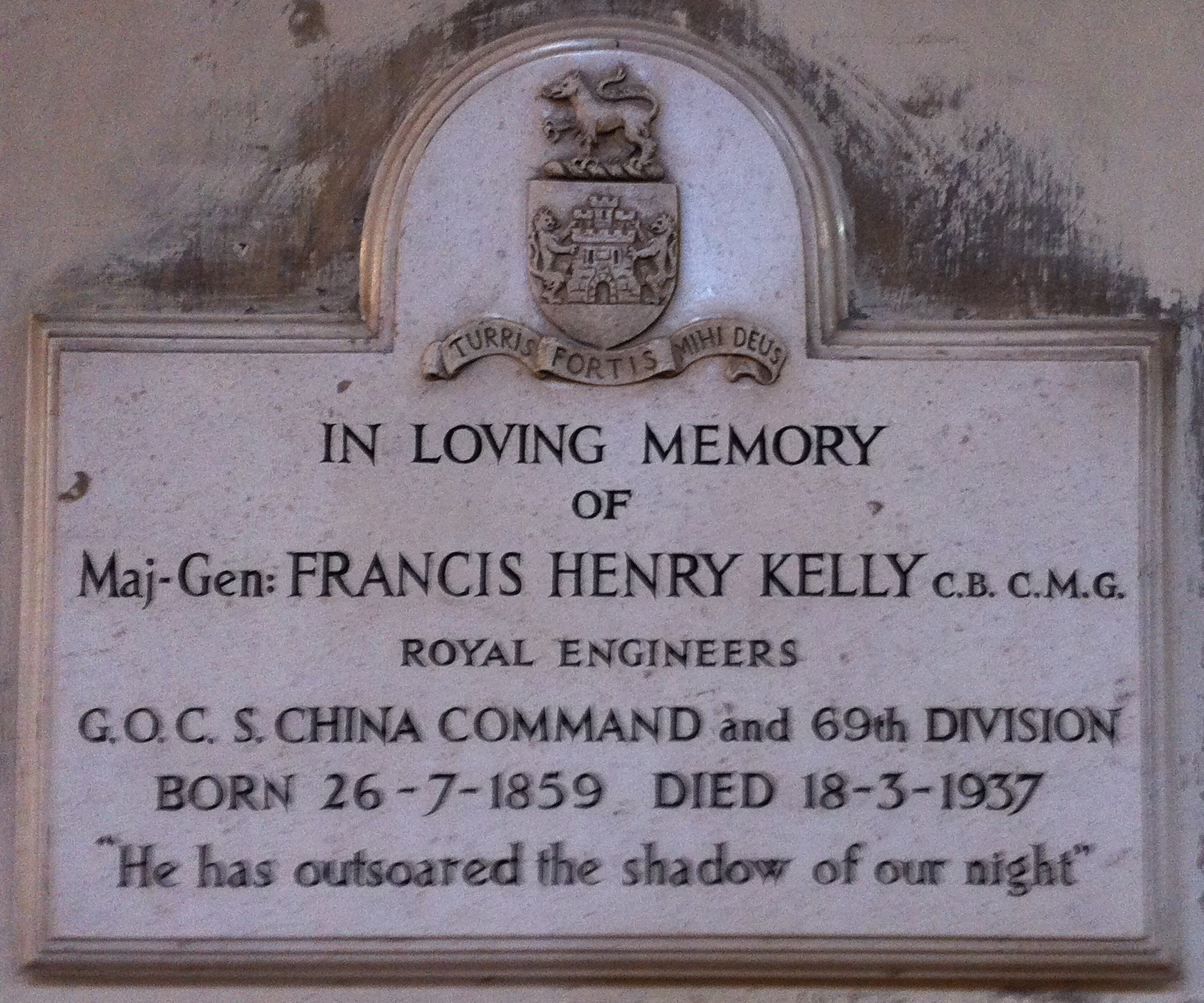
Memorial in Rochester Cathedral

Military offices
Preceded by Sir Charles Anderson	Commander of British Troops in South China; 1913–1915	Succeeded by Francis Ventris
Preceded by William Cavaye	GOC 69th (2nd East Anglian) Division; 1915−1917	Succeeded by Charles Ross
