= 6th Royal Lancashire Militia =

Auxiliary unit of the British Army

6th Royal Lancashire Militia 3rd & 4th Bns Manchester Regiment
- Active: 8 January 1855–April 1953
- Country: United Kingdom
- Branch: Militia/Special Reserve
- Role: Infantry
- Size: 1–2 Battalions
- Garrison/HQ: Ladysmith Barracks, Ashton-under-Lyne
- Engagements: Second Boer War

The 6th Royal Lancashire Militia (6th RLM) was an auxiliary (Note: It is incorrect to describe the British Militia as 'irregular': throughout their history they were equipped and trained exactly like the line regiments of the regular army, and once embodied in time of war they were fulltime professional soldiers for the duration of their enlistment.) regiment raised in the county of Lancashire in North West England just before the Crimean War. It later became part of the Manchester Regiment. Although primarily intended for home defence, its battalions saw active service during the Second Boer War. Following conversion to the Special Reserve (SR) under the Haldane Reforms it supplied reinforcements to the fighting battalions during World War I. After a shadowy postwar existence the unit was finally disbanded in 1953.

== Background ==
The universal obligation to military service in the Shire levy was long established in England and its legal basis was updated by two acts of 1557 (4 & 5 Ph. & M. cc. 2 and 3) which placed selected men, the 'trained bands', under the command of Lords Lieutenant appointed by the monarch. This is seen as the starting date for the organised county militia in England. It was an important element in the country's defence at the time of the Spanish Armada in the 1580s, and control of the militia was one of the areas of dispute between King Charles I and Parliament that led to the English Civil War. The English Militia was re-established under local control in 1662 after the Restoration of the monarchy, and the Lancashire Militia fought in King William III's campaign in Ireland in 1690–91, and against the Jacobite Risings in 1715 and 1745. However, between periods of national emergency the militia was regularly allowed to decline.

Under threat of French invasion during the Seven Years' War a series of Militia Acts from 1757 reorganised the county militia regiments, the men being conscripted by means of parish ballots (paid substitutes were permitted) to serve for three years. In peacetime they assembled for 28 days' annual training. In 1760 Lancashire's quota was one regiment, which received the title Royal Lancashire Militia in 1761. These reformed regiments were 'embodied' for permanent service in home defence during the Seven Years' War, the War of American Independence, the French Revolutionary War and the Napoleonic Wars. By 1800 the Royal Lancashire Militia had expanded to three regiments. During the French wars, the militia were embodied for a whole generation, and became regiments of full-time professional soldiers (though restricted to service in the British Isles), which the regular army increasingly saw as a prime source of recruits. They served in coast defences, manning garrisons, guarding prisoners of war, and for internal security, such as the time of the Luddite disturbances. However, in the years of the long peace after the Battle of Waterloo the militia was allowed to decline again, the ballot and annual training being suspended.

== 6th Royal Lancashire Militia ==
The long-standing Militia of the United Kingdom was revived by the Militia Act 1852, enacted during a period of international tension. As before, units were raised and administered on a county basis, and filled by voluntary enlistment (although conscription by means of the militia ballot might be used if the counties failed to meet their quotas). Training was for 56 days on enlistment, then for 21–28 days per year, during which the men received full army pay. Under the Act, militia units could be embodied by Royal Proclamation for full-time service in three circumstances:

1. 'Whenever a state of war exists between Her Majesty and any foreign power'.
2. 'In all cases of invasion or upon imminent danger thereof'.
3. 'In all cases of rebellion or insurrection'.

With the threat of war against Russia, the three Lancashire regiments were ordered to recruit up to their full establishments of 1200 men. When war broke out in 1854 an expeditionary force was sent to the Crimea and the militia were embodied for home defence and service in overseas garrisons. Additional infantry and artillery militia regiments were also formed in Lancashire at this time including the 6th Lancashire Militia raised at Ashton-under-Lyne at the end of 1854. On 8 January 1855 the Lord Lieutenant of Lancashire, the Earl of Sefton, appointed the Hon Edward Bootle-Wilbraham (second son of Edward Bootle-Wilbraham, 1st Baron Skelmersdale), formerly of the Coldstream Guards, as colonel of the new regiment, with Col John Henry Pringle (also of the Coldstream Guards) as Lieutenant-Colonel Commandant and Thomas Edward Wilbraham (younger son of George Wilbraham of Delamere Park and former captain in the 39th Foot) as the senior major. Soon there were seven militia infantry regiments in Lancashire, each with a defined recruiting area: the 6th at Ashton recruited from the wider Manchester area.

The regiment was embodied for fulltime service on 17 May 1855 and disembodied during 1856. Thereafter the militia regularly carried out their peacetime annual training. In July 1860 the regiment received the 'Royal' title held by the senior Lancashire regiments, becoming the 6th Royal Lancashire Militia (6th RLM). In the early 1860s the regiment established itself at Salford. The Militia Reserve introduced in 1867 consisted of present and former militiamen who undertook to serve overseas in case of war.

=== Cardwell reforms ===
Under the 'Localisation of the Forces' scheme introduced by the Cardwell Reforms of 1872, Militia regiments were brigaded with regular and Volunteer battalions in a regimental district sharing a permanent depot at a suitable county town. Seven double-battalion or paired single-battalion regular regiments were assigned to Lancashire, and each was linked with one of the militia regiments. The militia now came under the War Office rather than their county lords lieutenant, and officers' commissions were signed by the Queen.

The 6th RLM was linked with the 63rd (West Suffolk) and 96th Regiments of Foot in Sub-District No 16 (Lancashire), with the depot at Wellington Barracks, Ashton-under-Lyne; the 6th RLM returned to Ashton from Salford by 1880. In line with these arrangements, the 6th RLM formed a 2nd Battalion on 20 September 1876, although the cadre around which it was formed was actually provided by the 1st RLM. Although often referred to as brigades, the regimental districts were purely administrative organisations, but in a continuation of the Cardwell Reforms a mobilisation scheme began to appear in the Army List from December 1875. This assigned regular and militia units to places in an order of battle of corps, divisions and brigades for the 'Active Army', even though these formations were entirely theoretical, with no staff or services assigned. The 5th, 6th and 7th Royal Lancashire Militia formed 2nd Brigade of 3rd Division, VIII Corps at Melrose, Scottish Borders.

== 3rd and 4th Battalions, Manchester Regiment ==
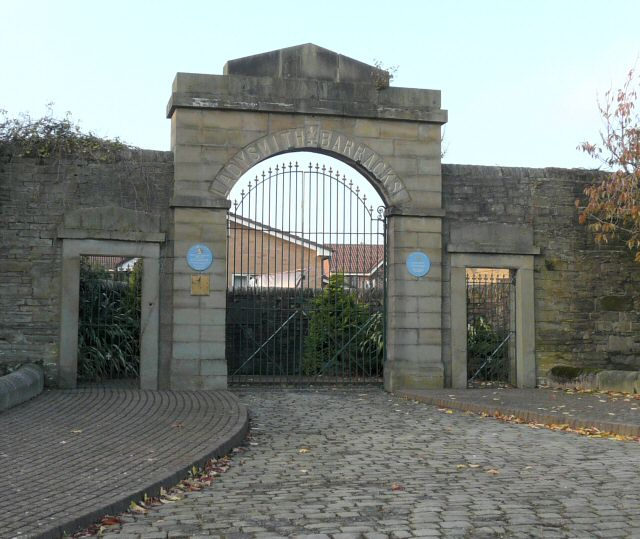
The entrance to Ladysmith Barracks today

The Childers Reforms completed the Cardwell process by incorporating the militia battalions into the expanded county regiments. On 1 July 1881 the 63rd and 96th Foot became the 1st and 2nd Battalions of the Manchester Regiment at Ashton with the 6th Royal Lancashire Militia as its 3rd and 4th Battalions (though they continued to be administered as a double-battalion regiment until 1 August 1900).

=== Second Boer War ===
After the disasters of Black Week at the start of the Second Boer War in December 1899, most of the regular army was sent to South Africa. Militia units were embodied to replace them for home defence and a number volunteered for active service or to garrison overseas stations. Both regular battalions of the Manchesters were deployed to South Africa and the militia reservists went out as reinforcements. In February 1900 the Manchesters formed two additional regular battalions, which took the 3rd and 4th places, causing the militia to be renumbered 5th and 6th Battalions.

The 5th Bn was embodied on 3 May 1900 and served at Aldershot until 20 October when it returned to Ashton to be disembodied. It was embodied again from 6 May 1901 and having volunteered for overseas service it went to Aldershot again to complete its training. It embarked from Southampton on 17 June aboard the Bavarian with a strength of 26 officers and 780 other ranks (ORs) under the command of Lt-Col Henry Crosbie.

During the voyage the battalion exchanged its scarlet uniforms for Khaki. It landed at Cape Town on 10 July 1901 and proceeded to Winburg in the Orange River Colony, where it was employed to defend the town (A, B, C, D, G and H Companies) and the railway towards Smaldeel (E Company). The Boers were being pursued by British columns and the battalion repulsed Boer attempts to cross the line. On 8 April 1902 the defences were reorganised and the battalion took over defence of the railway line towards Kroonstad, with D Company at Brandfort. The battalion remained in the Smaldeel area until the signing of the Treaty of Vereeniging on 31 May 1902. On 9 July it boarded the SS Briton at Cape Town and arrived back at the depot at Ashton to disembody on 31 July. During its service the battalion lost one officer and 21 ORs killed or died of disease.

The 6th Bn had also been embodied for duty at home from 4 May to 18 October 1900. It was re-embodied for service in South Africa on 6 January 1902, embarking for Cape Town on 13 February with a strength of 20 officers and 645 ORs under Col Charles Leyden. After arrival it entrained on 6 March for Norvalspont and took over the blockhouse line between Jagersfontein and Achterlong stations, a distance of 36 miles (58 km), together with the chain of forts and sangars round the bridge at Norvalspont. On 14 April the battalion extended to take over the line as far as Tweedale, and provided a garrison at Colesberg to guard and escort Boer prisoners. The battalion returned home on 4 September to be disembodied on 30 September 1902, having lost 8 ORs.

The battalions were both awarded Battle Honours: South Africa 1901–02 for 5th Bn and South Africa 1902 for 6th Bn. The participants received the Queen's South Africa Medal with clasps for 'Cape Colony', 'Orange Free State' and 'South Africa' 1901 and 1902 as appropriate.

Wellington Barracks at Ashton was renamed Ladysmith Barracks after the Boer War. In 1906 the regular 3rd and 4th Manchesters were disbanded and the 5th and 6th militia battalions reverted to their former numbers.

== Special Reserve ==
After the Boer War, the future of the Militia was called into question. There were moves to reform the Auxiliary Forces (Militia, Yeomanry and Volunteers) to take their place in the six army corps proposed by St John Brodrick as Secretary of State for War. However, little of Brodrick's scheme was carried out.

Under the sweeping Haldane Reforms of 1908, the Militia was replaced by the Special Reserve, a semi-professional force similar to the previous Militia Reserve, whose role was to provide reinforcement drafts for regular units serving overseas in wartime. The battalion became the 3rd (Reserve) Battalion, Prince of Wales's Volunteers (South Lancashire Regiment), on 27 July 1908.

The two militia battalions of the Manchester Regiment became the 3rd (Reserve) and 4th (Extra Reserve) Battalions on 9 August 1908.

== World War I ==
=== 3rd & 4th Battalions ===
The Special Reserve was embodied on the outbreak of World War I on 4 August 1914 and the 3rd and 4th Manchesters proceeded from Ashton to their war station in the Humber Garrison. By October the 3rd was stationed at Cleethorpes and the 4th at Riby. They carried out the dual tasks of garrison duties and preparing reinforcement drafts of regular reservists, special reservists, recruits and returning wounded for the two regular battalions, the 1st serving in Mesopotamia and Palestine, the 2nd on the Western Front.

After Lord Kitchener issued his call for volunteers in August 1914, the battalions of the 1st, 2nd and 3rd New Armies ('K1', 'K2' and 'K3' of 'Kitchener's Army') were quickly formed at the regimental depots. The SR battalions also swelled with new recruits and were soon well above their establishment strength. On 8 October 1914 each SR battalion was ordered to use the surplus to form a service battalion of the 4th New Army ('K4'). Accordingly, the 3rd (Reserve) Bn formed the 14th (Service) Bn (see below). 4th (Extra Reserve) Bn was intended to form a 15th Bn, but the order was cancelled for most Extra Reserve battalions on 25 October, and no 15th Manchesters was ever formed.

The two SR battalions remained on the Lincolnshire coast in the Humber Defences for the rest of the war, the 3rd Bn at Cleethorpes while the 4th was at Riby, Tetney and Grimsby. During a raid by the German Zeppelin LZ 64 on the night of 31 March/1 April 1916, 29 soldiers of the 3rd Manchesters were killed and 53 were wounded when a bomb hit a chapel at Cleethorpes being used as a billet. (Note: Another account attributes the raid to Zeppelin LZ 61 (L 21) and gives the casualties as 31 killed.)

After the war the 4th Bn was disembodied on 16 April 1919, and the 3rd Bn on 10 July 1919 once the remaining personnel had been drafted to the 1st Bn.

=== 14th (Reserve) Battalion ===
In October 1914, 14th (Service) Bn was already forming at Lichfield as a K3 battalion intended for 66th Brigade of 22nd Division. It was replaced in that brigade by 13th (Service) Bn, Manchesters, and on 19 November it was converted to a K4 battalion made up from the surplus personnel of 3rd (Reserve) Bn. It was now assigned to 91st Brigade of 30th Division and began training for active service. On 10 April 1915 the War Office decided to convert the K4 battalions into 2nd Reserve units, providing drafts for the K1–K3 battalions in the same way that the SR was doing for the Regular battalions. The Manchester battalion became 13th (Reserve) Bn, remaining at Lichfield in 3rd Reserve Brigade, where it trained drafts for the 11th, 12th and 13th (Service) Bns. In January 1916 it moved to Brocton on Cannock Chase. On 1 September 1916 the 2nd Reserve battalions were transferred to the Training Reserve (TR) and the battalion was redesignated 14th Training Reserve Bn, still in 3rd Reserve Bde at Brocton. The training staff retained their Manchesters badges. On 1 September 1917 the battalion became 278th (Infantry) Battalion, TR, and it moved to Canterbury in Kent to join 200th Brigade in 67th Division. On 27 October 1917 it transferred to the Sherwood Foresters as 52nd (Graduated) Battalion. By January 1918 it was stationed at Willsborough, near Ashford, Kent.The following month it transferred to 207th Bde in 69th Division at Clipstone Camp, moving to 208th Bde in 69th Division in April. In May 1918 it moved to Welbeck, where it remained for the rest of the war. After the war it was converted into 52nd (Service) Bn of the Sherwood Foresters on 8 February 1919 and was eventually disbanded at Dollymount in Ireland on 31 March 1920.

=== Postwar ===
The SR resumed its old title of Militia in 1921 and then became the Supplementary Reserve in 1924, but almost all militia battalions remained in abeyance after World War I. Until 1939 they continued to appear in the Army List, but they were not activated during World War II and were all formally disbanded in April 1953.

== Commanders ==
The following served as Colonel of the Regiment or later as honorary colonel of the regiment:

- Hon Edward Bootle Wilbraham, appointed 8 January 1855
- John H. Chambers, former CO, appointed Hon Col 25 April 1888

The following served as Lieutenant-Colonel Commandant

- Col John Henry Pringle, appointed 8 January 1855
- Thomas Edward Wilbraham, promoted 25 May 1861
- John H. Chambers, former captain, 46th Foot, promoted 20 September 1876
- Henry Garland-Matthews, former ensign, 44th Foot, promoted 27 June 1883
- Thomas Pery Powell, former lieutenant, 83rd Foot, promoted 2 September 1893
- Charles D. Leyden, promoted (4th, later 6th Bn) 31 July 1896

The following served as second Lt-Col:

- John Copley Wray, appointed (2nd Bn) 9 July 1879
- Thomas Pery Powell, appointed 6 October 1888
- Augustus Graham P. Foley, promoted 23 September 1893
- J.B. Irving, appointed (3rd Bn) 1 August 1896
- William J. Bosworth, appointed (5th Bn) 4 November 1899

After the battalions were administered separately from 1900:
5th, later 3rd Battalion
Hon Col:

- Lt-Gen Sir Ian Hamilton, appointed 24 June 1905

Lt-Col:

- Henry Crosbie, retired major, appointed 5 December 1900
- H.K. Oram, promoted 8 August 1912
- C.M. Thornycroft, CBE, DSO, retired captain, promoted 26 August 1917

6th, later 4th Battalion
Hon Col:

- Edward Stanley, 17th Earl of Derby, appointed 24 December 1902

Lt-Col:

- Herbert Alfred Johnson, promoted 19 May 1905
- J.H.M. Jebb, DSO, retired major, appointed 19 May 1913

== Heritage & ceremonial ==
=== Uniforms & insignia ===
The uniform of the Royal Lancashire Militia was scarlet with the blue facings appropriate to 'Royal' regiments.

The badge of the 6th RLM was the Red Rose of Lancaster: on the buttons of the original coatee it was displayed beneath a crown and above the numeral 'VI', with the title 'Royal Lancashire' round the edge. When the tunic replaced the coatee after the Crimean War the 'VI' was changed to 'Sixth'. The officers' shako plate of 1869–78 and helmet plate of 1878–81 used the rose, in red and green enamel, as the centre badge. The officers' waistbelt plate of 1855–81 was of the universal pattern with the Royal cypher ('VR') and crown within a circle inscribed '6th Royal Lancashire Militia'.

When the 6th RLM joined the Manchesters in 1881, it adopted that regiment's white facings and insignia.

=== Memorial ===
There is a brass memorial plaque in St Michael and All Angels' Church, Ashton-under-Lyne, listing the 31 NCOs and men of 3rd Bn Manchesters killed in the Zeppelin raid on Cleethorpes on 1 April 1916. It was unveiled on 13 October 1918.

== See also ==
- Militia (United Kingdom)
- Special Reserve
- Lancashire Militia
- Manchester Regiment
