= 207th (2nd East Midland) Brigade =

- Active: 1914–1919
- Country: United Kingdom
- Branch: British Army
- Type: Infantry Brigade
- Role: Training and Home Defence
- Part of: 69th (2nd East Anglian) Division

Commanders
- Notable commanders: Col Hon A.E. Dalzel

The 207th (2nd East Midland) Brigade was a formation of the British Army during World War I. It was raised as a 2nd-Line duplicate of the 162nd (East Midland) Brigade of the Territorial Force and formed part of the 69th (2nd East Anglian) Division. It served as a training formation in the United Kingdom without going overseas.

== Recruitment ==
On the outbreak of war, units of the Territorial Force were invited to volunteer for Overseas Service. On 15 August 1914, the War Office issued instructions to separate those men who had signed up for Home Service only, and form these into reserve units. On 31 August, the formation of a reserve or 2nd-Line unit was authorised for each 1st-Line unit where 60 per cent or more of the men had volunteered for Overseas Service. The titles of these 2nd-Line units would be the same as the original, but distinguished by a '2/' prefix. In this way duplicate battalions, brigades and divisions were created, mirroring those TF formations being sent overseas.

The 2nd East Midland Brigade came into existence in January 1915, forming part of the East Anglian Reserve Division. On 15 August 1915 they were numbered as the 207th (2nd East Midland) Brigade (or, more formally, the 206th (2nd/1st East Midland) Brigade) and 69th (2nd East Anglian) Division respectively.

== Order of battle ==
The 207th (2nd Essex) Brigade was constituted as follows:

- 2/5th Battalion, Bedfordshire Regiment – disbanded 18 March 1918
- 2/4th Battalion, Northamptonshire Regiment – disbanded in March 1918 and its remaining personnel posted to the 4th Reserve Bn.
- 2/1st Battalion, Hertfordshire Regiment – disbanded 20 September 1917
- 2/1st Battalion, Cambridgeshire Regiment – transferred to 67th (2nd Home Counties) Division on 8 October 1917.
- 241st Battalion – Graduated Battalion of the Training Reserve, joined between 21 July and 11 October 1917
- 242nd Battalion – Graduated Battalion of the Training Reserve, joined between 21 July and 11 October 1917
- 51st (Graduated) Battalion, West Yorkshire Regiment – redesignation of 242 Bn from 27 October 1917
- 52nd (Graduated) Battalion, West Yorkshire Regiment – joined 23 February 1918
- 52nd (Graduated) Battalion, Rifle Brigade – redesignation of 241 Bn from 27 October 1917; transferred to 67th Division in February 1918
- 51st (Graduated) Battalion, Leicestershire Regiment – joined 15 January 1918 from 72nd Division; later to 208th Brigade, 69th Division
- 52nd (Graduated) Battalion, Leicestershire Regiment – joined 17 January 1918 from 72nd Division; later to 208th Brigade, 69th Division
- 52nd (Graduated) Battalion, Sherwood Foresters – joined 23 February 1918 from 67th Division; later to 208th Brigade, 69th Division
- 51st (Graduated) Battalion, King's Own Yorkshire Light Infantry – joined from 208th Brigade, 69th Division
- 52nd (Graduated) Battalion, King's Own Yorkshire Light Infantry – joined from 208th Brigade, 69th Division

== Service ==
By December 1914 the East Anglian Reserve Division concentrated around Thetford in Norfolk in early 1915. Training was impeded by the lack of arms and equipment and the constant drain of providing drafts to the 1st-Line battalions (the 1st East Midland Brigade was serving at Gallipoli). Eventually, the men were issued with .256-in Japanese Ariska rifles for training.

In October the establishment strength of the 2nd-Line battalions was reduced to 23 officers and 600 men, the surplus being transferred to new 3rd-Line battalions, which had been authorised in May 1915 and were intended to provide drafts to both the 1st and 2nd Line. In November the men finally received Lee–Enfield rifles and were able to return the obsolete Japanese rifles to store.

Whilst at Thetford, the division had formed part of First Army in Central Force. In June 1916 it moved to Harrogate as part of Local Forces in Northern Command. The camps around Harrogate were broken up in October and 207 Bde went into winter billets.

In early May 1917, 69th Division moved to the Retford area, with 207 Bde going under canvas at Carburton. This camp was maintained until winter set in, when the brigade moved to Clipston, Nottinghamshire. During the winter the brigades of 69th Division were completely reorganised, with the 2nd-Line TF battalions being replaced by Graduated Battalions of the Training Reserve. The division and brigades thereby lost their local associations, and titles like 'East Anglian' and 'East Midlands' were dropped from 1 January 1918.

At the end of the winter, 206 Bde moved to Thoresby Hall, later returning to Clipston, and remained a training formation for the rest of the war. After the Armistice with Germany the brigade continued at nearly full strength for several months, until demobilisation began in earnest in March 1919, when the brigade was disbanded.

== World War II ==
A new 207th Brigade was raised in 1940 as an independent Home Defence formation. This had no connection with the 2nd East Midlands Brigade.

== Commanders ==
The following officers commanded 207 Bde during its existence:

- Col Hon A.E. Dalzel, appointed 18 January 1915
- Col M.L. MacEwan, appointed 21 May 1916 (promoted to Brig-Gen 7 July 1916)
- Brig-Gen R.M. Ovens, appointed 29 August 1918.

== See also ==
- 162nd (East Midland) Brigade for the 1st Line parent

== Online sources ==
- The Long, Long Trail
