= 73rd Division (United Kingdom) =

- Active: November 1916 – April 1918
- Country: United Kingdom
- Branch: British Army
- Type: Infantry
- Role: Home Defence and training

Commanders
- Notable commanders: Major-General Hon. C.E. Bingham; Major-General H.G. Ruggles-Brise

73rd Division was a short-lived infantry division of the British Army during World War I. It served in Home Forces and never went overseas.

== Home Service ==
On the outbreak of World War I the Territorial Force (TF) immediately mobilised for home defence, but shortly afterwards (31 August 1914), its units were authorised to raise 2nd battalions formed from those men who had not volunteered for, or were not fit for, overseas service, together with new volunteers, while the 1st Line went overseas to supplement the Regulars. Early in 1915 the 2nd Line TF battalions were also raised to full strength to form new divisions, and began to form Reserve (3rd Line) units to supply drafts. The remaining Home Service men were separated out in May 1915 to form brigades of Coast Defence Battalions (termed Provisional Battalions from June 1915).

=== 9th Provisional Brigade ===
9th Provisional Brigade was formed in East Kent mainly from details of local units and infantry from Lancashire. It had the following composition:

- 9th Provisional Yeomanry Squadron formed at Margate on 14 September 1915 from detachments of the 2/1st South Western Mounted Brigade and the Royal East Kent Mounted Rifles and was initially stationed at Whitstable.
- 9th Provisional Cyclist Company formed at Herne Bay on 8 September 1915 from two platoons of Home Service men (64) drawn from 1/1st and 2/1st Kent Cyclist Battalions, the remainder (113 men) from 1/6th (Cyclist) Battalion, Royal Sussex Regiment; it was temporarily attached to 42nd Provisional Battalion.
- 9th Provisional Battery and Ammunition Column Royal Field Artillery formed at Hastings on 9 September 1915 and shortly afterwards moved to Herne Bay; it was equipped with four French 90 mm field guns.
- 9th Provisional Brigade Ammunition Column RFA
- 9th Provisional Field Company, Royal Engineers
- 9th Provisional Signal Section, Royal Engineers
- 41st Provisional Battalion from home service details of the King's Own (Royal Lancaster Regiment).
- 42nd Provisional Battalion formed on 1 September 1915 at Herne Bay from home service details of the 2/4th, 3/4th, 2/5th and 3/5th Battalions of the Loyal North Lancashire Regiment.
- 44th Provisional Battalion formed on 1 September 1915 from home service details of 7th, 8th and 9th Battalions of the King's (Liverpool) Regiment and stationed in Ramsgate, Broadstairs and Sandwich.
- 45th Provisional Battalion formed from home service details of the 5th, 6th, 7th and 10th Battalions, Manchester Regiment, and 6th, 7th and 8th Battalions, Lancashire Fusiliers.
- 9th Provisional Field Ambulance Royal Army Medical Corps, formed at Ramsgate on 19 September 1915 from the home service details of the 2/1st, 2/2nd and 2/3rd Home Counties Field Ambulances.
- 9th Provisional Brigade Train Army Service Corps, from home service details from Middlesex and Surrey.

A number of men on the strength of these units were absent on civil employment such as munitions work.

In the autumn of 1915 the brigade was under the command of 57th (2nd West Lancashire) Division in Second Army of Central Force. By July 1916 the brigade was under the control of Southern Army of Home Forces, with its battalions billeted as follows:

- Brigade Headquarters: Margate
- 41st Provisional Bn: Westgate-on-Sea
- 42nd Provisional Bn: Broadstairs
- 44th Provisional Bn: Ramsgate
- 45th Provisional Bn: Margate

== 73rd Division formed ==
Late in 1916 the War Office decided to form three new home-service divisions; 73rd was the last of these, assembling at Blackpool in November. The division was based on 9th Provisional Bde, which moved from Margate and provided four infantry battalions and many of the support units. (On 1 January 1917 these all received new designations and numbers.) In addition, 189th (2nd York and Durham) Brigade, left over after the earlier disbandment of 63rd (2nd Northumbrian) Division, provided other components. Personnel to help form the other five artillery batteries were transferred from other home service divisions. The rest of the division was composed of new units.

After assembling in Lancashire, 73rd Division moved in early January 1917 to join Southern Army of Home Forces, stationed in Essex and Hertfordshire, with the following composition:

Divisional Headquarters in Chelmsford.

=== 218th Brigade ===
218 Brigade was drawn from 9th Provisional Bde:

- GOC: Brigadier-General H. Martin (1 November 1916 – 17 March 1917)
  Brigadier-General W.M. Withycombe (17 March–10 July 1917)
  Brigadier-General A. Martyn (10 July 1917 – 31 January 1918)
- 41st Provisional Bn: became 12th Bn King's Own; disbanded 23 March 1918.
- 42nd Provisional Bn: became 14th Bn Loyals; the battalion was gradually drafted and was disbanded on 15 December 1917
- 44th Provisional Bn: became 26th Bn King's (Liverpool); disbanded 29 March 1918.
- 267th (Infantry) Bn, Training Reserve: joined by 23 July 1917, became 52nd (Graduated) Bn Leicestershire Regiment; transferred to 69th (2nd East Anglian) Division 17 January 1918.

The units of 218 Bde were stationed at Witham, Terling and Kelvedon.

=== 219th Brigade ===
219 Brigade was newly formed:

- GOC: Brigadier-General R. Dawson (1 November 1916 – 7 September 1917)
  Brigadier-General F.L. Bandon (7 September 1917 – 22 February 1918)
- 8th (Home Service) Battalion, Dorset Regiment; originally 2nd Garrison Bn Dorsets; the battalion was drafted to other battalions in 219 Bde and disbanded on 14 December 1917.
- 13th (Home Service) Bn Loyals: newly formed at Blackpool; disbanded 29 March 1918.
- 45th Provisional Bn from 9th Provisional Bde: became 28th Bn Manchesters; disbanded 29 March 1918.
- 270th Bn TR: joined by 9 September 1917, became 52nd (Graduated) Bn King's Own Yorkshire Light Infantry; transferred to 69th Division January 1918.

The units of 219 Bde were stationed at Danbury and Maldon, later moving to Southend.

=== 220th Brigade ===
220 Brigade was formed from 189th (2/1st Yorkshire and Durham) Bde:

- GOC: Brigadier-General F.F.W. Daniell (1 November 1916 – 27 February 1918)
- 2/4th Bn Green Howards; the battalion was gradually drafted and reduced to a cadre by the end of July 1917; absorbed into 2/5th Bn on 21 December 1917.
- 2/5th Bn Green Howards; disbanded 29 March 1918.
- 17th (Home Service) Bn Green Howards: newly formed at Blackpool; disbanded 15 December 1917.
- 273rd Bn TR: joined 23 July 1917; became 52nd (Graduated) Bn Durham Light Infantry 1 November 1917; transferred to 69th Division on 15 January 1918.
- 274th Bn TR: joined 9 July 1917; became 52nd (Graduated) Bn Royal Warwickshire Regiment 1 November 1917; transferred to 68th (2nd Welsh) Division by 11 March 1918.

The units of 220 Bde were stationed at Chelmsford, Widford and Arbour Lane.

=== Divisional mounted troops ===
- 9th Provisional Cyclist Company: became 73rd Divisional Cyclist Company Army Cyclist Corps (Home Service); disbanded by 1 April 1918.
- 1/8th (Cyclist) Bn Essex Regiment (attached January–October 1917).
- 2/7th (Cyclist) Bn Devonshire Regiment (attached October 1917–January 1918).

The mounted troops were stationed at Wickford and Southminster.

=== Royal Artillery ===
- Brigadier-General Royal Artillery: J.J. MacMahon (8 November 1916 – 12 March 1917)
  W.A. Robinson (12 March–19 November 1917)
  L.A.C. Gordon (19 November 1917 – 4 February 1918)
- HQ: Chelmsford
- CCCLIV Field Brigade RFA at Danbury:
  - A Battery (later 1211 Field Battery); formerly 9th Provisional Battery – 6 × 18-pounder QF guns
  - B Battery – 6 × 18-pdr
  - C (Howitzer) Battery – 4 × QF 4.5-inch howitzer
- CCCLV Field Brigade RFA at Great Leighs:
  - A Battery – 6 × 18-pdr
  - B Battery – 6 × 18-pdr
  - C (Howitzer) Battery – 4 × 4.5 Howitzer
- 73rd Divisional Ammunition Column; formerly 9th Provisional Brigade Ammunition Column.

=== Royal Engineers ===
- Commanding Royal Engineers: Lieutenant-Colonel H.W. Sanders
- 1/6th Kent Fortress Company RE: became 546th (1/6th Kent) Field Company
- 1/7th Kent Fortress Company RE: became 547th (1/7th Kent) Field Company
- 9th Provisional Field Company RE: became 648th (East Lancashire) Field Company
- 9th Provisional Signal Section: became 73rd Divisional Signal Company

The field companies were stationed at Witham and Chelmsford, and the signal company at Hitchin.

=== Medical services ===
- 9th Provisional Field Ambulance RAMC:
  - A Section: became 307th (Home Counties) Field Ambulance
  - B Section: became 308th (Home Counties) Field Ambulance
  - C Section: became 309th (Home Counties) Field Ambulance
- 109th Sanitary Section
- 58th Mobile Veterinary Section Army Veterinary Corps

=== Transport ===
- 73rd Divisional Train:
  - 9th Provisional Brigade Company ASC: became 829th Horse Transport Company ASC
  - 830th, 831st and 832nd HT Companies ASC: newly formed

== Training ==
The Military Service Act 1916 swept away the Home/Foreign service distinction, and all TF soldiers became liable for overseas service, if medically fit. Henceforth part of the role of the Home Service divisions was physical conditioning to render men fit for drafting overseas, alongside units of the Training Reserve. 'Graduated Battalions' of the Training Reserve were organised in four companies according to age, from 18 to 19 years. Recruits progressed from one to another company after three months, so that every three months there was a company of trained 19-year-old men available for drafting overseas. In July 1917 it was decided that the Graduated Battalions could serve in a Home Defence role while completing their training. Between July and September 1917, four Graduated Battalions joined 73rd Division, and in October these were affiliated to line regiments and adopted territorial designations.

== Disbandment ==
Towards the end of 1917 the War Office decided to break up the three home service divisions, and on 22 December 1917 the Commander-in-Chief, Home Forces, was ordered to break up the division as soon as possible. Three battalions left in January, the artillery was broken up in February, and the division ceased to exist on 8 April 1918. Only the divisional engineers remained, and on 22 June 1918 the HQ and field companies went to France for active service on the Western Front.

The 73rd Division title has never been reactivated.

== General Officer Commanding ==
- Major-General Hon. C.E. Bingham (2 November 1916 – 4 April 1917)
- Major-General J.C. Young (4 April–6 September 1917)
- Major-General H.G. Ruggles-Brise (6 September 1917 – 4 March 1918)

=== General Staff Officer ===
Lieutenant-Colonel E.B.C. Boddam (1 November 1916 – 12 January 1917) Lieutenant-Colonel C.M. Davies (16 January–31 December 1917)

=== Assistant-Adjutant and Quartermaster-General ===
Colonel C.L. Macnab (1 November 1916 – 17 April 1917) Lt-Col F.C. Dundas (24 April 1917 – 1 March 1918)

== See also ==
- List of British divisions in World War I

== Bibliography ==
- Maj A.F. Becke,History of the Great War: Order of Battle of Divisions, Part 2b: The 2nd-Line Territorial Force Divisions (57th–69th), with the Home-Service Divisions (73rd–74th) and 74th and 75th Divisions, London: HM Stationery Office, 1937/Uckfield: Naval & Military Press, 2007, ISBN 1-847347-39-8.
- J.B.M. Frederick, Lineage Book of British Land Forces 1660–1978, Vol I, Wakefield: Microform Academic, 1984, ISBN 1-85117-007-3.
- Brig E.A. James, British Regiments 1914–18, London: Samson Books, 1978, ISBN 0-906304-03-2/Uckfield: Naval & Military Press, 2001, ISBN 978-1-84342-197-9.
- War Office, Army Council Instructions Issued During January 1916, London: HM Stationery Office, 1916.
