= 206th Independent Infantry Brigade =

- Brigade badge used between December 1941 and October 1943.
- Active: 12 October 1940 – 6 October 1943
- Country: United Kingdom
- Branch: British Army
- Type: Infantry Brigade
- Role: Home Defence

206th Independent Infantry Brigade was a Home Defence formation of the British Army during the Second World War.

== Origin ==
The brigade was formed under the title of 206th Independent Infantry Brigade (Home) for service in the United Kingdom on 12 October 1940 by amalgamation of Headquarters Lothian Sub-Area and No 6 Infantry Training Group in Scottish Command. It originally comprised three newly raised infantry battalions and one Territorial Army machine gun battalion that had seen service in the Battle of France. It had no connection with 206th (2nd Essex) Brigade, a 2nd-Line Territorial Force formation raised during the First World War.

== Service ==
During its service the brigade came under the administrative control of several higher formations: Scottish Command (until 16 December 1940), 44th (Home Counties) Division (17 December 1940 – 23 February 1941), 56th (London) Division (23 February – 14 November 1941), 46th Division (14 November 1941 – 2 July 1942, 20 August – 30 November 1942), North Kent and Surrey Area (3 July – 19 August 1942), 43rd (Wessex) Division (1 December 1942 – 19 May 1943), Hampshire and Dorset District (20 May – 5 October 1943). The brigade remained in the UK throughout its service.

The brigade was re-designated the 206th Independent Infantry Brigade in December 1941. Brigade headquarters was disbanded on 6 October 1943.

== Order of battle ==
The composition of the 206th Brigade was as follows:

- 14th Battalion, Durham Light Infantry (12 October 1940 – 19 September 1942)
- 16th Battalion, Durham Light Infantry (12 October 1940 – 17 December 1940)
- 17th Battalion, Durham Light Infantry (12 October 1940 – 10 September 1942)
- 7th Battalion, Royal Northumberland Fusiliers (MG battalion) (12 October 1940 – 17 December 1940)
- 10th Battalion, South Staffordshire Regiment (4 December 1940 – 28 February 1942)
- 10th Battalion, Green Howards (1 February 1941 – 19 September 1942)
- 2/4th Battalion, South Lancashire Regiment (10 September 1942 – 25 May 1943)
- 9th Battalion, King's Regiment (Liverpool) (19 September 1942 – 12 April 1943)
- 9th Battalion, Buffs (Royal East Kent Regiment) (26 September 1942 – 1 October 1943)
- 2/4th Battalion, Essex Regiment (12 April – 1 October 1943)
- 11th Battalion, Devonshire Regiment (29 May – 8 September 1943)
- 12th Battalion, Cameronians (Scottish Rifles) (20 August – 23 September 1943)

== Commanders ==
The commanders of 206th Bde were:

- Brigadier F.G. Drew (until 24 May 1941)
- Brigadier R.A. Boxshall (24 May 1941 – 20 July 1942)
- Brigadier L. Tremellen (20 July 1942 – 10 May 1943)
- Brigadier G.F. Ellenberger (from 10 May 1943)
