= William Frederick Cavaye =

British Army general (1845–1926)

Major-General William Frederick Cavaye CMG
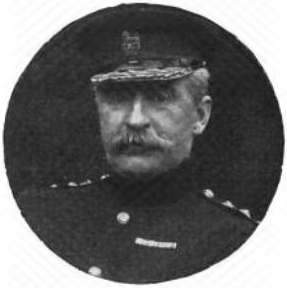
- In The Sketch, 22 August 1900
- Born: 15 February 1845; Edinburgh, Scotland
- Died: 30 January 1926 (aged 80); London, England
- Military career
- Allegiance: United Kingdom
- Branch: British Army
- Service years: 1865–1902; 1914–1919
- Rank: Major-General
- Commands: 69th (2nd East Anglian) Division
- Conflicts: Anglo-Zulu War; First World War
- Awards: Companion of the Order of St Michael and St George; Mentioned in Despatches

Major-General William Frederick Cavaye, CMG (15 February 1845 – 30 January 1926) was a British Army officer and Municipal Reform Party politician.

== Early life ==
Cavaye was the eldest son of General William Cavaye (died 1896) and his wife Isabella (née Hutchinson), and was born in Edinburgh, Scotland. His father retired to 12 Royal Circus in the Stockbridge district around 1860. Following schooling at Edinburgh Academy and in Charlton, he entered the Royal Military College, Sandhurst.

== Military career ==
In 1865 Cavaye was commissioned as an ensign into the 107th Regiment of Foot. He rose through the officer ranks to become a lieutenant on 9 March 1867, a captain on 13 December 1874, and a major on 1 July 1881, having served with distinction in the Anglo-Zulu War of 1879. The 107th Foot became the 2nd Battalion of the Royal Sussex Regiment under the Childers reforms of 1881: Cavaye became the battalion's commanding officer with the rank of lieutenant-colonel on 15 August 1883.

Cavaye was further promoted, becoming Assistant Adjutant General and chief of staff of the Southern District with the rank of colonel. He served "on special service" in the Second Boer War of 1899–1902, and was mentioned in despatches. He was placed on half-pay on 24 March 1902, and retired from the army on 15 December 1902.

Following the outbreak of the First World War, Cavaye returned to active service. He was appointed commanding officer of the 2nd East Anglian Division in November 1914 with the rank of brigadier-general. The division did not serve abroad, but Cavaye subsequently served on "special service" with the British Expeditionary Force in France from 1917 to 1919, and was raised to the rank of major-general. From 1919 to 1920 he was a King's Messenger.

== Local government ==
In 1906 Cavaye began his involvement in local government, when he was elected to Kensington Borough Council, in the County of London. He was one of nine councillors for the Brompton ward of the royal borough, all members of the Conservative-backed Municipal Reform Party. He was mayor of the borough for two consecutive terms in 1907–1909. He remained a member of the borough council until his death, latterly as an alderman.

In 1910 Cavaye was elected to the London County Council as a Municipal Reform councillor for South Kensington. He held the seat for fifteen years before retiring from the LCC at the 1925 election due to ill-health.

== Family ==
In 1862 Cavaye married Ada Mary Barttelot, youngest daughter of Walter Barttelot, member of parliament for West Sussex.

Cavaye died at his London home, 6 Neville Terrace, SW7, on 30 January 1926. He was buried, following a military funeral, at Stopham, Sussex. In 1937 two Kensington streets, Chelsea Grove and Clifton Place, were combined into a single thoroughfare named "Cavaye Place" in honour of the general.

Military offices
New command	GOC 69th (2nd East Anglian) Division; 1914–1915	Succeeded by Francis Kelly
