= 7th Battalion, Essex Regiment =

- Active: 1 February 1860 – 1 May 1961
- Country: United Kingdom
- Branch: Territorial Army
- Role: Infantry; Air Defence
- Part of: Essex Brigade
- Garrison/HQ: Silvertown; Walthamstow
- Engagements: WWI: Gallipoli; Senussi Campaign; Palestine; WWII: Battle of Britain; Blitz; North Africa; Italy

Commanders
- Notable commanders: Hugh Adams Silver

The 7th Battalion, Essex Regiment was a volunteer unit of Britain's Territorial Army. First formed in the eastern suburbs of London in 1860, it served as infantry at Gallipoli and in Palestine during World War I. It later became an anti-aircraft (AA) unit of the Royal Artillery (RA), serving in North Africa and Italy during World War II.

== Origin ==
An invasion scare in 1859 led to the creation of the Volunteer Force and huge enthusiasm for joining local Rifle Volunteer Corps (RVCs). The 9th (Silvertown) Essex Rifle Volunteer Corps was one such unit, formed on 1 February 1860 at Silvertown, a new industrial suburb of London on the Essex bank of the River Thames. The unit was raised and equipped by Hugh Adams Silver (1825–1912), brother of the founder of Silvertown and head of the India Rubber, Gutta Percha and Telegraph Cable Company. The unit was included in the 2nd Administrative Battalion of Essex RVCs until 1866 when it was large enough to become independent. It was renumbered as the 4th Essex RVC in 1880, and designated the 4th Volunteer Battalion of the Essex Regiment in 1883 following the Childers Reforms. In 1900, the battalion was increased to a strength of 11 companies, with its HQ moved to Leyton. The uniform was Rifle green with facings of the same colour, changing to the scarlet with white facings of the Essex Regiment in 1902.

Volunteer Reviews were popular events, and could be boisterous affairs. When trains carrying Volunteers for the Windsor Review in June 1868 were delayed at Datchet station there was considerable confusion and indiscipline. This resulted in Parliamentary questions and the 9th (Silvertown) Essex and 2nd (Watford) Herts RVCs were ordered to be disbanded, though this was later rescinded.

The battalion was assigned to Local Brigade No 6 in the short-lived mobilisation scheme of 1880. Then under the Stanhope Memorandum of 1888 the four Volunteer Battalions of the Essex Regiment were constituted as the Essex Brigade, with its headquarters at Warley Barracks, later at Epping Place, Epping. In wartime, it was intended that the brigade would mobilise at an entrenched camp at Warley. In peacetime the brigade provided a structure for collective training. Finding suitable ranges for musketry training was a problem: the 4th Volunteer Battalion usually had to travel to a range at Wraysbury near Staines on the far side of London.

A detachment of 14 infantry and 6 mounted infantry from the 4th VB volunteered for service with the City Imperial Volunteers in the 2nd Boer War. In addition, the four Essex Volunteer Battalions together provided a 112-strong Special Service Company to serve alongside the Regulars of the 1st Battalion Essex Regiment in the first part of the war, replaced by a second company of 101 men in 1901–02. These volunteers (136 from the 4th Bn) gained the Battle Honour South Africa 1900–02 for the battalion.

== Territorial Force ==
On the formation of the Territorial Force (TF) in 1908 as part of the Haldane Reforms, the 4th Volunteer Battalion became the 7th Battalion, Essex Regiment, with headquarters at Cooks Terrace in Silvertown and three companies at Hackney, two each at Leyton and Walthamstow, and one at Silvertown. In 1912, it handed part of its recruiting area over to the newly formed 10th Battalion, London Regiment (Hackney Rifles) under its former commanding officer, Col G.T.B. Cobbett, and consolidated all its companies at a new HQ at Walthamstow Lodge, Walthamstow, with a detachment at Chingford.

The Essex Brigade now formed part of the TF's East Anglian Division, which trained together for the first time in 1911 at a camp near Thetford.

== World War I ==
=== Mobilisation ===
The East Anglian Division was a week into its fortnight's annual training at Clacton when the order to mobilise arrived on 4 August 1914. The units immediately proceeded to their designated war stations defending the East Anglian coast, with 7th Essex at Felixstowe. They were relieved on 9 August to return to Walthamstow to mobilise, and by 10 August the division was concentrated around Brentwood, Essex, with 7th Bn HQ at the Golden Fleece Inn. The 7th later moved to the cavalry barracks in Norwich, and then Costessey Hall.

In August 1914, the Essex Brigade formed a Service Battalion of volunteers from all four battalions. This was put at 24 hours' notice for service in France, but was stood down in November and the men returned to their battalions. Meanwhile, all TF units were forming '2nd Line' units composed of recruits and those men who had not volunteered for Overseas Service. The Essex recruits were only asked to volunteer for overseas service after they were attested, and many opted for Home Service only. Thus, the 2/7th Bn (as this reserve unit became known) was fully up to strength whereas the parent battalion (designated 1/7th) remained below establishment.

The East Anglian Division was designated the 54th (East Anglian) Division in May 1915, and its brigades were numbered, the Essex Brigade becoming 161st (Essex) Brigade. The 2nd Line units were assigned to duplicate formations, the 2/7th Essex joining 206th (2nd Essex) Brigade in 69th (2nd East Anglian) Division. During the war, 161 Brigade adopted shoulder flashes coloured red and black, divided vertically, with the red worn to the front on each arm. Each battalion adopted a distinctive shape for this patch, the 1/7th Bn wearing a square.

=== 1/7th Battalion ===
The 54th Division was part of Central Force, the mobile force organised for Home Defence, and was employed on coast defence with 1/7th Bn at Colchester until May 1915, when the division concentrated around St Albans to prepare for overseas service. On 8 July, it heard that it was to be employed at Gallipoli. 161st Brigade sailed from Devonport, Devon, with two companies of 1/7th Bn embarked in HMT Southland departing on 24 July and the remainder in the SS Braemar Castle on 26 July. The two vessels rendezvoused at Imbros on 10 August and the battalion landed on 'A' Beach at Suvla Bay after midnight on 11/12 August.

==== Gallipoli ====
The Gallipoli Campaign had been in progress for several months and had reached stalemate. A fresh Landing at Suvla Bay on 6 August 1915 was intended to turn the flank of the Turkish positions on the Gallipoli Peninsula and drive inland. The operation was bungled, and 54th Division, as the last remaining reserve, was landed to drive through, but was used merely to shore up the position. The Essex battalions arrived still understrength, and armed with obsolete long Lee–Enfield rifles – many soldiers exchanged these for modern SMLE weapons picked up from casualties.

1/7th Essex went straight into the reserve line when 161 Bde relieved 163rd (Norfolk & Suffolk) Brigade for an attack. 161 Brigade's participation was cancelled; however, on the afternoon of 14 August, the brigade advanced over open ground to relieve the Norfolks and Suffolks after their disastrous attack. The Essex Brigade's historian records that 'Though they were met with a fusillade as they advanced steadily over the plain there was no hesitation'. They reached the line and spent all night consolidating the position, the 1/7th having suffered 25 casualties during the advance.

On 17/18 August, the brigade relieved the 10th (Irish) Division at Kiretch Tepe, the 1/7th Bn taking over 'Jephson's Post'. Intermittent shellfire on these positions caused considerable casualties before the battalion was relieved on 22 August. The brigade then moved to the Lala Baba sector, and from 1 to 10 September interchanged with parties of the 4th Australian Brigade. A Company of 1/7th was attached to Australian troops at 'Table Top', B Company went to 'Rhododendron Spur', and the remainder of the battalion worked on a new communication trench.

Next, the battalion moved to the Hill 60 sector, described by one of the officers as 'notoriously one of the most unpleasant spots on the peninsula'. It was attached to 163 Bde to prepare for an attack to capture the rest of the hill, where opposing trench lines were only 17 yards apart and sappers on both sides were digging mines. The operation was repeatedly postponed: even though the 1/7th Essex was the strongest battalion in 163 Bde, its battle casualties were running at about 50 a month and a much higher proportion were sick in hospital. 1/7th Battalion did receive a draft of 2 officers and 70 other ranks in early November, but it was not enough. The already debilitated brigade was too weak to mount even a smaller attack. The British mines were finally fired on 14 November and a 100-strong party of the 1/7th Bn was tasked with seizing the crater, but the trenches were obstructed by debris and the attack was called off. On 24 November, a Turkish mine exploded under 'Essex Barricade', killing 8 and wounding 10 of the battalion.

On the night of 26/27 November, the Essex were relieved by Gurkhas and the New Zealand Mounted Rifles Brigade, the relief being delayed by a severe rainstorm that flooded the trenches. After a few days in the rest area, 54 Division marched down to the beach and embarked for Mudros on 4 December. It did not return to the peninsula, which was later evacuated, and instead the division sailed to Alexandria.

==== Egypt ====
As soon as it arrived in Egypt, the battalion became involved in the Senussi Campaign when 161 Bde marched out on 28 December to replace the New Zealand Rifle Brigade guarding the coast railway from Alexandria to Da'aba. The Essex battalions were relieved from this duty on 4 March 1916 by the 2nd County of London Yeomanry and moved into the No 1 (Southern) Section of the Suez Canal Defences. In August, the battalion was moved northwards to counter a Turkish thrust at the canal, and was present at the Battle of Romani, though not engaged.

==== Sinai and Palestine ====
During 1916, the units of 54th Division were steadily brought up to strength by the arrival of drafts, and in mid-January 1917 the division assembled for the opening of the Palestine Campaign. It took the whole of February for 161 Bde to cross the Sinai Desert in stages. It was then involved in all three Battles of Gaza, in March, April and November 1917.

At the First Battle of Gaza (26 March 1917), the main attack was made by 53rd (Welsh) Division with 161 Bde in support. Towards the end of the day the Essex Brigade was ordered to take Green Hill: despite heavy fighting the attack was a complete success and the brigade held the whole position by nightfall. However, confusion set in, and 53rd Division withdrew during the night. The men of 161 Bde were enraged by the order to withdraw. The following day patrols showed that the Turks had not reoccupied the position; 1/7th Bn was sent up to support the patrols, but a violent Turkish counter-attack finished the battle. The battalion's casualties at Green Hill were 228, of whom 68 were missing after the fighting withdrawal.

For the Second Battle of Gaza (17–19 April 1917) 1/7th Bn was detached from 161 Bde and was assigned to the Imperial Camel Corps (ICC), which was protecting the left flank of 54th Division. On 16 and 17 April, the 1/7th Essex was escorting artillery. On 19 April the battalion remained with the Hong Kong and Singapore Battery in support of the ICC's morning attack, and then at 10.30 pushed forward to help the right flank of 3rd (Australian) Camel Bn when the Australian Light Horse retired. When the 1/7th Essex withdrew, it had suffered casualties of only 2 killed and 7 wounded, while the rest of 54th Division was badly cut up in the failed main assault.

During the summer months, 161 Bde held the line without suffering serious casualties, and by the end of October the 1/7th Bn was fully up to strength for the forthcoming Third Battle of Gaza (1–3 November 1917). On the morning of 2 November, the 54th Division put in a holding attack at the El Arish Redoubt. The fighting was confused, but the division took all its objectives. However, the 1/7th Bn found that the fourth objective, 'John Trench', was a mere scrape in the ground and could not be held. The brigade commander considered that this battalion had the hardest time of all that day. At 04.00, on 3 November, 1/7th made a renewed attempt to take their objective, but were again held up by Turkish machine-gun fire. The battalion's casualties over the three days were heavy, at 281 all ranks. During the rapid pursuit after the fall of Gaza, 1/7th was left marching in the rear.

As well as battle casualties, the whole brigade suffered considerably from influenza during November–December 1917 and throughout 1918. The weakened brigade was mainly engaged in line-holding until September 1918. 54th Division was held in readiness to move to reinforce the Western Front, but in the end was not sent.

54th Division returned to the offensive for the Battle of Megiddo (19–25 September 1918), which finally broke the Turkish resistance. To support the breakthrough, 161 Bde was to secure the Es Zakur line and then form a defensive flank. The brigade formed up before dawn on 19 September, with 1/7th Bn in the second line. Covered by an overhead barrage from the machine gun companies, the first line took the two objectives successfully, with platoons of 1/7th close up in support. The main assault completely broke through the Turkish lines and opened the way for the cavalry to pursue the defeated enemy. 161 Brigade was left behind for a week on battlefield clearance before joining the pursuit. By the time the Armistice with Turkey was signed on 30 October 1918, 54th Division had reached Beirut.

==== Demobilisation ====
Soon after the Armistice, 54th Division moved back to Egypt by sea. By the end of the year, with men returning from hospital, the 1/7th Bn was well over its establishment strength. Preparations for demobilisation began, but civil unrest in Egypt meant that 161 Bde was engaged in peacekeeping duties from March to May 1919. After June, the duties became very light and demobilisation proceeded. 1/7th Battalion was reduced to a cadre on 9 July and absorbed by 1/5th Bn. It was formally disembodied on 29 August and the whole Essex Brigade was fully demobilised by Christmas 1919.

=== 2/7th Battalion ===
The 2/7th Essex Bn began forming at Walthamstow on 11 August 1914, initially comprising those members of the parent unit who had not volunteered for overseas service, together with recruits under training. At first the battalion only had .256-in Japanese Ariska rifles with which to train. By December, it was at Peterborough, and in early summer 1915 at Thetford. When the Home Service men were removed to form Provisional Battalions, the 2/7th was particularly badly hit and could barely raise a company of men available for overseas service. In 1916, it was brought up to strength with Derby Scheme men and expected to be sent overseas, but instead it continued to provide drafts to other battalions. It served in 206th (2/1st Essex) Brigade in 69th (2nd East Anglian) Division on Home Defence at Harrogate (July 1916), then from April 1917 at Welbeck. This continued until 10 October 1917 when the battalion was transferred to 201st (2/1st Middlesex) Brigade in 67th (2nd Home Counties) Division, with the battalion quartered in The Granville Hotel, Ramsgate. It was broken up on 25 March 1918, the remaining men going to the 4th Reserve Bn.

=== 3/7th Battalion ===
The 3/7th Bn was formed at Walthamstow on 7 May 1915 to act as a reserve for the 1st and 2nd Bns. It moved to Windsor Great Park with the other Essex Regiment 3rd Bns in August that year, and then to Halton Park in October. In April 1916, its title was altered to 7th Reserve Bn Essex Regiment, and on 1 September it was absorbed by the 4th Reserve Bn.

=== 17th Battalion ===
In 1915, the 'Home Service-only' and unfit men of the TF were formed into Provisional units for home defence. The Essex Regiment formed three such battalions, with the men of 7th Bn and some of 5th Bn forming 67th Provisional Battalion in 3rd Provisional Brigade. In 1915 3rd Provisional Bde was attached to 69th (2nd East Anglian) Division in the area around Thetford, Norfolk, Newmarket and Bury St Edmunds in Suffolk. In March 1916, the brigade came under Northern Army in Norfolk, where 67th Provisional Bn was stationed at Cley next the Sea. When the Military Service Act 1916 swept away the Home/Overseas Service distinction, all TF soldiers became liable for drafting overseas if medically fit, and the provisional battalions became numbered battalions of their parent regiments on 1 January 1917. 67th Provisional Battalion became 17th Battalion, Essex Regiment at Sheringham, moving to Weybourne by July, while 3rd Provisional Brigade was redesignated 223rd Brigade. The battalion was disbanded at Holt, Norfolk, on 17 March 1919.

== Interwar ==
The 7th Bn Essex Regiment was reformed in the retitled Territorial Army (TA) on 7 February 1920, once again in 161st (Essex) Brigade of 54th (East Anglian) Division. In the 1930s, the increasing need for anti-aircraft (AA) defence, particularly for South East England, was addressed by converting a number of TA infantry battalions to the AA role, the 7th Essex being transferred to the Royal Artillery (RA) on 15 December 1935 as 59th (Essex Regiment) Anti-Aircraft Brigade, RA. The personnel continued to wear the Essex Regiment badge and buttons. The unit had the following organisation:

- HQ and 164 Battery at Drill Hall, Church Hill, Walthamstow
- 167 Battery at Drill Hall, Church Road, Leyton
- 193 Battery at Leigh-on-Sea

The unit formed part of 29th (East Anglian) AA Group in 1st AA Division, later transferred to 37th Anti-Aircraft Brigade in 6th AA Division as the number of AA units grew after the Munich Crisis and AA Command was formed. As part of this expansion, 193 Battery was transferred on 1 November 1938 to form a new 82nd (Essex) AA Regiment based at Barking, and the 59th raised a new 265 Battery at Whipps Cross on 1 October. 37 AA Brigade was responsible for defending the 'Thames North' AA layout on the Essex side of the Thames Estuary. On 1 January 1939, the 59th in common with all RA 'brigades' was redesignated a 'regiment'.

== World War II ==
=== Phoney War ===
AA Command mobilised in August 1939 and its units were at their war stations before war broke out on 3 September. Opportunities for action were rare during the Phoney War that followed, but on the night of 22/23 November 1939 the HAA guns of 37 AA Bde manning the 'Thames North' layout combined with those of 28 AA Bde on the other bank of the river ('Thames South') to engage at least two enemy mine-laying aircraft that had strayed into the mouth of the Estuary. One wrecked aircraft was found on the marshes.

=== Battle of Britain and Blitz ===
In the summer of 1940, AA units equipped with the older 3-inch or the newer 3.7-inch AA guns were designated Heavy AA Regiments, the 59th becoming 59th (Essex Regiment) Heavy Anti-Aircraft Regiment, RA. 59 HAA Regiment continued to serve in 37 AA Bde, the 'Thames North' AA layout being heavily engaged during the Battle of Britain and The Blitz.

The regiment sent a cadre to 207th HAA Training Regiment at Devizes to form a new 397 HAA Bty on 12 December 1940; this later joined 122nd HAA Rgt. The regiment also sent a cadre to 206th HAA Training Regiment at Arborfield to form a new 429 Bty on 8 May 1941; this rejoined 59th HAA Rgt on 6 August 1941

=== Mid-war years ===
By September, the regiment went to join 42 AA Bde covering Glasgow and the Firth of Clyde in 12th AA Division.

By December 1941, the regiment had returned to the Thames Estuary to join 28 AA Bde in the Thames South layout. 429 Bty joined 140th HAA Rgt on 1 December but 59th HAA Rgt had gained an additional Battery (418), previously an unregimented unit. However, in that month it joined 46 AA Bde in 8th AA Division, covering the Bristol area, while 418 HAA Bty joined 140th HAA Rgt.

By August 1942, 59th HAA Rgt, with 164, 167, 265 Btys was under direct War Office control as part of the Field Force, and by November it had gained the additional units to make it fully mobile, giving it the following composition:

- 164 HAA Bty
- 167 HAA Bty
- 265 HAA Bty
- 59 HAA Rgt Signal Section, Royal Corps of Signals
- 59 HAA Workshop, Royal Electrical and Mechanical Engineers
- 59 HAA Rgt Platoon, Royal Army Service Corps

=== North Africa ===
The regiment left the UK in November 1942 and sailed to Tunisia, where it came under Allied Force Headquarters in December. By mid-January 1943, it had deployed under 66 AA Bde around Bône port and airfield. Bone was an important supply base, and in the first three months of 1943 it was subjected to 99 separate air raids. 59 HAA defended Bone until the end of the campaign in May 1943.

=== Italy ===
59th HAA Regiment was not involved in the invasion of Sicily (Operation Husky, but joined Eighth Army for the campaign in mainland Italy. It reached Naples in late October 1943 to take over the air defence of the city under 22 AA Bde. The defended area over the port, the anchorages and adjacent airfields was declared an Inner Artillery Zone (IAZ), giving AA guns priority over fighters at night. The problem of radar coverage of the Bay of Naples was partly solved when the new centimetric Mk. III GL radar became available. Luftwaffe raids over the city were frequent and heavy during November.

The deployment at Naples turned into a long-term commitment. Heavy air raids resumed in March 1944, after which they progressively declined, and AA defence strength there could finally be reduced. 59th HAA Regiment transferred across to south-east Italy to join 25 AA Bde around Bari and Brindisi in September 1944. The brigade's tasks were complete by January 1945 and it was disbanded, 59th HAA transferring again to 66 AA Bde at Leghorn, defending US Fifth Army's main supply base, though it attracted little enemy air activity.

While serving in Italy, the regiment absorbed drafts of African Basuto soldiers, who were also given the right to wear the Essex badge.

The long static spell ended in April 1945, when the Allies launched their Spring offensive and 66 AA Bde was ordered to move 100 miles to Genoa. The AA gunners captured the city themselves, with little difficulty, and then took over its defence. However, the war in Italy ended later that month, and AA defence ended. In May 1945, 66 AA Bde was turned into a transport pool using the AA regiments' vehicles. The regiment, with 167 and 265 HAA Btys, was placed in suspended animation on 1 November 1945, followed by 164 HAA Bty on 16 December.

== Postwar ==
On 1 January 1947, the regiment was reformed at Walthamstow in the reconstituted TA as 459th (The Essex Regiment) (Mixed) Heavy Anti-Aircraft Regiment, Royal Artillery ('Mixed' denoting that members of the Women's Royal Army Corps were integrated into the regiment). It formed part of 52 (London) AA Bde.

AA Command was disbanded in 1955 and there were widespread mergers within the TA's AA regiments. 459 HAA Regiment absorbed 482 (M) HAA Regiment (the former 82 (Essex) HAA Regiment to which 59th had provided a battery on formation) and 599 and 600 HAA Regiments, which had been created from the 1/6th and 2/6th Bttns Essex Regiment. It now formed part of 33 AA Bde (derived from the former 37 AA Bde).

A further merger in 1961, with 512 (Finsbury Rifles) and 517 (Essex) Light Anti-Aircraft regiments and 48 Surveillance Radar Troop into 300 LAA Regiment, saw the Essex lineage discontinued, the combined regiment later being designated 300 (Tower Hamlets) Light Air Defence Regiment.

== Battle Honours ==
The battalion was awarded the Battle Honour South Africa 1900–1902 in recognition of the volunteers who served in the 2nd Boer War. During World War I it contributed to the honours of its parent regiment. One of the 10 WWI honours selected to be displayed on the King's Colour was Gaza, which was won solely by the TF battalions of 161 Bde. The Royal Artillery does not receive battle honours, so none were awarded for 59 HAA Regiment's service in World War II.

== Commanding officers ==
Commanding officers of the battalion include:

9th (Silvertown) Essex RVC

- Col H.A. Silver, VD, from 1860 to ca 1890.

4th Volunteer Bn, Essex Regiment

- Lt-Col G.C. Brown, appointed 1892
- Lt-Col Col J.W. Beningfield, appointed 1893
- Lt-Col J.R. Parkinton (later Sir John Roper Parkington, Hon Col), appointed 1900
- Lt-Col G.T.B. Cobbett, appointed 1906 (to 10th London 1912)

7th Bn, Essex Regiment

- Lt-Col F.W. Hearn, appointed 1912

2/7th Bn, Essex Regiment

- Lt-Col Savage Armstrong, DSO, 1916
- Lt-Col C.W.W. Burrell

3/7th Bn, Essex Regiment

- Lt-Col Anderson Neville, May 1915–Sep 1916

7th Bn, Essex Regiment

- Lt-Col H.F. Kemball, TD, appointed February 1920 (later Hon Col)
- Bt-Col G. Shenstone, TD, appointed February 1924
- Lt-Col F.R. Waller, TD, appointed February 1930
- Bt-Col C.D. Martin, OBE, TD, appointed 17 February 1934

== Honorary Colonels ==
The following officers served as Honorary Colonel of the battalion:

- Sir J.R. Parkington, appointed 11 August 1911
- Col H.F. Kemball, TD, appointed 3 May 1924

== Memorial ==
A memorial to the 7th Essex/59th HAA (and 3rd East Anglian Field Ambulance) was erected at Church Hill, Walthamstow. In the 1950s it was moved to Whipps Cross. The text reads:

TO THE/ GLORIOUS MEMORY OF/ OUR COMRADES OF THE/ 7TH BATTALION/ THE ESSEX REGIMENT(T)/ AND THE/ 3RD EAST ANGLIAN/ FIELD AMBULANCE RAMC (T)/ WHO GAVE THEIR LIVES IN/ THE GREAT WAR/ 1914 - 1918/ AND OF THE/ 59TH (THE ESSEX REGIMENT)/ HAA ARTILLERY/ ROYAL ARTILLERY REGIMENT (TA)/ WHO GAVE THEIR LIVES IN/ THE SECOND WORLD WAR/ 1939 - 1945/ WE ARE THE DEAD./ TO YOU WITH FAILING HANDS/ WE THROW THE TORCH;/ BE YOURS TO HOLD IT HIGH.

== See also ==
Photographs of war memorial at Walthamstow War Memorial Project
