= 6th Battalion, Essex Regiment =

- Active: 30 January 1860 – 1 May 1961
- Country: United Kingdom
- Branch: Territorial Army
- Role: Infantry; Air defence
- Part of: Essex Brigade
- Garrison/HQ: West Ham
- Engagements: First World War: Gallipoli; Senussi Campaign; Palestine; Second World War: Battle of Britain; Blitz

Commanders
- Notable commanders: Charles Capper

The 6th Battalion, Essex Regiment was a volunteer unit of Britain's Territorial Army. First formed in the docks of East London in 1860, it served as infantry at Gallipoli and in Palestine during the First World War. It later formed searchlight units of the Royal Artillery (RA), serving during the Blitz.

== Origin ==
An invasion scare in 1859 led to the creation of the Volunteer Force and huge enthusiasm for joining local Rifle Volunteer Corps (RVCs). The 5th (Plaistow and Victoria Docks) Essex Rifle Volunteer Corps was one such unit, formed on 30 January 1860 at Plaistow, mainly from employees of the Victoria Dock (later Royal Victoria Dock), which had opened in 1855 on Plaistow Marshes. The first commanding officer was the dock manager Charles Capper.

The four-company unit was included with the nearby 9th (Silvertown) Essex RVC in the 2nd Administrative Battalion of Essex RVCs (under Capper's command) until 1866 when the two units were large enough to become independent. The 5th was renumbered as the 3rd Essex RVC in 1880, and became a volunteer battalion of the Essex Regiment on 1 July 1881 under the Childers Reforms. It was designated the 3rd Volunteer Battalion in February 1883. In 1885, the Battalion headquarters moved to The Cedars, a large house on the Portway in West Ham that had previously been home to the Prison Reformer Elizabeth Fry. By 1900, the battalion had increased to a strength of 13 companies, with a cadet corps affiliated from 1907. The uniform was Rifle green with facings of the same colour, changing to the scarlet with white facings of the Essex Regiment in 1895.

Under the Stanhope Memorandum of 1888, the four Volunteer Battalions of the Essex Regiment were constituted as the Essex Brigade, with its headquarters at Warley Barracks, later at Epping Place, Epping. In time of war, it was intended that the brigade would mobilise at an entrenched camp at Warley. In peacetime, the brigade provided a structure for collective training.

A detachment from the Essex Brigade volunteered for service with the City Imperial Volunteers in the 2nd Boer War. In addition, the four Essex Volunteer Battalions together provided a 112-strong Special Service Company to serve alongside the Regulars of the 1st Battalion Essex Regiment in the first part of the war, replaced by a second company of 101 men in 1901–02. These volunteers gained the Battle Honour South Africa 1900–02 for the battalion.

== Territorial Force ==
On the formation of the Territorial Force (TF) in 1908 as part of the Haldane Reforms, the 3rd Volunteer Battalion became the 6th Battalion, Essex Regiment. The Battalion comprised a Headquarters and seven Rifle Companies, "A" to "G" based at the Cedars. The final Company, "H," was raised at Southend-on-Sea and had its HQ in the Artillery Drill Hall on York Road, plus outlying Detachments in Leigh-on-Sea and at Clacton-on-Sea, the latter being absorbed into 5th Battalion The Essex Regiment in 1911. At the same time, the remainder of the Company moved to the Drill Hall at 110 East Street, Prittlewell. Around this time, the Battalion was allotted the task of raising the Signal Section of the Essex Infantry Brigade, which was formed in Grays at the Artillery Drill Hall in Brooke Road. The Essex Brigade now formed part of the TF's East Anglian Division, which trained together for the first time in 1911 at a camp near Thetford.

== First World War ==
=== Mobilisation ===
The East Anglian Division was a week into its fortnight's annual training at Clacton when the order to mobilise arrived on 4 August 1914. The 6th Essex returned to West Ham to mobilise and quickly proceeded to its designated war station defending Shoeburyness on the East Anglian coast. The division then concentrated around Brentwood. The battalion went to Norwich in late August and by April 1915 was at Colchester

In August 1914, the Essex Brigade formed a Service Battalion of volunteers from all four battalions. This was put at 24 hours' notice for service in France, but was stood down in November and the men returned to their battalions. Meanwhile, all TF units were forming '2nd Line' units composed of recruits and those men who had not volunteered for Overseas Service. The Essex recruits were only asked to volunteer for overseas service after they were attested, and many opted for Home Service only. Thus the 2/6th Bn (as this reserve unit became known) was fully up to strength whereas the parent battalion (designated 1/6th) remained below establishment.

The East Anglian Division was designated the 54th (East Anglian) Division in May 1915, and its brigades were numbered, the Essex Brigade becoming 161st (Essex) Brigade. The 2nd Line units were assigned to duplicate formations, the 2/6th Essex joining 206th (2nd Essex) Brigade in 69th (2nd East Anglian) Division. During the war, 161 Brigade adopted shoulder flashes coloured red and black, divided vertically, with the red worn to the front on each arm. Each battalion adopted a distinctive shape for this patch, the 1/6th Bn wearing a horizontal rectangle.

=== 1/6th Battalion ===
In January 1915, the Battalion, in keeping with other Territorial Infantry Battalions, was reorganised onto a four Company system, bringing it into line with the Regular Army, by amalgamating pairs of Companies, therefore "A" and "E" merged to become "A" Coy, "B" and "F" became "B" Coy, "C" and "G" became "C" Coy and "D" and "H" as "D" Coy. The Brigade Signal Section was merged into the East Anglian Divisional Signal Company.

The 54th Division was part of Central Force, the mobile force organised for Home Defence, and was employed on coast defence until May 1915, when the division concentrated around St Albans to prepare for overseas service. On 8 July, it heard that it was to be employed at Gallipoli. 161st Brigade sailed from Devonport, with 1/6th Bn embarked in HMT Southland departing on 24 July. The battalion landed on 'A' Beach at Suvla Bay after midnight on 11/12 August.

==== Gallipoli ====
The Gallipoli Campaign had been in progress for several months and had reached stalemate. A fresh Landing at Suvla Bay on 6 August 1915 was intended to turn the flank of the Turkish positions on the Gallipoli Peninsula and drive inland. The operation was bungled, and 54th Division, as the last remaining reserve, was landed to drive through, but was used merely to shore up the position. The Essex battalions arrived still understrength, and armed with obsolete long Lee–Enfield rifles – many soldiers exchanged these for modern SMLE weapons picked up from casualties.

1/6th Essex went straight into the reserve line when 161 Bde relieved 163rd (Norfolk & Suffolk) Brigade for an attack. The battalion advanced on Kiretch Tepe, with C Company in the lead, but was forced to retire due to heavy shrapnel and sniper fire. The battalion had suffered its first battle casualties: 2 other ranks killed, 3 officers and 54 other ranks wounded. On the afternoon of 14 August, the brigade advanced again over open ground to relieve 163rd Brigade after their disastrous attack, the 1/6th Essex relieving the 1/8th Hampshire Regiment in the firing line. The Essex Brigade's historian records that 'Though they were met with a fusillade as they advanced steadily over the plain there was no hesitation'. They reached the line and spent all night consolidating the position.

The following day (15 August) the 1/6th moved to the support line behind 'Jephson's Post' and the following day moved up to take over the position, losing 7 other ranks killed, 2 officers and 19 other ranks wounded, and 2 missing, during this move. Intermittent shellfire on these positions caused further casualties before the battalion was relieved on 23 August. The brigade then moved to the Lala Baba sector, and on 31 August relieved 13th Australian Bn in the forward trenches in the Hill 60 sector, described by one of the officers as 'notoriously one of the most unpleasant spots on the peninsula'. The 1/6th Bn alternated with the Australians until they were relieved on 4 October. During this period of trench warfare, the battalion lost 5 killed and 12 wounded, but had 140 sick evacuated to hospital.

During October and November, while serving turns in frontline trenches with names like 'West Ham Gully' and 'Upton Park' (the home ground of West Ham United F.C.), the battalion lost another 5 killed, 26 wounded, 2 missing and 386 sick, offset by drafts of just 19 officers and 95 other ranks. By the end of November the Essex Brigade was reduced to a shadow. On the night of 26/27 November, the Essex were relieved by the New Zealand Mounted Rifles Brigade, the relief being delayed by a severe rainstorm that flooded the trenches. After a few days in the rest area, 54th Division marched down to the beach and embarked for Mudros. It did not return to the peninsula, which was later evacuated, and instead the division sailed to Alexandria, arriving on 17 December.

==== Egypt ====
As soon as it arrived in Egypt, the battalion became involved in the Senussi Campaign when 161 Bde marched out on 28 December to replace the New Zealand Rifle Brigade guarding the coast railway from Alexandria to Da'aba. The Essex battalions were relieved from this duty on 4 March 1916 by the 2nd County of London Yeomanry and moved into the No 1 (Southern) Section of the Suez Canal Defences.

==== Sinai and Palestine ====
During 1916, the units of 54th Division were steadily brought up to strength by the arrival of drafts, and in mid-January 1917 the division assembled for the opening of the Palestine Campaign. It took the whole of February for 161 Bde to cross the Sinai Desert in stages. It was then involved in all three Battles of Gaza, in March, April and November 1917.

At the First Battle of Gaza (26 March 1917), the main attack was made by 53rd (Welsh) Division with 161 Bde in support. Towards the end of the day the brigade was ordered to take Green Hill: despite heavy fighting the attack was a complete success and the brigade held the whole position by nightfall. However, confusion set in, and 53rd Division withdrew during the night. The men of 161 Bde were enraged by the order to withdraw. Over 100 men from the 1/6th and 1/7th Bns were posted missing after the fighting withdrawal.

For the Second Battle of Gaza (17–19 April 1917), 161 Bde was in divisional reserve and only suffered a few casualties from shellfire while the rest of 54th Division was badly cut up in the failed main assault.

During the summer months 161 Bde held the line without suffering serious casualties, and by the end of October was fully up to strength for the forthcoming Third Battle of Gaza (1–3 November 1917). On the morning of 2 November, the 54th Division put in a holding attack at the El Arish Redoubt. The fighting was confused, but the division took all its objectives. During the rapid pursuit after the fall of Gaza, 1/6th assisted the ANZAC Mounted Division

As well as battle casualties, the whole brigade suffered considerably from influenza during November–December 1917 and throughout 1918. The weakened brigade was mainly engaged in line-holding until September 1918. 54th Division was held in readiness to move to reinforce the Western Front, but in the end was not sent.

54th Division returned to the offensive for the Battle of Megiddo (19–25 September 1918), which finally broke the Turkish resistance. To support the breakthrough, 161 Bde was to secure the Es Zakur line and then form a defensive flank. The brigade formed up before dawn on 19 September, with 1/6th Bn in the second line. Covered by an overhead barrage from the machine gun companies, the first line took the two objectives successfully, with the second line close up in support. The main assault completely broke through the Turkish lines and opened the way for the cavalry to pursue the defeated enemy. 161 Brigade was left behind for a week on battlefield clearance before joining the pursuit. By the time the Armistice with Turkey was signed on 30 October 1918, 54th Division had reached Beirut.

==== Demobilisation ====
Soon after the Armistice, 54th Division moved back to Egypt by sea. Preparations for demobilisation began, but civil unrest in Egypt meant that 161 Bde was engaged in peacekeeping duties from March to May 1919. After June the duties became very light and demobilisation proceeded. 1/6th Battalion was absorbed by 1/4th Bn, and the Essex Brigade was fully demobilised by Christmas 1919.

=== 2/6th Battalion ===
The 2/6th Essex Bn was formed at West Ham on 29 November 1914, initially comprising those members of the parent unit who had not volunteered for overseas service, together with recruits under training. In December it moved to Peterborough. At first the battalion only had .256-in Japanese Ariska rifles with which to train. With the duty of finding drafts for the 1/6th Bn overseas, and with the Home Service men removed to form Provisional Battalions, the battalion's strength dropped to a low level. In 1916 it was brought up to strength with Derby Scheme men and expected to be sent overseas, but instead it continued to provide drafts to other battalions. It served in 206th (2nd Essex) Brigade in 69th (2nd East Anglian) Division on Home Defence, at Thetford in the summer of 1915, at Welbeck in summer 1916 and to Stockton-on-Tees for the winter of 1917. The battalion was disbanded at Stockton on 31 January 1918.

=== 3/6th Battalion ===
The 3/6th Bn was formed at West Ham on 15 May 1915 to act as a reserve for the 1st and 2nd Bns. It moved to Windsor Great Park with the other Essex Regiment 3rd Bns in August that year, and then to Halton Park in October. In April 1916, its title was altered to 6th Reserve Bn Essex Regiment, and on 1 September it was absorbed by the 4th Reserve Bn in the East Anglian Reserve Brigade.

=== 16th Battalion ===
In 1915, the 'Home Service-only' and unfit men of the TF were formed into Provisional units for home defence. The Essex Regiment formed three such battalions, with the men of 6th Bn and some of 5th Bn forming the 66th Provisional Battalion in 3rd Provisional Brigade. The 3rd Provisional Bde was attached to 69th (2nd East Anglian) Division in the area around Thetford, Norfolk, Newmarket and Bury St Edmunds in Suffolk. In March 1916 the brigade came under Northern Army in Norfolk, where 66th Provisional Bn was stationed at Cley next the Sea, later at Darsham. When the Military Service Act 1916 swept away the Home/Overseas Service distinction, all TF soldiers became liable for drafting overseas if medically fit, and the provisional battalions became numbered battalions of their parent regiments on 1 January 1917. 66th Provisional Battalion became 16th Battalion, Essex Regiment at Fleet, Hampshire, where it joined 6th Provisional Brigade, which was expanded to form 71st Division. The battalion joined 213th Brigade and moved to Colchester in March, where it was disbanded on 21 December 1917.

=== Local Guards ===
Local Guard or Protection companies were formed in late 1914 to protect vital points. These were manned by members of the National Reserve, made up of former soldiers and TF members whose reserve liability had ended but had volunteered for further service. Those around Essex and along the Thames Estuary became supernumerary companies of the 6th Essex from February 1915:

- No 1 Co at Abbey Mills, Stratford
- No 3 Co at Bishop's Stortford, Hertfordshire (from Chelmsford)
- No 4 Co at Chelmsford
- No 6 Co at Lexden (from Witham)
- No 8 Co at Mistley
- No 9 Co at Longfield Camp (from Dartford, Kent)
- No 10 Co at Wellingborough, Northamptonshire (from Rainham, Essex)
- No 11 Co at Lessness Park, Abbey Wood, Woolwich (from Dartford)
- No 12 Co at West Ham
- No 13 Co at Waltham Abbey
- No 14 Co at Marconi Works, Chelmsford, with detachment as ferry guard at Farnbridge Ferry

When the Royal Defence Corps was constituted in May 1916,

- Nos 1 and 12 became 107th Co RDC
- Nos 3,4 and 6 became 44th Co RDC
- No 8 became 57th Co RDC
- No 9 became 64th Co RDC
- No 11 became 122nd Co RDC
- No 13 (with 9th Middlesex Co) became 149th Co RDC

== Interwar ==
When the TF was reconstituted on 7 February 1920, the 6th Bn Essex Regiment was reformed. The Battalion Headquarters, Headquarters Wing and three Rifle Companies, "A", "B" and "C" were raised at the Cedars, whilst "D" Company and the Battalion Signals Platoon were raised at 110 East Street, Prittlewell. Once again, it was in 161st (Essex) Brigade of 54th (East Anglian) Division. The TF was reorganised as the Territorial Army (TA) the following year.

In the 1930s, the increasing need for anti-aircraft (AA) defence, particularly for South East England, was addressed by converting a number of TA infantry battalions to the AA role, the 6th Essex converting to the searchlight role on 1 November 1938. Concurrently, the TA was being doubled in size after the Munich Crisis, so the 6th Essex once again formed 1/6th and 2/6th battalions, organised as follows:

1/6th Bn Essex Regiment (64th Searchlight Regiment)

- HQ, 441 and 442 SL Coys at the Cedars, West Ham, raised from Bn HQ, HQ Wing, A, B and C Coys, 6th Essex.
- 443 SL Coy at Chingford, raised as a new unit and housed from early 1939 in a new Drill Hall built at Mount Road.

2/6th Bn Essex Regiment (65th Searchlight Regiment)

- HQ and 444 SL Coy at the Drill Hall, 110 East Street, Prittlewell, Southend-on-Sea, raised by conversion of "D" Coy, 6th Essex.
- 445 SL Coy at East Ham, raised by the transfer of two Sections of 310 (Essex) SL Coy RE (TA) and personnel from 6th Essex at West Ham. In the summer of 1939, the Company moved to a newly built Drill Hall on Vicarage Lane, East Ham.
- 446 SL Coy at Prittlewell, raised by transfer of No.3 Coy, 54th (East Anglian) Divisional Signals, less two Sections at the Drill Hall, Brooke Road, Grays formed by the transfer of the Grays Detachment of the Essex Fortress RE (TA).

Unlike earlier TA infantry battalions converted to the searchlight role, these two were not transferred to the Royal Engineers but remained part of the Essex Regiment. On the outbreak of war in September 1939, both units were in 41st (London) Anti-Aircraft Brigade of 2nd AA Division.

Each Battalion also had attached to it a Company of the Auxiliary Territorial Service, who trained alongside them at their respective Drill Halls, 4th Essex Company ATS at the Cedars and 5th Essex Company ATS at Prittlewell.

== Second World War ==
All TA searchlight units were transferred to the Royal Artillery (RA) on 1 August 1940, the two 6th Essex units being designated 64th (Essex Regiment) Searchlight Regiment, RA (TA), and 65th (Essex Regiment) Searchlight Regiment, RA (TA) respectively. They retained their Essex Regiment cap badges and buttons.

=== 64th (Essex Regiment) Searchlight Regiment ===
Formation sign of 2 AA Division, won by both regiments until 1942.

By August 1940, the regiment had transferred from 41 to 40 AA Bde, which had the role of defending airfields in Eastern England during the Battle of Britain and The Blitz.

The newly formed 512 S/L Bty was regimented with 64 S/L Rgt on 10 December 1940, but 10 days later was ordered to join the new 84 S/L Rgt instead. At the beginning of 1941, 64 S/L Rgt sent a cadre of experienced officers and men to 237 S/L Training Rgt at Holywood, Northern Ireland, where, on 12 January, they formed 543 S/L Bty with recruits mainly from Manchester. This battery then formed part of 89th S/L Rgt until December 1941, when it moved to Kent, later joining 33rd (St Pancras) S/L Rgt.

The regiment remained with 40 AA Bde in 2 AA Division (later 5 AA Group when the AA Divisions were disbanded at the end of September 1942) until August 1943 when it joined 31 AA Bde in 5 AA Group, and then moved to 50 AA Bde in the same Group by March 1944. On 1 June 1944, the regiment was joined by E Troop of 398 S/L Bty from 49th (The West Yorkshire Regiment) S/L Rgt, which became E Trp of 441 S/L Bty.

By the end of 1944, the German Luftwaffe was suffering from such shortages of pilots, aircraft and fuel that serious aerial attacks on the United Kingdom could be discounted and the War Office began reorganising surplus AA units in the UK into infantry battalions for duties in the rear areas. Meanwhile, 21st Army Group fighting in North West Europe was suffering a severe manpower shortage, particularly among the infantry. In January 1945, the War Office accelerated the conversion of surplus artillery into infantry units, primarily for line of communication and occupation duties, thereby releasing trained infantry for frontline service. 64th S/L Regiment was selected for conversion on 23 January 1945, and redesignated 639 (Essex Regiment) Infantry Regiment, RA, with five 'batteries' designated A to E.

639 Regiment joined 305 Infantry Bde (itself converted from an AA Bde). After infantry training, including a short period attached to 55th (West Lancashire) Infantry Division, 305 Bde came under the orders of 21st Army Group on 18 April 1945, and landed on the Continent two days later. 639 (Essex) Rgt passed into suspended animation on 31 October 1945.

=== 65th (Essex Regiment) Searchlight Regiment ===
This regiment remained in 41 AA Bde, defending East Anglia during the Blitz. It supplied a cadre to 233rd S/L Training Rgt at Saighton Camp where it provided the basis for a new 526 S/L Bty formed on 14 November 1940. This battery later joined 86th S/L Rgt. 65 Searchlight Rgt remained with 41 AA Bde in 2 AA Division until late 1941 when it moved to 32 AA Bde in the same division (later 5 AA Group). In the summer of 1943, it moved to 50 AA Bde, and then by March 1944 to 65 AA Bde, still in 5 AA Group.

The regiment was ordered into suspended animation on 27 September 1944, but this order was cancelled on 1 November. Instead, on 4 November 1944, the regiment was also converted to infantry as 65 (Essex Regiment) Garrison Regiment, RA, joining 21st Army Group. Subsequently, on 13 February 1945, it was redesignated as 607 (Essex Regiment) Infantry Regiment, RA.

On 12 February 1945, the surplus (older or unfit) men were sent to Bursledon, near Southampton, where 82nd S/L Rgt was acting as a holding unit. The former 64th S/L Rgt men constituted 483 S/L Bty within the regiment while they were awaiting posting or demobilisation. The regiment's Auxiliary Territorial Service (ATS) women were posted to AA brigade HQs. 607 (Essex) Rgt passed into suspended animation on 10 January 1946.

== Postwar ==
When the TA was reconstituted on 1 January 1947, both of the 6th Essex units reformed as heavy anti-aircraft (HAA) artillery Regiments. The 1/6th Battalion (64 SL Regt) was reconstituted as 599th (Mobile) HAA Regiment, RA (Essex Regiment) (TA). The Regimental Headquarters was established at the Drill Hall, Mount Road, Chingford and here was raised "P" and "Q" Batteries, the first Commanding Officer being Lt-Col Sir John Ruggles-Brise RA (TA), later Lord Lieutenant of Essex. The decision to transfer the bulk of the Regiment to Chingford was due to the heavy damage inflicted on the Cedars by enemy bombing in WW2, rendering it unable to house the complete Regiment. Therefore, only "R" Battery was raised at West Ham. A core of experienced Officers and SNCOs was found from pre-war members of 6th Essex. The Battery was under command of Major F O'Shanahun, with his brother Captain A G O'Shanahun as 2i/c and Captain Potter as Battery Captain. The first post-war Battery Sergeant Major was WO2 (BSM) W C Coe, with S/Sgt F Edwards as Battery Quartermaster Sergeant; Coe died suddenly in 1951 and BQMS Edwards succeeded him as BSM, with WO2 Bob Sippitt as Troop Sergeant Major, the Sippitt family had a long association with the TA in West Ham, Sidney Sippitt having served in 6th Essex and 64th SL Regt from 1920, also being the Drill Hall Caretaker and Bar Steward, with both sons Bob and George then serving in the Battery.

Meanwhile, the 2/6th Battalion had been reformed as 600th (Mobile) HAA Regiment, RA (The Essex Regiment) (TA) The Regimental Headquarters was established at the Drill Hall, Vicarage Lane, East Ham, initially with just "Q" Battery, whilst "P" Battery was raised at the Drill Hall, 110 East Street Prittlewell. "R" Battery was subsequently raised at East Ham in 1950. Initially, 599 HAA Regt was assigned to 52 (London) AA Bde based at Chingford, and 600 HAA Regt to 55 (East Anglian) AA Bde based at Barking, but both these formations were disbanded the following year.

In 1955, Anti-Aircraft Command was disbanded, and there were widespread mergers within the TA's AA regiments. Both 599 and 600 HAA regiments were absorbed into 459 (The Essex Regiment) HAA Regiment, which had originally been the 7th Bn Essex Regiment. Regimental HQ and part of 'P' Battery were formed at East Ham from 600 Regt, while 'Q' Battery was formed at Chingford from 599 Regt. The Cedars was demolished around this time and a new modern Drill Hall built on the site became home to a Company of the London Rifle Brigade. This remains in use by the Army Reserve as a base for 7th Battalion The Rifles. After another round of mergers with East London units in 1961, the Essex lineage was discontinued.

== Battle honours ==
The battalion was awarded the Battle Honour South Africa 1900–1902 in recognition of the volunteers who served in the 2nd Boer War. During the First World War, it contributed to the honours of its parent regiment. One of the ten First World War honours selected to be displayed on the King's Colour was Gaza, which was won solely by the TF battalions of 161 Bde. The Royal Artillery does not receive battle honours, so none were awarded for services in the Second World War.

== Commanding officers ==
Commanding officers of the battalion included:

- Capt Charles Capper, appointed 30 January 1860 (Lt-Col of 2nd Admin Bn 19 June 1860)
- Lt-Col William Strange-Mure, appointed 20 January 1869
- Lt-Col George R. Birt, appointed 25 September 1872 (continued in command of 3rd VB after 1883)

== Prominent members ==
- Anthony Palmer (1819–92), who had won a Victoria Cross as a private in the Grenadier Guards at the Battle of Inkerman in 1854, was appointed captain in the 5th Essex RVC on 6 May 1874.

== Online sources ==
- British Army units from 1945 on
- British Military History
- The Long, Long Trail
- The Regimental Warpath 1914–1918
- Land Forces of Britain, the Empire and Commonwealth (Regiments.org)
- The Royal Artillery 1939–45
- Graham Watson, The Territorial Army 1947
