= 69th (2nd East Anglian) Division =

British Army division

2nd East Anglian Division 69th (2nd East Anglian) Division 69th Division
- Active: 24 November 1914–17 March 1919
- Country: United Kingdom
- Branch: British Army
- Type: Infantry
- Size: Division
- Service: World War I

Commanders
- Notable commanders: Brigadier-General W.F. Cavaye; Major-General C. Ross; Major-General Sir R. Fanshawe

The 2nd East Anglian Division was a 2nd Line Territorial Force division of the British Army in World War I. The division was formed as a duplicate of the 54th (East Anglian) Division in November 1914. As the name suggests, the division recruited in East Anglia, particularly Essex, Norfolk, and Suffolk, but also Bedfordshire, Cambridgeshire, Hertfordshire, and Northamptonshire. In August 1915, in common with all Territorial Force divisions, it was numbered as 69th (2nd East Anglian) Division. By January 1918 it had been extensively reorganized and lost its territorial identity; henceforth it was known as 69th Division.

It served on home defence duties throughout the war, whilst recruiting, training and supplying drafts to overseas units and formations. Initially, it was stationed in East Anglia, but from June 1916 it was in Northern Command. It never left England and was eventually disbanded in March 1919.

== History ==
In accordance with the Territorial and Reserve Forces Act 1907 (7 Edw.7, c.9) which brought the Territorial Force into being, the TF was intended to be a home defence force for service during wartime and members could not be compelled to serve outside the country. However, on the outbreak of war on 4 August 1914, many members volunteered for Imperial Service. Therefore, TF units were split into 1st Line (liable for overseas service) and 2nd Line (home service for those unable or unwilling to serve overseas) units. 2nd Line units performed the home defence role, although in fact most of these were also posted abroad in due course.

On 15 August 1915, TF units were instructed to separate home service men from those who had volunteered for overseas service (1st Line), with the home service personnel to be formed into reserve units (2nd Line). On 31 August, 2nd Line units were authorized for each 1st Line unit where more than 60% of men had volunteered for overseas service. After being organized, armed and clothed, the 2nd Line units were gradually grouped into large formations thereby forming the 2nd Line divisions. These 2nd Line units and formations had the same name and structure as their 1st Line parents. On 24 November, it was decided to replace imperial service (1st Line) formations as they proceeded overseas with their reserve (2nd Line) formations. A second reserve (3rd Line) unit was then formed at the peace headquarters of the 1st Line.

As a result, the 2nd East Anglian Division was formed in November 1914 with the 2nd Essex, 2nd East Midland and 2nd Norfolk and Suffolk Brigades as a 2nd Line duplicate of the East Anglian Division.

== Order of battle ==
=== Organisation, November 1915 ===
Organisation in November 1915 after reorganization when all 2nd Line formations became liable for overseas service.

206th (2nd Essex) Brigade

2/4th Battalion, Essex Regiment
2/5th Battalion, Essex Regiment
2/6th Battalion, Essex Regiment
2/7th Battalion, Essex Regiment

Royal Field Artillery

2/I East Anglian Brigade

2/1st Norfolk Battery
2/2nd Norfolk Battery
2/3rd Norfolk Battery
2/I East Anglian Brigade Ammunition Column

2/II East Anglian Brigade

2/1st Essex Battery
2/2nd Essex Battery
2/3rd Essex Battery
2/II East Anglian Brigade Ammunition Column

2/III East Anglian (H) Brigade

2/1st Suffolk (H) Battery
2/2nd Suffolk (H) Battery
2/III East Anglian (H) Brigade Ammunition Column

2/IV East Anglian Brigade

2/1st Hertfordshire Battery
2/2nd Hertfordshire Battery
2/1st Northamptonshire Battery
2/IV East Anglian Brigade Ammunition Column

Divisional troops

2/1st Hertfordshire Yeomanry
69th (2/1st East Anglian) Divisional Cyclist Company

Royal Engineers

3/1st East Anglian Field Company
2/2nd East Anglian Field Company
1/3rd East Anglian Field Company
69th (2/1st East Anglian) Divisional Signal Company

Royal Army Medical Corps

2/2nd East Anglian Field Ambulance
2/3rd East Anglian Field Ambulance

69th (2/1st East Anglian) Divisional Train, ASC

553rd Company
554th Company
555th Company
556th Company

207th (2nd East Midland) Brigade

2/5th Battalion, Bedfordshire Regiment
2/4th Battalion, Northamptonshire Regiment
2/1st Battalion, Cambridgeshire Regiment
2/1st Battalion, Hertfordshire Regiment

208th (2nd Norfolk and Suffolk) Brigade

2/4th Battalion, Norfolk Regiment
2/5th Battalion, Norfolk Regiment
2/4th Battalion, Suffolk Regiment
2/5th Battalion, Suffolk Regiment

== Commanders ==
The 69th (2nd East Anglian) Division had the following commanders:

From	Rank	Name
24 November 1914	Brigadier-General	W.F. Cavaye
14 November 1915	Major-General	F.H. Kelly
3 February 1917	Brigadier-General	F.A. Fortescue (acting)
18 February 1917	Major-General	F.H. Kelly
8 September 1917	Major-General	C. Ross
4 November 1918	Major-General	Sir R. Fanshawe

== See also ==
- 54th (East Anglian) Division for the 1st Line formation
- List of British divisions in World War I

== Bibliography ==
- Becke, Archibald F. (1937). Order of Battle of Divisions Part 2B. The 2nd-Line Territorial Force Divisions (57th–69th) with The Home-Service Divisions (71st–73rd) and 74th and 75th Divisions. London: HMSO. OCLC 4405016.
- Farndale, General Sir Martin (1988). The Forgotten Fronts and the Home Base, 1914–18. History of the Royal Regiment of Artillery. Woolwich: The Royal Artillery Institution. ISBN 1-870114-05-1.
- James, Brigadier E.A. (1978). British Regiments 1914–18. London: Samson Books Limited. ISBN 0-906304-03-2.
- Rinaldi, Richard A (2008). Order of Battle of the British Army 1914. Ravi Rikhye. ISBN 978-0-97760728-0.
