= Sydney Lawford =

British Army general

Lieutenant-General Sir Sydney Lawford KCB
- Born: 16 November 1865; Tunbridge Wells, Kent, England
- Died: 15 February 1953 (aged 87)
- Military career
- Allegiance: United Kingdom
- Branch: British Army
- Service years: 1885–1926
- Rank: Lieutenant-General
- Nickname: "Swanky Syd"
- Unit: Royal Fusiliers
- Commands: Essex Brigade; 22nd Infantry Brigade; 41st Division
- Conflicts: Second Boer War; First World War
- Awards: Knight Commander of the Order of the Bath

Lieutenant-General Sir Sydney Turing Barlow Lawford, KCB (16 November 1865 – 15 February 1953) was a British Army officer and the father of Hollywood actor Peter Lawford.

== Early life ==
Lawford was born on 16 November 1865 at Tunbridge Wells in the county of Kent in England, the son of Thomas Acland Lawford. He was educated at Windlesham House School from 1870 to 1878 and thereafter at Wellington College.

== Early military career ==
After receiving military training at Royal Military College at Sandhurst, he received a commission as a subaltern with the rank of lieutenant into the 7th Battalion, Royal Fusiliers (City of London Regiment), on 7 February 1885.

He was promoted to captain on 3 September 1894 and was appointed adjutant of the 5th (Militia) Battalion, Royal Fusiliers, on 8 December 1896.

He served in South Africa in the Second Boer War, which began in October 1899, commanding the 19th Battalion of mounted infantry, and was promoted to major on augmentation on 21 November 1900. On 1 March 1901 he was employed as a special service officer in order to serve with the mounted infantry, being graded as a deputy assistant adjutant general (DAAG) while employed in this role.

Following the end of the war in May 1902, caused by the Treaty of Vereeniging, he received the brevet rank of lieutenant colonel on 22 August 1902, before he returned home on the SS Briton the following month. On 28 May 1907 he was appointed assistant commandant of the School of Instruction for Mounted Infantry at Longmoor, Hampshire. On 22 August 1908, while still at the school, he was promoted to brevet colonel.

He was promoted to substantive lieutenant colonel on 25 October 1910 and became the commandant of the School of Instruction for Mounted Infantry, where he had served just a few years earlier, taking over from Colonel Edward Ingouville-Williams on 18 June 1912. He received a promotion to substantive colonel with effect from the same date. On 1 April 1913 he relinquished this position and was placed on the half-pay list. On 30 June, however, he returned to active service when he succeeded Brigadier General Edward Bulfin in command of the Essex Brigade of the Territorial Force (TF), part of the East Anglian Division.

== First World War ==
Upon the mobilisation of the TF in August 1914, shortly after the British entry into World War I, Lawford was promoted to the temporary rank of brigadier general on 5 August and continued to command his brigade.

On 7 September, he became the first general officer commanding (GOC) of the newly organised 22nd Infantry Brigade, which formed part of the 7th Division under Major General Thompson Capper. Lawford led the brigade through the division's initial engagements while serving with the British Expeditionary Force (BEF) on the Western Front, most notably the First Battle of Ypres, "during which he personally led attacks, sometimes on horseback, armed only with a cane". In February 1915, he was appointed a Companion of the Order of the Bath (CB) "for services rendered in connection with Operations in the Field".

Throughout the early months of 1915, he led his brigade through the battles of Neuve Chapelle, Aubers Ridge, and Festubert. During 1915, Lawford twice served as acting commander of the 7th Division during the absence of Capper. He first served as acting GOC from 6 to 19 April 1915, shortly before the commencement of the Second Battle of Ypres. He handed over divisional command to Major General Hubert Gough on 19 April, returning to lead the 22nd Brigade during the ensuing battle. He resumed acting command of the 7th Division for a second time, this time lasting from 14 to 19 July, until Capper's return from convalescence.

In September 1915, Lawford was promoted to temporary major general and appointed GOC of the newly formed 41st Division, the most junior division of the New Armies created by Field Marshal Lord Kitchener. Somewhat unusually, he would serve as its GOC for the rest of the conflict, ending the war "as the longest serving divisional commander in the British Expeditionary Force".

He oversaw the division's initial training in England and its 1916 deployment to France, leading them during the Battle of the Somme, specifically at Flers–Courcelette. He was promoted to the substantive rank of major general on 1 January 1917, "for distinguished service in the field".

He continued to lead his division throughout 1917. He led his division through the Battle of Messines and the Battle of Passchendaele before being redeployed to the Italian Front in November, remaining there until March 1918 during which he was knighted in the field when his CB was upgraded to a Knight Commander of the Order of the Bath (KCB) in January 1918 "for valuable services rendered in connection with Military Operations in the Field".

After returning to France, he led the division through the German spring offensive and the final Hundred Days Offensive, which ultimately led to the Armistice of 11 November 1918 and the end of the war.

His military nickname was "Swanky Syd", apparently derived from his habit of donning full dress regalia, including all of his medal entitlement, regularly. General Sir Douglas Haig, then commanding the First Army of the BEF, noted in his personal diary in early 1915 the following assessment of Lawford, then still commanding the 22nd Brigade, as a commander:

I was at Sandhurst with Lawford, ... although endowed with no great ability, he is hard fighting and plucky.

== Postwar and final years ==
After the war Lawford led his 41st Division into Germany as part of the British Army of the Rhine (BAOR) occupation force. He remained at the head of the division through the post-war transition until the unit was officially broken up and demobilised on 15 March 1919, when he relinquished command.

He was posted to British India and commanded a brigade of the British Indian Army from 26 March 1920. He then commanded the Lahore District from 2 November 1920. Having been promoted to the rank of lieutenant general on 3 January 1923 he took command of the Lahore District on 3 April 1923 before retiring from the army three years later on 3 April 1926.

He ceased to belong to the reserve of officers on 16 November 1932.

Lawford died in California in the United States at the age of 87 on 15 February 1953.

== Personal life ==
Lawford led a somewhat complicated private life. His first marriage was on 30 September 1893, at St. Paul's Church, Knightsbridge, London, to Lillian Maud Cass, who died on 26 November 1900. His second marriage was on 20 May 1914 in London to Muriel Williams. While serving in India in the early 1920s, and while still married to Muriel, he fell in love with the wife of one of his officers, May Somerville Aylen (4 November 1883 – 23 January 1972), and she became pregnant with his child. Colonel Ernest Aylen, May's husband, upon hearing this news, divorced her over the scandal. General Lawford and Muriel divorced. He then married May Aylen, and their child, the actor Peter Lawford, was born in 1923, when his father was 57 years of age. The Lawfords returned to England but the scandal eventually drove the family to settle in France, and they then moved to the United States in the late 1930s.
