= Essex Brigade =

Essex Brigade 161st (Essex) Brigade 161st Infantry Brigade 161st Independent Infantry Brigade
- Active: 1888–1919; 1921–1941; 1947–1967
- Country: United Kingdom
- Branch: Territorial Army
- Type: Infantry
- Size: Brigade
- Part of: 54th (East Anglian) Infantry Division
- Engagements: Gallipoli Campaign; Senussi Campaign; Battle of Romani; First Battle of Gaza; Second Battle of Gaza; Third Battle of Gaza; Battle of Megiddo (1918)

Commanders
- Notable commanders: Col Edward Bulfin; Brig-Gen Sydney Lawford

The Essex Brigade, later 161st Brigade and 161st Infantry Brigade, was a volunteer infantry formation of the British Army in existence from 1888 until 1941, and again from 1947. It served at Gallipoli and in Palestine during the First World War and returned to Egypt in the early part of the Second World War before transferring to the British Indian Army and redesignated 161st Indian Infantry Brigade. In both peacetime and during the wars, the brigade was an integral part of the 54th (East Anglian) Infantry Division and contained mostly battalions of the Essex Regiment.

== Precursors ==
The Cardwell Reforms introduced the concept of 'localisation of the forces', whereby the country was divided into county sub-districts organised round the newly linked Line infantry battalions, to which the Militia and Volunteer Corps of the county were attached. The County of Essex was covered by Brigade No 44 based on the depot of the 44th Foot, later the Essex Regiment, at Warley Barracks.

Under a short-lived mobilisation scheme around 1880, the volunteers in Essex were organised into two local Brigades:

Local Brigade No 5

- HQ: Brightlingsea
- 4 Batteries of 1st Essex Artillery Volunteer Corps (AVC) at Stratford
- 2nd Essex Rifle Volunteer Corps (RVC) at Chelmsford
- 3rd Essex RVC at Plaistow

Local Brigade No 6

- HQ: Southend-on-Sea
- 4 Batteries of 1st Essex AVC at Stratford
- 1st Essex RVC at Ilford
- 4th Essex RVC at Silvertown

In 1883, the RVCs formally became Volunteer Battalions (VBs) of their linked county regiment.

== Volunteer Brigade ==
The more complete mobilisation scheme introduced by the Stanhope Memorandum of December 1888 saw all the Volunteer units assigned to garrisons or mobile brigades. The four VBs of the Essex Regiment constituted the Essex Volunteer Brigade and in the event of war were expected to mobilise at an 'entrenched camp' based on the regiment's depot at Warley Barracks.

- 1st Volunteer Battalion, Essex Regiment
- 2nd Volunteer Battalion, Essex Regiment
- 3rd Volunteer Battalion, Essex Regiment
- 4th Volunteer Battalion, Essex Regiment
- Supply Detachment (later termed an Army Service Corps Company)
- Bearer Company (later Royal Army Medical Corps)

Initially, the brigade was commanded by the officer commanding 44th Regimental District (the Essex Regiment's depot), but afterwards Lt-Col P.C. Yorke, recently retired from the King's Own Royal Lancaster Regiment, was appointed. The brigade historian recorded that Yorke was a 'smart and keen soldier' who did a lot for the brigade in its early days, but whose term of command was short because he died in office. He was replaced by Colonel J.F. Hornby, late of the 12th Lancers, who held the post until the reorganisation of the volunteer infantry brigades in 1906. He was followed by Colonel Harry Cooper, CMG, CBE, who had seen active service in Canada, Ashanti, Burma, Sudan and South Africa, and went on to serve at General Headquarters of the British Expeditionary Force (BEF) in France during the First World War. Brigade headquarters was established at Epping Place, Epping, the home of the brigade major, Maj H.W.W. Wood.

During the Second Boer War, detachments of volunteers from the brigade served with the City Imperial Volunteers and in the 112-strong Special Service Company serving alongside the Regulars of the 1st Battalion, Essex Regiment in the first part of the war, followed by a second company of 101 men in 1901–02.

== Territorial Force ==
Under the Haldane Reforms, the Volunteer Force was subsumed into the Territorial Force (TF), the Volunteer battalions becoming numbered battalions of their parent units. The Essex Brigade now formed part of the East Anglian Division of the TF. Brigade HQ was at Brentwood. The units of East Anglian Division trained together for the first time at camp near Thetford in 1911.

== First World War ==
=== Mobilisation ===
The East Anglian Division was a week into its fortnight's annual training at Clacton when the order to mobilise arrived on 4 August 1914. The units immediately proceeded to their designated war stations defending the East Anglian coast, with 7th Essex at Felixstowe. They were relieved on 9 August to return to Walthamstow to mobilise, and by 10 August the division was concentrated around Brentwood, with 7th Battalion HQ at the 'Golden Fleece' inn. It later moved to the cavalry barracks in Norwich, and then Costessey Hall.

Although recruiting was brisk, the Essex men were enlisted for Home Service and only afterwards asked if they wished to volunteer for Overseas Service, which many did not. Hence the reserve or 2nd-Line battalions filled up quickly, while the 1st-Line battalions remained under strength. However, in August 1914, the Essex Brigade formed a service battalion of volunteers from all four battalions. This was put at 24 hours notice for service in France, but was stood down in November and the men returned to their battalions. In January 1915, the 2nd-Line battalions formed a 2nd Essex Brigade, which was later numbered 206th (2nd Essex) Brigade but never went overseas.

The East Anglian division was employed on coast defence until May 1915, when it concentrated around St Albans to prepare for overseas service. At this time, it was numbered, becoming the 54th (East Anglian) Division, and the Essex Brigade became 161st (Essex) Brigade. On 8 July, it heard that it was to be employed at Gallipoli.

=== Order of Battle ===
161st Brigade comprised the following units during the war:

- 1/4th Battalion, Essex Regiment
- 1/5th Battalion, Essex Regiment
- 1/6th Battalion, Essex Regiment
- 1/7th Battalion, Essex Regiment
- 161st Brigade Machine-Gun Company, Machine Gun Corps (formed 23 April 1916, moved to 54th Battalion Machine Gun Corps 19 April 1918)
- 161st Trench Mortar Battery (formed 17 May 1917)

=== Insignia ===
During the war, the brigade adopted shoulder flashes coloured red and black, divided vertically, with the red worn to the front on each arm. The four battalions adopted distinctive shapes for these patches:

- 4th Battalion: circle
- 5th Battalion: triangle
- 6th Battalion: horizontal rectangle
- 7th Battalion: square

=== Gallipoli ===
161st Brigade sailed from Devonport, Devon between 21 and 26 July 1915 and assembled at Mudros. The rest of 54th Division landed at Suvla Bay on 10 August in a last attempt to restart the stalled Gallipoli Campaign, but was misused and stalemate ensued. 161st Brigade (less 1/4th Essex) landed during the night of 11/12 August and relieved 163rd (Norfolk and Suffolk) Brigade who were to make an attack. The Essex battalions arrived still understrength, and armed with obsolete long Lee–Enfield rifles – many soldiers exchanged these for modern SMLE weapons picked up from casualties. On the afternoon of 14 August, the brigade advanced over open ground to relieve the Norfolks and Suffolks after their disastrous attack. The Essex Brigade's historian records that 'Though they were met with a fusillade as they advanced steadily over the plain there was no hesitation'. They reached the line and spent all night consolidating the position.

On 17/18 August, the brigade (now completed by the arrival of 1/4th Battalion) relieved the 10th (Irish) Division at Kiretch Tepe. Intermittent shellfire on these positions caused considerable casualties before the brigade was relieved on 22 August. The brigade then moved to the Lala Baba sector, and from 1 to 10 September interchanged with parties of the 4th Australian Brigade, some holding positions known as 'Table Top', and 'Rhododendron Spur', others working on new trenches.

Throughout September and October 1915, 54th Division made preparations to complete the capture of Hill 60 sector, described by one of the officers as 'notoriously one of the most unpleasant spots on the peninsula'. The main task was assigned to 163rd Brigade, which was strengthened by 1/7th Essex, the 1/8th Battalion, Hampshire Regiment being transferred to 161st Brigade in exchange for three months. However, although a mine was exploded under Hill 60, the main operation was cancelled because of the weak state of 54 Division: during September to November 1915, 161st Brigade lost 2 officers and 33 other ranks killed and 8 officers and 103 men wounded, but in the same period 45 officers and 1,659 other ranks were admitted to hospital sick.

On the night of 26/27 November, the 161st (Essex) Brigade was relieved by Gurkhas and the New Zealand Mounted Rifles Brigade, the relief being delayed by a severe rainstorm that flooded the trenches. After a few days in the rest area, 54 Division marched down to the beach and embarked for Mudros, where the battalions reverted to their former brigades. It did not return to the peninsula, which was later evacuated, and instead the division sailed to Alexandria.

=== Egypt ===
As soon as it arrived in Egypt, 161st Brigade became involved in the Senussi Campaign, marching out on 28 December to replace the New Zealand Rifle Brigade guarding the coast railway from Alexandria to Da'aba. The Essex battalions were relieved from this duty on 4 March 1916 by the 2nd County of London Yeomanry and moved into the No 1 (Southern) Section of the Suez Canal Defences.

The Brigade Machine Gun Company was formed at Shallufah on 22–23 April by taking two officers and the machine-gun (MG) detachment from each battalion. The 8 Vickers machine guns thus collected were increased to 16 and the Essex men transferred to the Machine Gun Corps

In August, the troops were moved northwards to counter a Turkish thrust at the canal, resulting in the Battle of Romani. 161st Machine Gun Company was the only unit of 54th Division engaged in this action, though 1/5th and 1/7th Essex were in the area. On 5 August, supporting 52nd (Lowland) Division round Mount Rowston, the company took part in the decisive action of the battle, resisting a stiff attack in which it suffered several casualties, and won a number of gallantry awards.

=== Sinai and Palestine ===
During 1916, the units of 54 Division were steadily brought up to strength by the arrival of drafts, and in mid-January 1917 the division assembled for the opening of the Palestine Campaign. It took the whole of February for 161st Brigade to cross the Sinai Desert in stages. It was then involved in all three Battles of Gaza, in March, April and November 1917.

At the First Battle of Gaza (26 March 1917), the main attack was made by 53rd (Welsh) Division with 161st Brigade in support. Towards the end of the day, the Essex Brigade was ordered to take Green Hill: despite heavy fighting the attack was a complete success and the brigade held the whole position by nightfall. However, confusion set in, and 53rd Division withdrew during the night. The men of 161st Brigade were enraged by the order to withdraw. The following day patrols showed that the Turks had not reoccupied the position; 1/7th Bn was sent up to support the patrols, but a violent Turkish counter-attack finished the battle. The battalion's casualties at Green Hill were 228, of whom 68 were missing after the fighting withdrawal.

For the Second Battle of Gaza (17–19 April 1917), 1/7th Battalion was detached from 161st Brigade and was assigned to the Imperial Camel Corps (ICC), which was protecting the left flank of 54th Division. On 16 and 17 April the 1/7th Essex was escorting artillery. On 19 April, the battalion remained with the Hong Kong and Singapore Battery in support of the ICC's morning attack, and then at 10.30 pushed forward to help the right flank of 3rd (Australian) Camel Battalion when the Australian Light Horse retired. The rest of 161st Brigade was in divisional reserve and only suffered a few casualties from shellfire.. However, the main assault had failed again and Gaza remained untaken.

During the summer months, 161st Brigade held the line without suffering serious casualties, and recovered its strength for the forthcoming Third Battle of Gaza (1–3 November 1917). On the morning of 2 November, the 54th Division put in a holding attack at the El Arish Redoubt. The fighting was confused, but the division took all its objectives. However, the 1/7th Battalion found that the fourth objective, 'John Trench', was a mere scrape in the ground and could not be held. The brigade commander considered that this battalion had the hardest time of all that day. At 04.00, on 3 November, 1/7th made a renewed attempt to take their objective, but were again held up by Turkish machine-gun fire. The battalion's casualties over the three days were heavy, at 281 all ranks. During the rapid pursuit after the fall of Gaza, 1/4th and 1/6th Essex assisted the ANZAC Mounted Division, while 1/5th and 1/7th were left marching in the rear.

As well as battle casualties, the whole brigade suffered considerably from influenza during November–December 1917 and throughout 1918. The weakened brigade was mainly engaged in line-holding until September 1918. 54th Division was held in readiness to move to reinforce the Western Front, but in the end was not sent.

54th Division returned to the offensive for the Battle of Megiddo (19–25 September 1918), which finally broke the Turkish resistance. To support the breakthrough, 161st Brigade was to secure the Es Zakur line and then form a defensive flank. The brigade formed up before dawn on 19 September, and attacked under the cover of an overhead barrage from the machine gun companies. The brigade's first line took the two objectives successfully. The main assault completely broke through the Turkish lines and opened the way for the cavalry to pursue the defeated enemy. 161st Brigade was left behind for a week on battlefield clearance before joining the pursuit. By the time the Armistice with Turkey was signed on 30 October 1918, 54th Division had reached Beirut.

=== Demobilisation ===
Soon after the Armistice, 54th Division moved back to Egypt by sea. Preparations for demobilisation began, but civil unrest in Egypt meant that 161st Brigade was engaged in peacekeeping duties from March to May 1919. After June, the duties became very light and demobilisation proceeded. 1/7th Battalion was absorbed by 1/5th Battalion, and the Essex Brigade was fully demobilised by Christmas 1919.

== Between the wars ==
When the renamed Territorial Army (TA) was reconstituted in 1920–22, the 161st (Essex) Infantry Brigade reformed with the same four battalions of the Essex Regiment as before, in 54th (East Anglian) Divisional Area. During the 1930s, the air defences of the United Kingdom were strengthened, with a number of TA infantry battalions being converted to new roles: in 1935 the 7th Battalion, Essex Regiment was transferred to the Royal Artillery (RA) as 59th (The Essex Regiment) Anti-Aircraft Brigade, RA, (TA) and left 161st Brigade. They were replaced in the brigade by the 5th (Hackney) Battalion, Royal Berkshire Regiment, previously the 10th Battalion, the London Regiment (Hackney) from 1st London Infantry Brigade from The London Division.

After the 1938 Munich Agreement, the TA was doubled in size by duplicating units. The Essex Regiment chose to designate its battalions '1/' and '2/' as it did in the First World War. During 1939, the 6th Battalion, Essex Regiment duplicated with the 1/6th and 2/6th battalions becoming the 64th and 65th Searchlight Regiments respectively, but still remained part of the Essex Regiment. They were transferred to 41st (London) Anti-Aircraft Brigade, 2nd Anti-Aircraft Division, previously the 46th (North Midland) Division.

== Second World War ==
=== Order of Battle ===
161st Brigade had the following composition during the war:

- 1/4th Battalion, Essex Regiment – (until 20 July 1940; returned 4 January 1941)
- 1/5th Battalion, Essex Regiment – (until 14 December 1940; returned 13 September to 15 October 1941)
- 2/4th Battalion, Essex Regiment – (to 163rd Brigade 18 September 1939)
- 2/5th Battalion, Essex Regiment – (until 15 October 1941)
- 5th (Hackney) Battalion, Royal Berkshire Regiment – (to 163rd Brigade 18 September 1939)
- 7th (Stoke Newington) Battalion, Royal Berkshire Regiment – (to 163rd Brigade 18 September 1939)
- 161st Infantry Brigade Anti-Tank Company – (formed 10 July 1940; disbanded 16 September 1941)

Soon after the outbreak of the Second World War on 3 September 1939, 161st Brigade had been in the process of creating a duplicate or 2nd Line brigade. Shortly afterwards this was allocated the number 163 (replacing the original 163rd Brigade of 54th Division that had been renumbered 53rd Brigade and reassigned to a new 18th Division).

=== Service ===
The 54th (East Anglian) Infantry Division did not join the British Expeditionary Force in France, but remained part of Home Forces throughout 1939–40. In December 1940, 161st Brigade left the 54th Division and sailed to Sierra Leone in West Africa. Here, it was rejoined by 1/4th Essex, which had preceded it in July 1940.

The brigade was stationed in Sierra Leone from January to June 1941. It then travelled on to Egypt, arriving in July, where it came under Middle East Forces, spending short periods under command of 4th Indian Infantry Division, XIII Corps, and British Eighth Army, while most of its units were stripped away. In November 1941, Brigade HQ and 1/4th Essex sailed again to Cyprus, where it was joined by two Indian Army battalions and assigned to 5th Indian Division. On 26 November 1941, the brigade was transferred to the Indian Army as 161st Indian Infantry Brigade. As an Indian Army formation, it took part in the Western Desert and Burma campaigns, playing a large part in fighting the Imperial Japanese Army in the Siege of Kohima in mid-1944.

== Postwar ==
When the TA was reformed in 1947, 54th (East Anglian) was not reconstituted as a field division, but 161st Brigade was reformed as an independent infantry brigade in Eastern Command with the following composition:

161st Independent Infantry Brigade

- 4th Battalion, Royal Norfolk Regiment
- 4th Battalion, Suffolk Regiment
- 4th Battalion, Essex Regiment
- 161st Brigade Signals, Royal Corps of Signals
- 161st Brigade, Royal Army Service Corps
- 161st Brigade Workshop, Royal Electrical and Mechanical Engineers

In 1967, with the establishment of the Territorial Army Volunteer Reserve (TAVR), these battalions were reduced to small cadres.

== Commanders ==
Among the brigade's commanders were the following officers:

| Date | Rank | Name | Notes | Ref. |
|---|---|---|---|---|
| | Lieutenant-Colonel | P. C. Yorke | | |
| 18 March 1896 | Colonel | J. F. Hornby | | |
| | Colonel | W. Wood | | |
| 16 May 1902 | Lieutenant-Colonel | Thomas Stock | | |
| 1 June 1906 | Colonel | Harry Cooper | | |
| 1911 | Colonel | Edward Bulfin | | |
| 30 June 1913 | Colonel | S. T. B. Lawford | Later promoted brigadier-general | |
| 9 September 1914 | Brigadier-General | F. F. W. Daniell | | |
| 19 June 1916 | Brigadier-General | W. Marriott-Dodington | | |
| 24 July 1917 | Lieutenant-Colonel | John Brown | Acting | |
| 31 July 1917 | Brigadier-General | W. Marriott-Dodington | | |
| 8 February 1918 | Lieutenant-Colonel | B. C. Wells | Acting | |
| 12 February 1918 | Brigadier-General | H. B. H. Orpen-Palmer | | |
| 3 September 1939 | Brigadier | Hanbury Pawle | | |
| 13 November 1939 | Brigadier | J. W. L. Hobart | | |
| 25 November 1941 | Brigadier | W. D. Stamer | | |

== Online sources ==
- British Military History
- Essex Regiment & Essex Militia History
- The Long, Long Trail
- Orders of Battle at Patriot Files
- The Regimental Warpath 1914–1918
- Land Forces of Britain, the Empire and Commonwealth (Regiments.org)
- Graham Watson, The Territorial Army 1947
- British Army units from 1945 on
