= 163rd Infantry Brigade =

Norfolk and Suffolk Brigade 163rd (Norfolk and Suffolk) Brigade 163rd Infantry Brigade
- Active: 1908–1919; 1920–1943
- Country: United Kingdom
- Branch: Territorial Army
- Type: Infantry
- Size: Brigade
- Part of: 54th (East Anglian) Infantry Division
- Engagements: Gallipoli Campaign; Sinai and Palestine Campaign

The 163rd Infantry Brigade was an infantry brigade of the British Army that saw active service during the First World War in Gallipoli and the Middle Eastern Theatre as part of the 54th (East Anglian) Division. In the Second World War the brigade remained in the United Kingdom until it was disbanded in late 1943.

== History ==
=== Formation ===
The brigade was raised in 1908 upon the creation of the Territorial Force, originally as the Norfolk and Suffolk Brigade and was part of the East Anglian Division. The brigade consisted of two Volunteer battalions, the 4th and 5th, of the Norfolk Regiment and two, the 4th and 5th, of the Suffolk Regiment.

=== First World War ===
The division was mobilised on 5 August 1914, the day after Britain declared war on Germany. On 20 August the entire division moved to Chelmsford, Bury St Edmunds and Norwich. The division spent the next few months on home service and coastal defence and started training in preparation to eventually go overseas.

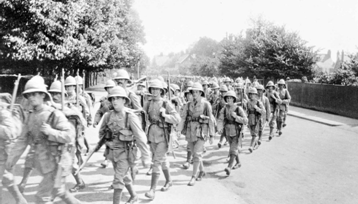
Men of the Sandringham Company, 1/5th Battalion, Norfolk Regiment, in tropical uniform, 1915.

In May 1915 the East Anglian Division was numbered as the 54th (East Anglian) Division and all the brigades in the division were also numbered—the Norfolk and Suffolk Brigade became 163rd (Norfolk and Suffolk) Brigade. As happened in all Territorial Force divisions, the battalions were also numbered and adopted the '1/' prefix (1/4th Suffolks), to distinguish them from their 2nd Line units which were being formed. The 2nd Line were initially intended to act as a draft-finding reserve for the 1st Line. They were the 208th (2/1st Norfolk and Suffolk) Brigade, 69th (2nd East Anglian) Division. In November 1914 the 1/4th Battalion, Suffolk Regiment was transferred to the 3rd (Lahore) Division of the British Indian Army and were replaced in the brigade by the 1/8th (Isle of Wight Rifles) Battalion, Hampshire Regiment, which was previously unattached to a field formation.

In July 1915 the division was ordered to prepare for overseas service. The brigade served with the 54th Division in the Middle Eastern theatre and fought in the Gallipoli Campaign, landing at Suvla Bay on 10 August 1915, as part of IX Corps. During the fighting on 12 August the 1/5th Norfolks

"...were on the right of the line", wrote Sir Ian Hamilton, commanding all forces in the region "and found themselves for a moment less strongly opposed than the rest of the brigade. Against the yielding forces of the enemy Colonel Sir Horace Beauchamp, a bold, self-confident officer, eagerly pressed forward, followed by the best part of the battalion. The fighting grew hotter, and the ground became more wooded and broken. At this stage many men were wounded, or grew exhausted with thirst. These found their way back to camp during the night. But the colonel, with sixteen officers and 250 men, still kept pushing on, driving all the enemy before them. Nothing more was ever seen or heard of any of them. They charged into the forest and were lost to sight or sound. Not one of them ever came back."

The men, the so-called vanishing Norfolks, were the subject of a BBC TV film, All the King's Men. The division was evacuated from Gallipoli in early December and spent the most of 1916 in Cairo, Egypt, occupying No. 1 (Southern) Section of the Suez Canal defences.

The division (and the brigade) fought again in 1917 and invaded Palestine. The brigade fought in the First Battle of Gaza in late March, Second Battle of Gaza in mid-April and Third Battle of Gaza in late October – early November battles of Gaza and the Battle of Jaffa in December.

In 1918 the brigade fought at Berukin from April to May and finally at the Battle of Sharon in mid-September. The division concentrated at Beirut between 31 October and 5 November, but the Ottoman Empire surrendered on 31 October with the signing of the Armistice of Mudros.

==== Order of battle ====
- 1/4th Battalion, Norfolk Regiment
- 1/5th Battalion, Norfolk Regiment
- 1/4th Battalion, Suffolk Regiment (left November 1914)
- 1/5th Battalion, Suffolk Regiment
- 1/8th (Isle of Wight Rifles, Princess Beatrice's) Battalion, Hampshire Regiment (from 19 April 1915)
- 163rd Machine Gun Company, Machine Gun Corps (formed 1 May 1916, moved to 54th Battalion, Machine Gun Corps 19 April 1918)
- 163rd Trench Mortar Battery (formed 9 May 1917)

==== Commanders ====
The following officers commanded the brigade in the First World War:

- 9 October 1911: Brigadier-General R. Bayard
- 24 May 1915: Brigadier-General C. M. Brunker
- 19 August 1915: Brigadier-General F. F. W. Daniell (temporary)
- 19 August 1915: Lieutenant-Colonel E. Evans (acting)
- 10 September 1915: Brigadier-General T. Ward
- 24 April 1918: Lieutenant-Colonel O. M. Torkington (acting)
- 27 April 1918: Brigadier-General A. J. McNeill

=== Inter-war period ===
The brigade (and the division) was disbanded after the war, along with the rest of the Territorial Force. However, it was reformed, as the 163rd (Norfolk and Suffolk) Infantry Brigade, in the Territorial Army and continued to serve with the 54th (East Anglian) Division and had the same four battalions as it did before the First World War. However, in 1921, the 4th and 5th battalions of the Suffolks were amalgamated as the 4th/5th Battalion, Suffolk Regiment. The brigade later received the 1st Battalion, Cambridgeshire Regiment from the 162nd (East Midland) Infantry Brigade. The composition of the brigade remained this throughout much of the inter-war period.

In 1938, however, the 1st Battalion, Cambridgeshire Regiment was transferred back to 162nd (East Midland) Infantry Brigade, when all British infantry brigades were reduced to three battalions.

=== Second World War ===
In the Second World War, the brigade continued to be part of the 54th (East Anglian) Infantry Division from 3 September 1939 to 13 December 1943, when that division was disbanded. The brigade then became a Lines of Communication unit for the 21st Army Group. It stayed in the United Kingdom for the duration of its service. The original battalions of the brigade were converted into the 53rd Infantry Brigade, joining the 18th Infantry Division, on 18 September 1939 and the 163rd Infantry Brigade was reformed from the redesignation of the 161st Infantry Brigade.

Second World War commanders of the brigade included Brig. M.D. Jephson, Brig. R.A.D. Moseley, Brig. O.M. Wales, and Lieut.Col. A.L. Taffs.

==== Order of battle ====
- 5th Battalion, Royal Norfolk Regiment (until 17 September 1939)
- 6th Battalion, Royal Norfolk Regiment (until 17 September 1939)
- 7th Battalion, Royal Norfolk Regiment (until 17 September 1939)
- 2/4th Battalion, Essex Regiment (from 18 September 1939 to 11 April 1943)
- 5th (Hackney) Battalion, Royal Berkshire Regiment (from 18 September 1939 to 1 November 1943)
- 7th (Stoke Newington) Battalion, Royal Berkshire Regiment (from 18 September 1939 to 16 October 1942)
- 163rd Infantry Brigade Anti-Tank Company (formed 1 February 1940, disbanded 14 July 1941)
- 6th Battalion, King's Own Royal Regiment (Lancaster) (from 16 October to 11 December 1942)
- 1st Buckinghamshire Battalion, Oxfordshire and Buckinghamshire Light Infantry (from 12 December 1942 to 30 May 1943)
- 5th Battalion, King's Regiment (Liverpool) (from 18 July to 1 November 1943)
