= John Brown (British Army officer, born 1880) =

Lieutenant-General Sir John Brown KCB CBE DSO TD JP DL FRIBA FRICS
- Brown in 1934
- Born: 10 February 1880; Northampton, England
- Died: 4 April 1958 (aged 78); Northampton, England
- Military career
- Allegiance: United Kingdom
- Branch: British Army
- Service years: 1901–1941
- Rank: Lieutenant-General
- Commands: 162nd (East Midland) Brigade
- Conflicts: First World War; Second World War
- Awards: Knight Commander of the Order of the Bath; Commander of the Order of the British Empire; Distinguished Service Order; Territorial Decoration; Mentioned in Despatches

Lieutenant-General Sir John Brown, KCB, CBE, DSO, TD, JP, DL, FRIBA, FRICS (10 February 1880 – 4 April 1958) was a British architect and British Army officer. The first Territorial Army officer to reach the rank of major-general, he was described by Sir Basil Liddell Hart as "the foremost figure and most dynamic leader in the Territorial Army during years when its strength and efficiency were declining, and by his power of generating enthusiasm he created a local revival which had a far-reaching effect."

== Early life ==
John Brown was born in Northampton on 10 February 1880 to alderman and victualler John Brown and Kate Davis (née Allen). He attended Magdalen College School, Brackley, in Northamptonshire and joined the 1st Northamptonshire Rifle Volunteer Corps in 1901. He married Anna Maria Tonsley, the daughter of Northampton alderman Francis Tonsley, on 31 May 1904; they had two sons.

== Career ==
During the First World War, Brown went to the Dardanelles in 1915 and participated in the amphibious landing at Suvla Bay. He then served in the Palestine campaign, where he rose to command. He was awarded the Distinguished Service Order in 1918. After the war, Brown continued to serve in the Territorial Army until passed over for a divisional commander role in 1928. He was given command of the 162nd (East Midland) Brigade in 1924, which he was credited with making the best-known of the territorial formations. He was appointed a Commander of the Order of the British Empire (CBE) in 1923 and a Companion of the Order of the Bath (CB) in 1926.

Outside of his military service, Brown worked as an architect. He became an associate of the Royal Institute of British Architects in 1921, then later a fellow of the institute (FRIBA) in 1930. He was chairman of the Royal British Legion from 1930 to 1934, and was appointed a Knight Commander of the Order of the Bath in 1934 and made an honorary freeman of Northampton. In the late 1930s, he became a member of the national council of The Link, a pro-Nazi organization.

After Leslie Hore-Belisha became Secretary of State for War and began Royal Army reforms in 1937, Brown returned to serve as deputy director-general of the Territorial Army, thereby becoming the first Territorial Army officer to reach the rank of major-general. After the Second World War began in 1939, Brown was further promoted to lieutenant-general and served as deputy adjutant-general of the Territorial Army; in 1940 he became the deputy director-general of the Territorial Army and inspector-general, welfare and education, in the War Office. He retired in 1941.

After his war service, Brown was twice master (1942–1944 and 1950–1951) of the Worshipful Company of Pattenmakers.

Brown died at his home in Northampton 4 April 1958.

== Bibliography ==
- Griffiths, Richard (1980). Fellow Travellers of the Right: British Enthusiasts for Nazi Germany, 1933-9. London: Constable. ISBN 0571271324.
- https://nenequirer.com/2021/12/10/the-boy-from-the-garibaldi/
- Hart, B. H. L. (1971). "Brown, Sir John". Oxford Dictionary of National Biography (Archive ed.). doi:10.1093/odnb/9780192683120.013.32112.
- Hart, B. H. L.; Stearn, Roger T. (23 September 2004). "Brown, Sir John". Oxford Dictionary of National Biography. doi:10.1093/ref:odnb/32112.
- https://www.ukwhoswho.com/display/10.1093/ww/9780199540891.001.0001/ww-9780199540884-e-235175
- Nicholas Smart, Biographical Dictionary of British Generals of the Second World War
