= General Macready =

General Macready may refer to:

- Gordon Macready (1891–1956), British Army lieutenant general
- John Macready (British Army officer) (1887–27 February 1957), British Army brigadier general
- Nevil Macready (1862–1946), British Army general
