= 5th (Huntingdonshire) Battalion, Northamptonshire Regiment =

British military unit

Huntingdonshire Cyclist Battalion 5th (Huntingdonshire) Battalion, Northamptonshire Regiment
- Active: 27 February 1914 – 1 May 1961
- Country: United Kingdom
- Branch: British Army
- Type: Bicycle infantry Infantry
- Size: 1–3 battalions
- Part of: Eastern Command; 162nd (East Midland) Brigade; 143rd (Warwickshire) Infantry Brigade; 11th Infantry Brigade; 162nd Independent Infantry Brigade
- Garrison/HQ: Huntingdon (to 1919); Peterborough (from 1920)
- Service: First World War; Second World War Battle of France Tunisia Campaign Battle of Sicily Italian Campaign

Commanders
- Honorary Colonels: Col. The Rt. Hon. Edward Montagu, 8th Earl of Sandwich KCVO DSO; Lt.-Gen. Sir A.G. Hunter-Weston KCB DSO
- Notable commanders: William Edward Green

The Huntingdonshire Cyclist Battalion was a bicycle infantry battalion of the British Army. Formed in the Territorial Force in February 1914, it remained in the United Kingdom throughout the First World War. After the war, in 1920, it was converted to infantry and became the 5th (Huntingdonshire) Battalion, Northamptonshire Regiment, in the Territorial Army. The battalion saw extensive service in the Second World War, fighting in France in 1940, Tunisia from 1942–43 and later Sicily and Italy from 1943–45 before ending the war in May 1945 in Austria. It continued to serve after the Second World War until May 1961 when it was amalgamated with the 4th Battalion, Northamptonshire Regiment, to form the 4th/5th Battalion, Northamptonshire Regiment.

== History ==
=== Antecedents ===
From being close allies in the Crimean War (October 1853 – February 1856), Anglo-French relations had deteriorated to such an extent that by 1859 an invasion of Britain seemed a real possibility. An attempt to assassinate the French Emperor, Napoleon III, by Italian nationalists – the Orsini affair – had been linked to Britain as the bombs used in the attempt had been made and tested in England, coupled with the British Government's refusal to restrict the right of asylum. With the regular British Army stretched in the aftermath of the Indian Mutiny (May 1857 – June 1858), a popular movement saw the creation of the Volunteer Force. The first volunteer unit in Huntingdonshire was raised in Huntingdon in 1860 as the 1st Huntingdonshire Rifle Volunteer Corps. By June 1880, it had been reduced to J Company, 1st Cambridgeshire Rifle Volunteer Corps, at St Neots. J Company was disbanded in 1889.

On 4 December 1900, the 4th Volunteer Battalion, Bedfordshire Regiment, was raised with headquarters at Huntingdon and eight companies at Huntingdon, St Ives, Fletton, and St Neots. In April 1901, it was redesignated as the 4th (Huntingdonshire) Volunteer Battalion, Bedfordshire Regiment. It was later reduced to six companies.

The Volunteer Force was reorganised and combined with the Yeomanry to form the Territorial Force on 1 April 1908. As a result, the battalion was amalgamated with 3rd Volunteer Battalion, Bedfordshire Regiment, to form 5th Battalion, Bedfordshire Regiment. (Note: The 1st (Hertfordshire) and 2nd (Hertfordshire) Volunteer Battalions, Bedfordshire Regiment were amalgamated to form the Hertfordshire Regiment.) The new unit included just two companies from Huntingdonshire – G Company at Fletton (with a detachment at Yaxley) and H Company at Huntingdon (with detachments at St Ives and Ramsey).

=== Formation ===
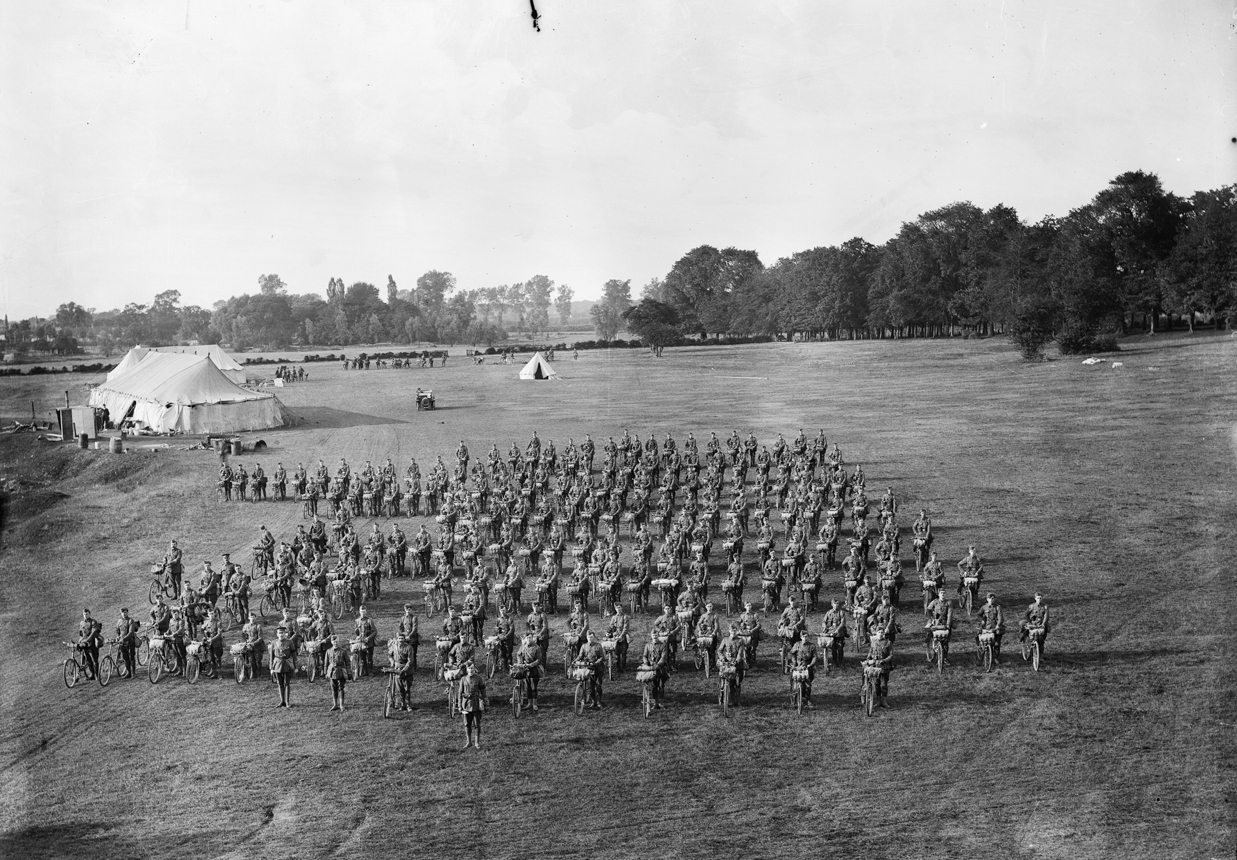
A bicycle company at Bury St Edmunds, Suffolk, c. 1910

With the formation of the Territorial Force, Huntingdonshire was one of the few counties that did not have its own battalion. After protracted negotiations with the War Office, agreement was reached in March 1913 that the Huntingdonshire Cyclist Battalion could be formed. The battalion was raised on 27 February 1914; (Note: The first commanding officer – Colonel E. Roland Herbert – was promoted and transferred from second in command of the 5th Battalion, Bedfordshire Regiment on 27 February 1914.) as such, it was the last battalion of the Territorial Force to be raised before the outbreak of the First World War. Once established, men of the two Huntingdonshire companies of the 5th Battalion, Bedfordshire Regiment, were allowed to transfer and almost all did so. Its headquarters were at St Mary's Street drill hall, Huntingdon, and it had the following companies:

- A Company – Huntingdon and Godmanchester
- B Company – Huntingdon and Godmanchester
- C Company – St Ives and Somersham
- D Company – St Neots and Kimbolton
- E Company – Ramsey and Warboys
- F Company – Fletton with detachments at Stanground and Peterborough (Note: Peterborough was not in Huntingdonshire but in the Soke of Peterborough.)
- G Company – Fletton with detachments at Stanground and Peterborough
- H Company – Yaxley and Farcet

The battalion was in Eastern Command, unattached to any higher formation. It was to be used as mobile infantry, and for work on signals, scouting and similar activities.

=== First World War ===
In accordance with the Territorial and Reserve Forces Act 1907 (7 Edw. 7, c.9) which brought the Territorial Force into being, the TF was intended to be a home defence force for service during wartime and members could not be compelled to serve outside the country. However, on the outbreak of war on 4 August 1914, many members volunteered for Imperial Service. Therefore, TF units were split in August and September 1914 into 1st Line (liable for overseas service) and 2nd Line (home service for those unable or unwilling to serve overseas) units. Later, 3rd Line units were formed to act as reserves, providing trained replacements for the 1st and 2nd Lines.

==== 1/1st Huntingdonshire Cyclist Battalion ====
The battalion was mobilised on 4 August 1914 at the outbreak of the First World War and moved to its war station at Grimsby. It remained in England throughout the war. In 1916 it was at Scarborough and in June 1918 it was at Whitby where it remained until the end of the war. The battalion was disembodied on 14 April 1919.

In late July 1916, the battalion provided a draft of over six hundred men for the 1/8th Battalion, Royal Warwickshire Regiment, on the Western Front.

==== 2/1st Huntingdonshire Cyclist Battalion ====
The 2nd Line battalion was formed in October 1914. It spent most of the war in Lincolnshire on coastal defence duties. In 1916 it was at Sutton-le-Marsh near Mablethorpe, in March 1917 at Alford and in July at Chapel St Leonards. In May 1918 it was at Skegness where it remained until the end of the war. The battalion was disbanded on 12 December 1919.

==== 3/1st Huntingdonshire Cyclist Battalion ====
The 3rd Line battalion was formed in 1915 to provide trained replacements for the 1st and 2nd Line battalions. It was disbanded in March 1916 and the men were posted to 1/1st and 2/1st Battalions and to the Machine Gun Corps.

=== Between the wars ===
The Territorial Force was disbanded after the First World War, although this was a formality and it was reformed in 1920. On 1 October 1921 it was renamed as the Territorial Army.

One major change with the new Territorial Army had an effect on the number of infantry battalions. The original 14 divisions were reformed with the pre-war standard of three brigades of four battalions each, for a total of 168 battalions. Infantry were no longer to be included as Army Troops or part of the Coastal Defence Forces so the pre-war total of 208 battalions had to be reduced by 40. This was achieved by either converting certain battalions to other roles, usually artillery or engineers, or by amalgamating pairs of battalions within a regiment. In particular, based on war time experience, the Army decided to dispense with cyclists units and the existing battalions were either disbanded or converted to artillery or signals units. However, the Huntingdonshire Battalion was converted to infantry and on 7 February 1920 was reconstituted as 5th (Huntingdonshire) Battalion, Northamptonshire Regiment, (Note: The battalion should not be confused with the 5th (Service) Battalion, Northamptonshire Regiment, which was a Kitchener's Army unit in the First World War. It was formed on 15 August 1914 at Northampton as part of First New Army – K1 – initially as an Army Troops battalion attached to the 12th (Eastern) Division. In January 1915, it became the Pioneer Battalion of the division and on 30 May crossed over to France. It remained the Pioneer Battalion of the 12th (Eastern) Division on the Western Front for the rest of the war. It was disbanded on 26 June 1919 at Aintree.) with headquarters at Peterborough. It joined the 4th Battalion, Northamptonshire Regiment, in the 162nd (East Midland) Infantry Brigade, which also included the 5th Battalion, Bedfordshire and Hertfordshire Regiment, and the 1st Battalion, Hertfordshire Regiment. The 162nd Brigade was part of the 54th (East Anglian) Infantry Division.

The increasing need to defend against attack from the air led to a number of Territorial Army units being converted to the anti-aircraft role in the 1930s and a major reorganisation in 1938 saw the TA divisions reduced from twelve to nine battalions. The combination of these factors led to the battalion being transferred, in 1938, to the 143rd (Warwickshire) Infantry Brigade, 48th (South Midland) Infantry Division, after the second of four battalions of the Royal Warwickshire Regiment had been converted to the anti-aircraft role. (Note: The 5th Battalion, Royal Warwickshire Regiment was transferred to the Royal Engineers and converted to 45th (Royal Warwickshire Regiment) Anti-Aircraft Battalion, Royal Engineers, in 1936 and the 6th Battalion, Royal Warwickshire Regiment, had been transferred to the Royal Artillery and converted to 69th (Royal Warwickshire Regiment) Anti-Aircraft Brigade, Royal Artillery, in 1938. The 7th and 8th Battalions, Royal Warwickshire Regiment, remained with 143rd Brigade.)

By 1939 it became clear that a new European war was likely to break out and, as a direct result of the German invasion of Czechoslovakia on 15 March, the doubling of the Territorial Army was authorised, with each unit and formation forming a duplicate. Consequently, the 5th (Huntingdonshire) Battalion formed the 4th Battalion, Northamptonshire Regiment. (Note: The 4th Battalion was not given the "Huntingdonshire" subtitle.)

=== Second World War ===
==== 5th (Huntingdonshire) Battalion, Northamptonshire Regiment ====
The 5th (Huntingdonshire) Battalion mobilised on 1 September 1939 with the 48th (South Midland) Infantry Division along with the rest of the Territorial Army when the German Army invaded Poland. Two days later, Britain and France declared war and the Second World War had begun. With the division, it joined the British Expeditionary Force (BEF) in France on 5 January 1940 – being the first Territorial Army division to do so – and joined I Corps. As part of the BEF's official policy to integrate Regular Army units into Territorial Army formations, on 29 January it transferred to 11th Infantry Brigade of the 4th Infantry Division, swapping places with the 1st Battalion, Oxfordshire and Buckinghamshire Light Infantry. The battalion remained with 11th Infantry Brigade for the rest of the war, serving alongside the 2nd Battalion, Lancashire Fusiliers, and the 1st Battalion, East Surrey Regiment, both Regular formations.

When the Germans invaded France and the Low Countries on 10 May 1940, the BEF moved forward to occupy pre-planned positions in Belgium (the Dyle Plan). The brigade took part in the Battle of the Ypres-Comines Canal (26 – 28 May) but the rapid German breakthrough into France forced the BEF into a withdrawal to Dunkirk. It was evacuated to England on 1 June 1940. It spent the next two years in the United Kingdom on anti-invasion duties preparing for a possible German invasion of the United Kingdom.

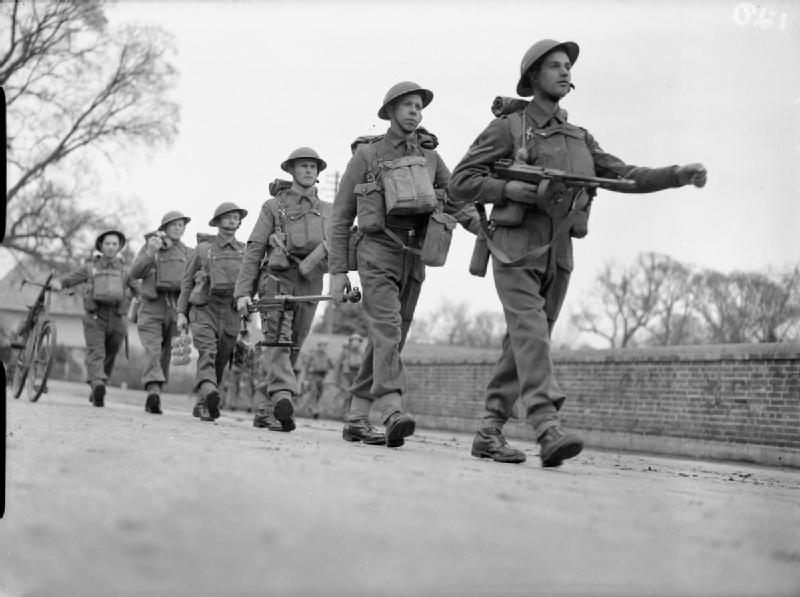
Men of the 5th (Huntingdonshire) Battalion, Northamptonshire Regiment, during an exercise near Christchurch, Dorset, 12 March 1941

In June 1942, 4th Infantry Division was reorganised as a Mixed Division (Note: A Mixed Division had one tank brigade with infantry tanks and two non-motorised infantry brigades, which was intended to improve tank/infantry cooperation. The experiment considered to be a failure and Mixed Divisions reverted to divisions of three infantry brigades in 1943.) when 21st Tank Brigade was assigned. On 5 June 1942, 11th Infantry Brigade left the division and came under command of First Army, before joining the 78th "Battleaxe" Infantry Division on 22 June. The 11th Brigade remained with the Battleaxe Division for the rest of the war.

The battalion left the United Kingdom on 16 October 1942 and deployed to French North Africa where it took part in Operation Torch, landing in Algeria on 9 November 1942. It took part in actions at the Tebourba Gap (1 – 10 December 1942), Oued Zarga (7 – 15 April 1943), the Medjez Plain (23 – 30 April), and the final battle for Tunis (5 – 12 May).

It next saw action as part of the Eighth Army in the Allied invasion of Sicily, landing on 25 July 1943. It took part in the Battle for Adrano (29 July – 3 August 1943). It left Sicily on 22 September for the Italian mainland and, other than a short period of rest in Egypt, served for the rest of the war on the Italian Front.

The battalion landed at Taranto and, with the division, advanced up the Adriatic coast under the command of V Corps. It took part in the crossing of The Sangro (19 November – 3 December 1943) under the command of V Corps. The division transferred to XIII Corps and took part in the First Battle of Monte Cassino (20 January – 20 March 1944), the Second Battle of Monte Cassino (11 – 18 May 1944), the advance up the Liri Valley (18 – 30 May) and the Battle for the Trasimene Line (20 – 30 June). (Note: Joslen states that 11th Infantry Brigade and 78th Infantry Division took part in the Advance to Florence (17 July – 10 August 1944) while also stating that the brigade and division were en route to (17 – 23 July) or in Egypt (23 July – 9 September) in the same period.)

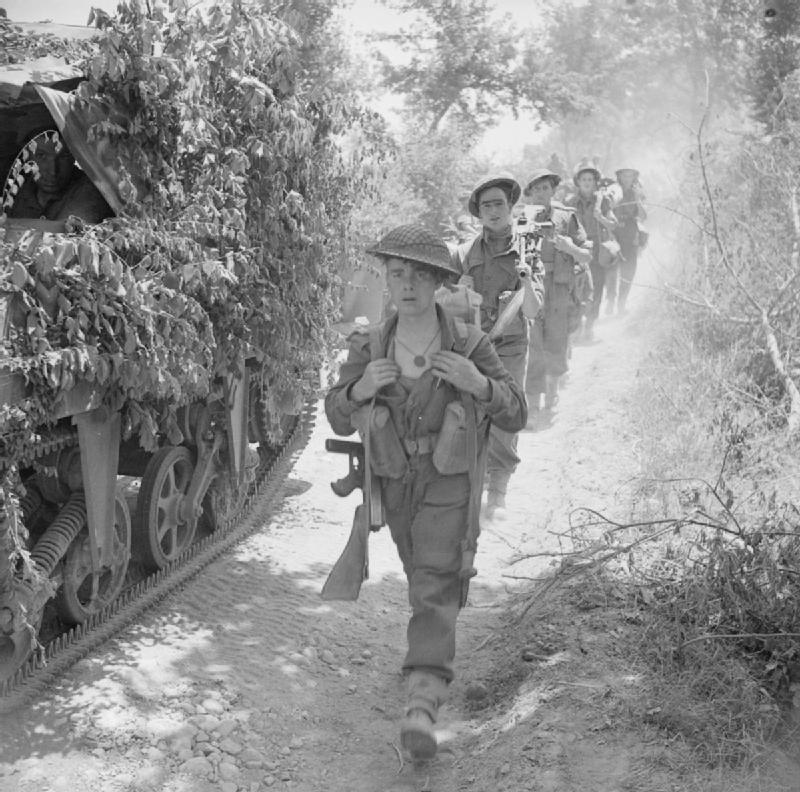
Men of the 5th (Huntingdonshire) Battalion, Northamptonshire Regiment, on the march near Coldragone, Italy, 25 May 1944

The battalion was transferred to Egypt on 17 July for rest and refitting, arriving back in Italy on 16 September. Again in V Corps, it took part in the final offensive in Italy (codenamed Operation Grapeshot) with the crossing of The Senio (9 – 12 April 1945) followed immediately by the Battle of the Argenta Gap (13 – 21 April).

The battalion entered Austria on 8 May 1945, following the surrender of German forces in Italy. It remained in Austria on occupation duties until it was placed in suspended animation (Note: "Suspended animation" means that the unit continues to exist but without any personnel or equipment assigned.) on 15 September 1946.

==== 4th Battalion, Northamptonshire Regiment ====
The original 4th Battalion, Northamptonshire Regiment had originated as the 1st Northamptonshire Rifle Volunteer Corps in 1860, had served in the Gallipoli and Sinai and Palestine Campaigns in the First World War and had been converted to a searchlight unit of the Royal Engineers in 1937 as the 50th (The Northamptonshire Regiment) Anti-Aircraft Battalion, Royal Engineers.

Formed on 1 June 1939 at Wellingborough, the new 4th Battalion was assigned on 6 November 1939 to the 183rd Infantry Brigade, serving alongside the 7th Battalion, Gloucestershire Regiment and the 10th Battalion, Worcestershire Regiment. The 183rd Brigade was part of the 61st Infantry Division (duplicate formation of the 48th (South Midland) Division). (Note: The 61st Infantry Division was not quite a mirror of the 48th (South Midland) Division: 48th (South Midland) Division, 1939 / 61st Infantry Division, 1939; 143rd Infantry Brigade; 1/7th Battalion, Royal Warwickshire Regiment; 8th Battalion, Royal Warwickshire Regiment; 5th (Huntingdonshire) Battalion, Northamptonshire Regiment / 182nd Infantry Brigade; 2/7th Battalion, Royal Warwickshire Regiment; 9th Battalion, Royal Warwickshire Regiment; 9th Battalion, Worcestershire Regiment; 144th Infantry Brigade; 5th Battalion, Gloucestershire Regiment; 7th Battalion, Worcestershire Regiment; 8th Battalion, Worcestershire Regiment / 183rd Infantry Brigade; 7th Battalion, Gloucestershire Regiment; 10th Battalion, Worcestershire Regiment; 4th Battalion, Northamptonshire Regiment; 145th Infantry Brigade; 4th Battalion, Oxfordshire and Buckinghamshire Light Infantry; 1st Buckinghamshire Battalion, OBLI; 4th Battalion, Royal Berkshire Regiment / 184th Infantry Brigade; 5th Battalion, Oxfordshire and Buckinghamshire Light Infantry; 2nd Buckinghamshire Battalion, OBLI; 6th Battalion, Royal Berkshire Regiment) It remained with the brigade in the United Kingdom for most of the war, including a considerable stint in Northern Ireland from June 1940 to February 1943.

On 28 August 1944, it transferred to 115th Infantry Brigade and remained with the brigade for the rest of the war. This formation was the core of Force 135 which was planning the liberation of the Channel Islands. In the event, the plan did not go ahead and the brigade left Force 135 on 30 January 1945. On 12 February, the battalion moved with the brigade to North West Europe where it remained until the end of the war serving variously under the direct command of VIII, XII and I Corps.

The 4th Battalion was placed in suspended animation in Germany on 4 February 1946. On 1 January 1947 it was amalgamated with the 5th (Huntingdonshire) Battalion.

=== Post war ===
The Territorial Army was disbanded at the end of the Second World War but, again, this was a formality. TA units were reactivated on 1 January 1947, though no personnel were assigned until commanding officers and permanent staff had been appointed in March and April 1947. The battalion was formally reconstituted on 1 January 1947 at Peterborough, absorbing its wartime duplicate 4th Battalion at the same time.

The battalion was assigned to the 162nd Independent Infantry Brigade along with the 5th Battalion, Bedfordshire and Hertfordshire Regiment and the 1st Battalion, Hertfordshire Regiment.

On 1 May 1961, the battalion amalgamated with R (The Northamptonshire Regiment) Battery, 438th Light Anti-Aircraft Regiment, Royal Artillery (the original 4th Battalion) to form 4th/5th Battalion, Northamptonshire Regiment.

== See also ==
- Army Cyclist Corps
- Arthur Mellows, a British army colonel and later Mayor of Peterborough who served with the Cyclist Battalion during the First World War

== Bibliography ==
- Beckett, Ian F.W. (2008). Territorials: A Century of Service. Plymouth: DRA Publishing. ISBN 978-0-9557813-1-5.
- Bellis, Malcolm A. (1994). Regiments of the British Army 1939–1945 (Armour & Infantry). London: Military Press International. ISBN 0-85420-999-9.
- Frederick, J.B.M. (1984). Lineage Book of British Land Forces 1660–1978. Wakefield, Yorkshire: Microform Academic Publishers. ISBN 1-85117-009-X.
- James, Brigadier E.A. (1978). British Regiments 1914–18. London: Samson Books Limited. ISBN 0-906304-03-2.
- Joslen, Lt-Col H.F. (1990) [1st. Pub. HMSO:1960]. Orders of Battle, Second World War, 1939–1945. London: London Stamp Exchange. ISBN 0-948130-03-2.
- Rinaldi, Richard A (2008). Order of Battle of the British Army 1914. Ravi Rikhye. ISBN 978-0-97760728-0.
- Westlake, Ray (1986). The Territorial Battalions, A Pictorial History, 1859–1985. Tunbridge Wells: Spellmount.
