= 162nd (East Midland) Brigade =

East Midland Brigade 162nd (East Midland) Brigade 162nd Infantry Brigade 162nd Independent Infantry Brigade
- Active: April 1908 – 30 September 1919; February 1920 – 31 August 1944; January 1947 – 1 May 1961
- Country: United Kingdom
- Branch: British Army
- Type: Infantry
- Size: Brigade
- Part of: 54th (East Anglian) Infantry Division
- Peacetime HQ: Bedford, Bedfordshire
- Engagements: First World War; Gallipoli Campaign; Landing at Suvla Bay; Sinai and Palestine Campaign; First Battle of Gaza; Second Battle of Gaza; Third Battle of Gaza; Battle of Jaffa (1917); Battle of Jerusalem; Second Transjordan attack on Shunet Nimrin and Es Salt (Berukin); Battle of Sharon; Second World War

The East Midland Brigade was an infantry brigade of the Territorial Force, part of the British Army, that was raised in 1908. As the name suggests, it commanded infantry battalions recruited in the East Midlands of England: Bedfordshire, Northamptonshire, Cambridgeshire and Hertfordshire. The brigade was an integral part of the East Anglian Division.

It was numbered as the 162nd (East Midland) Brigade (and the division as 54th (East Anglian) Division) and saw active service in the First World War at Gallipoli in 1915, Egypt in 1916 and in the Sinai and Palestine Campaign in 1917 and 1918.

Disbanded after the war, the brigade was reformed in the Territorial Army as the 162nd Infantry Brigade and continued to be part of the 54th (East Anglian) Infantry Division. In the Second World War, the brigade remained in the United Kingdom throughout the war and did not see service and was disbanded in August 1944.

The brigade was reformed in 1947 as 162nd Independent Infantry Brigade before being finally disbanded in 1961.

== History ==
=== Formation ===
The Territorial Force (TF) was formed on 1 April 1908 following the enactment of the Territorial and Reserve Forces Act 1907 (7 Edw.7, c.9) which combined and re-organised the old Volunteer Force, the Honourable Artillery Company and the Yeomanry. On formation, the TF contained 14 infantry divisions and 14 mounted yeomanry brigades. One of the divisions was the East Anglian Division and the East Midland Brigade formed one of its constituent brigades. (Note: The other brigades of the East Anglian Division were the Essex Brigade and the Norfolk and Suffolk Brigade.)

As the name suggests, the brigade recruited in the East Midlands of England and commanded four infantry battalions:

- 5th Battalion, Bedfordshire Regiment (Note: 5th Battalion, Bedfordshire Regiment was headquartered in Bedford and consisted of eight companies at Bedford, Luton (3), Biggleswade, Ampthill, Fletton and Huntingdon (their last two were in Huntingdonshire, not Bedfordshire).)
- 4th Battalion, Northamptonshire Regiment (Note: 4th Battalion, Northamptonshire Regiment was headquartered in Northampton and consisted of eight companies at Northampton (4), Wellingborough, Kettering, Desborough and Higham Ferrers.)
- 1st Battalion, Cambridgeshire Regiment (Note: 1st Battalion, Cambridgeshire Regiment was headquartered in Cambridge and consisted of eight companies at Cambridge (4), Wisbech, Whittlesea, March and Ely.)
- 1st Battalion, Hertfordshire Regiment (Note: 1st Battalion, Hertfordshire Regiment was headquartered in Hertford and consisted of eight companies at Hertford, St Albans, Bishop's Stortford, Watford, Royston, Hemel Hempstead, Hitchin and Waltham Cross.)

In peacetime, the brigade headquarters was in Bedford. The battalions were organized on an 8-company basis, but shortly after the outbreak of the First World War they were reorganized on the regular army standard of four companies in January 1915.

=== First World War ===
The brigade was on its annual fortnight's training camp when the First World War broke out on 4 August 1914. It immediately mobilized and concentrated at Bury St Edmunds; it was employed on coastal defence duties in East Anglia until May 1915.

In accordance with the Territorial and Reserve Forces Act 1907 (7 Edw.7, c.9) which brought the Territorial Force into being, the TF was intended to be a home defence force for service during wartime and members could not be compelled to serve outside the country. However, on the outbreak of war on 4 August 1914, many members volunteered for Imperial Service. Therefore, TF units were split into 1st Line (liable for overseas service) and 2nd Line (home service for those unable or unwilling to serve overseas) units. 2nd Line units performed the home defence role, although in fact most of these were also posted abroad in due course. The East Midland Brigade formed the 2nd East Midland Brigade in this manner with an identical structure.

Duplication in 1914
Original Battalions	East Midland Brigade	2nd East Midland Brigade
5th Battalion, Bedfordshire Regiment	1/5th Battalion, Bedfordshire Regiment	2/5th Battalion, Bedfordshire Regiment (Note: 2/5th Battalion, Bedfordshire Regiment was formed at Bedford in September 1914.)
4th Battalion, Northamptonshire Regiment	1/4th Battalion, Northamptonshire Regiment	2/4th Battalion, Northamptonshire Regiment (Note: 2/4th Battalion, Northamptonshire Regiment was formed at Northampton on 27 November 1914.)
1st Battalion, Cambridgeshire Regiment	1/1st Battalion, Cambridgeshire Regiment	2/1st Battalion, Cambridgeshire Regiment (Note: 2/1st Battalion, Cambridgeshire Regiment was formed at Cambridage in September 1914.)
1st Battalion, Hertfordshire Regiment	1/1st Battalion, Hertfordshire Regiment	2/1st Battalion, Hertfordshire Regiment (Note: 2/1st Battalion, Hertfordshire Regiment was formed at Hertford in September 1914.)

The 1/1st Battalion, Hertfordshire Regiment (Note: With the formation of the 2nd Line, the original units and formations were designated with the fractional "1/" and the 2nd Line with "2/".) left the brigade on 6 November 1914, landed at Le Havre and joined the 4th (Guards) Brigade in 2nd Division on the Western Front. It was to remain on the Western Front for the rest of the war. Likewise, the 1/1st Battalion, Cambridgeshire Regiment landed at Le Havre on 15 February 1915 and joined the 82nd Brigade in 27th Division. It also spent the rest of the war on the Western Front. They were replaced by the 10th (Hackney) and 11th (Finsbury Rifles) battalions of the London Regiment, transferred from 3rd London Brigade, 1st London Division in April 1915.

==== Gallipoli ====
In May 1915, the brigade concentrated with its division in the St Albans area to prepare for overseas service. In mid-May, the East Anglian Division was numbered as 54th (East Anglian) Division and the brigade became 162nd (East Midland) Brigade. On 8 July it was warned for service at Gallipoli and between 28 and 30 July it departed Devonport (Beds and Northants battalions) and Liverpool (London battalions) for the Mediterranean. On the night of 10/11 August 1915 the brigade landed at Suvla with its division as part of IX Corps.

The brigade's first attack was against Kiretch Tepe Ridge and Kidney Hill in support of the 10th (Irish) Division on 15 August which cost a high price: the 1/5th Bedfords suffered casualties of 14 officers and 300 other ranks, the 1/10th Londons 6 and 260 and the 1/11th Londons 9 and 350 (the 1/4th Northants had not yet landed). After the failure of the Battle of Scimitar Hill (21 August), the Suvla front subsided into trench warfare. The brigade spent September, October and November serving turns in frontline trenches with names like Finsbury Vale and New Bedford Road, battalions normally spending about a week at a time in the frontline with the enemy lines being as little as 15–50 yards away. Sniping and artillery attacks were a constant problem, as was the heat, flies, and lack of sanitation.

The brigade was withdrawn from Suvla in early December, departing for Mudros and from there to Egypt.

==== Sinai and Palestine ====
The brigade arrived at Mena Camp, Cairo on 19 December 1915. It would spend the rest of the war in Egypt, Palestine and Syria.

On 2 April 1916, the brigade joined No. 1 (Southern) Section of the Suez Canal Defences.

In 1917, the brigade took part in the invasion of Palestine. It fought in the First Battle of Gaza (26 and 27 March), the Second Battle of Gaza (17–19 April) under Eastern Force, and the Third Battle of Gaza (27 October – 7 November), the Capture of Gaza (1–7 November) and the Battle of Jaffa (21 and 22 December) as part of XXI Corps.

Still with XXI Corps, in 1918 the brigade took part in the Fight at Ras el'Ain (12 March) and Berukin (9 and 10 April). It then took part in the Final Offensive in Palestine in the Battle of Sharon (19–23 September). The brigade reached Haifa by 4 October, and advanced on Beirut via Acre, Tyre and Sidon concentrating at Beirut by 5 November. However, the Armistice of Mudros had ended the war with the Ottoman Empire on 31 October.

The division and brigade were withdrawn to Egypt in late November and December, concentrating at Helmie by 7 December. On 6 January 1919, the 162nd Brigade Trench Mortar Battery was disbanded marking the start of the demobilization process. By 30 September 1919 the division had disappeared in Egypt.

==== Order of battle ====
The brigade commanded the following units:

- 1/5th Battalion, Bedfordshire Regiment
- 1/4th Battalion, Northamptonshire Regiment
- 1/1st Battalion, Cambridgeshire Regiment (left February 1915)
- 1/1st Battalion, Hertfordshire Regiment (left November 1914)
- 2/1st Battalion, Cambridgeshire Regiment (joined February 1915, left April 1915)
- 1/10th (Hackney) Battalion, London Regiment (joined April 1915)
- 1/11th (Finsbury Rifles) Battalion, London Regiment (joined April 1915)
- 162nd Machine Gun Company (formed 26 April 1916, joined 54th Battalion, Machine Gun Corps on 19 April 1918)
- 162nd Trench Mortar Battery (formed 5 May 1917)

==== Commanders ====
The brigade had the following commanders:

From	To	Name	Notes
21 August 1911	15 August 1915	Colonel Charles de Winton	promoted Brigadier-General on 5 August 1914
15 August 1915	20 August 1915	Lieutenant-Colonel P.C. Byrne	acting
20 August 1915	25 May 1917	Brigadier-General A. Mudge	sick 25 May 1917
25 May 1917	23 June 1917	Lieutenant-Colonel E.W. Brighten	acting
23 June 1917	12 June 1918	Brigadier-General A. Mudge	leave 12 June 1917
12 June 1918	20 June 1918	Lieutenant-Colonel J.F.S. Winnington	acting
20 June 1918	25 August 1918	Lieutenant-Colonel E.W. Brighten	acting
25 August 1918	demobilization	Brigadier-General A. Mudge	

=== Inter-war period ===
The Territorial Force was effectively disbanded in 1919, but started to reform from 1 February 1920 as the units commenced recruiting. From 1 October 1921, it was renamed as the Territorial Army (TA). In 1920, the 54th (East Anglian) Infantry Division (and the brigade) began to reform in Eastern Command with the same structure as the pre-war formation, and the brigade was reconstituted as 162nd (East Midland) Infantry Brigade. However, in the early 1920s, the 1st Battalion, Cambridgeshire Regiment was transferred to 163rd (Norfolk and Suffolk) Infantry Brigade and replaced by the 5th (Huntingdonshire) Battalion, Northamptonshire Regiment, previously the Huntingdonshire Cyclist Battalion of the Army Cyclist Corps

In 1938, a major reorganization of the Territorial Army saw infantry divisions reduced from twelve to nine battalions and so the 162nd Brigade was reduced from four to three battalions. Consequently, the 4th Northants were transferred to the Royal Engineers and converted as 50th (The Northamptonshire Regiment) Anti-Aircraft Battalion, Royal Engineers with a searchlight role and became part of 32nd (South Midland) Anti-Aircraft Group, 2nd Anti-Aircraft Division. The 5th Northants were transferred to the 143rd (Warwickshire) Infantry Brigade of the 48th (South Midland) Infantry Division in 1938 and received the 1st Cambridgeshires as a replacement (which had transferred to 163rd (Norfolk and Suffolk) Infantry Brigade in the 1920s).

By 1939, it became clear that a new European war was likely to break out, and as a direct result of the German invasion of Czechoslovakia on 15 March, the doubling of the Territorial Army was authorised, with each unit and formation forming a duplicate. The 162nd Brigade formed the 55th Infantry Brigade which became part of a new 18th Infantry Division.

Duplication in 1939
Original Battalions	162nd Brigade	55th Brigade
5th Battalion, Bedfordshire and Hertfordshire Regiment (Note: The Bedfordshire Regiment was renamed as the Bedfordshire and Hertfordshire Regiment on 29 July 1919.)	6th Battalion, Bedfordshire and Hertfordshire Regiment	5th Battalion, Bedfordshire and Hertfordshire Regiment
1st Battalion, Cambridgeshire Regiment	1st Battalion, Hertfordshire Regiment	1st Battalion, Cambridgeshire Regiment
1st Battalion, Hertfordshire Regiment	2nd Battalion, Hertfordshire Regiment	2nd Battalion, Cambridgeshire Regiment

=== Second World War ===
At the outbreak of Second World War on 3 September 1939, the 162nd Infantry Brigade was part of 54th (East Anglian) Infantry Division in Eastern Command. Apart from a period (5 December 1942 – 15 August 1943) when it served under London District, as 162nd Independent Infantry Brigade from 10 November 1942 to 5 September 1943, the brigade remained with the 54th Division until the division was disbanded in December 1943. Thereafter, the brigade formed part of the Line of communication (LoC) for 21st Army Group, the last two months of its existence under 12th LoC Area.

The brigade headquarters disbanded on 31 August 1944, having never left the United Kingdom.

==== Order of Battle ====
The brigade commanded the following units:

- 6th Battalion, Bedfordshire and Hertfordshire Regiment (left 20 August 1944, placed in suspended animation.)
- 1st Battalion, Hertfordshire Regiment (left 7 September 1942)
- 2nd Battalion, Hertfordshire Regiment (left 17 September 1942)
- 162nd Infantry Brigade Anti-Tank Company (from 1 February 1940 to 14 July 1941)
- 70th (Young Soldiers) Battalion, Sherwood Foresters (from 8 to 27 September 1942 when renumbered as 16th Battalion, Sherwood Foresters, left 5 December 1942)
- 7th Battalion, East Yorkshire Regiment (from 22 September 1942 to 6 July 1944)
- 1st Battalion, Leicestershire Regiment (from 8 December 1942 to 2 July 1944)

==== Commanders ====
The brigade had the following commanders:

From	To	Name
3 September 1939	27 August 1940	Brigadier J. Macready
27 August 1940	14 October 1941	Brigadier R.B.S. Reford
14 October 1941	31 August 1944	Brigadier T.G. Newbury

=== Post war ===
The Territorial Army was formally disbanded at the end of the war. TA units were reactivated on 1 January 1947, though no personnel were assigned until commanding officers and permanent staff had been appointed in March and April 1947. The brigade was reformed in 1947 as the 162nd Independent Infantry Brigade and commanded:

- 5th Battalion, Bedfordshire and Hertfordshire Regiment
- 1st Battalion, Hertfordshire Regiment
- 5th (Huntingdonshire) Battalion, Northamptonshire Regiment
- 162nd Brigade Signals, Royal Corps of Signals
- 162nd Brigade, Royal Army Service Corps
- 162nd Brigade Workshop

On 1 May 1961, the ten existing TA divisions were merged with the districts, and the number of infantry brigades were reduced from 31 to 23. On 1 April 1961, the 5th Battalion, Bedfordshire and Hertfordshire Regiment was amalgamated with the 1st Battalion, Hertfordshire Regiment to form the 1st Battalion, Bedfordshire and Hertfordshire Regiment. (Note: The original regular army 1st Battalion, Bedfordshire and Hertfordshire Regiment had been amalgamated with the Essex Regiment on 2 June 1958 as the 3rd East Anglian Regiment (16th/44th Foot).) On 1 May 1961, the 5th (Huntingdonshire) Battalion, Northamptonshire Regiment amalgamated with R (The Northamptonshire Regiment) Battery, 438th Light Anti-Aircraft Regiment RA (formerly 4th Battalion, Northamptonshire Regiment) to form 4th/5th Battalion, Northamptonshire Regiment.

== Victoria Cross ==
The Victoria Cross is the highest and most prestigious award for gallantry in the face of the enemy that can be awarded to British and Commonwealth forces. Two soldiers won the award while serving with the brigade:

- Lance-corporal John Alexander Christie of 1/11th (Finsbury Rifles) Battalion, London Regiment on 21/22 December 1917 at Fejja, Palestine
- Private Samuel Needham of 1/5th Battalion, Bedfordshire Regiment on 10/11 September 1918 at Kefr Kasim, Palestine

== See also ==
- 207th (2nd East Midland) Brigade for the 2nd Line formation in the First World War
- 55th Infantry Brigade (United Kingdom) for the duplicate formation in the Second World War
- List of First World War Victoria Cross recipients

== Bibliography ==
- Becke, Archibald F. (1936). Order of Battle of Divisions Part 2A. The Territorial Force Mounted Divisions and the 1st-Line Territorial Force Divisions (42–56). London: HMSO. OCLC 4405016.
- Becke, Archibald F. (1937). Order of Battle of Divisions Part 2B. The 2nd-Line Territorial Force Divisions (57th–69th) with The Home-Service Divisions (71st–73rd) and 74th and 75th Divisions. London: HMSO. OCLC 4405016.
- Beckett, Ian F.W. (2008). Territorials: A Century of Service. Plymouth: DRA Publishing. ISBN 978-0-9557813-1-5.
- Bellis, Malcolm A. (1994). Regiments of the British Army 1939–1945 (Armour & Infantry). London: Military Press International. ISBN 0-85420-999-9.
- Bellis, Malcolm A. (1995). Regiments of the British Army 1939–1945 (Artillery). London: Military Press International. ISBN 0-85420-110-6.
- James, E.A. (1978). British Regiments 1914–18. London: Samson Books Limited. ISBN 0-906304-03-2.
- Joslen, H. F. (2003) [1960]. Orders of Battle: Second World War, 1939–1945. Uckfield, East Sussex: Naval and Military Press. ISBN 978-1-84342-474-1.
- Rinaldi, Richard A (2008). Order of Battle of the British Army 1914. Ravi Rikhye. ISBN 978-0-9776072-8-0.
- Westlake, Ray (1986). The Territorial Battalions, A Pictorial History, 1859–1985. Tunbridge Wells: Spellmount.
- Westlake, Ray (1992). British Territorial Units 1914–18. Vol. 245 of Men-at-Arms Series. Osprey Publishing. ISBN 978-1-85532-168-7.
- Westlake, Ray (1996). British Regiments at Gallipoli. Barnsley: Leo Cooper. ISBN 0-85052-511-X.
