= 143rd Infantry Brigade (United Kingdom) =

Warwickshire Brigade 143rd (Warwickshire) Brigade 143rd Infantry Brigade 143rd Infantry (Reserve) Brigade 143rd (West Midlands) Brigade
- Insignia of the 143rd Brigade
- Active: 1908–1919; 1920–1946; 1984–2014
- Country: United Kingdom
- Branch: British Army
- Type: Territorial Army; Regular Army
- Size: Brigade
- Part of: 48th (South Midland) Infantry Division; Support Command
- Garrison/HQ: Copthorne Barracks, Shrewsbury
- Engagements: First World War; Second World War

The 143rd Infantry Brigade was an infantry brigade of the British Army that saw active service in both the First and the Second World Wars. In the First World War the brigade served on both Western Front and later the Italian Front. During the Second World War the brigade fought in Belgium and France before being evacuated to England where it remained for the rest of the war and was finally disbanded in 1946. Raised again in the 1980s, this brigade disbanded under Army 2020 in November 2014.

== Formation ==
The Warwickshire Brigade, as this brigade was originally known, was first raised in April 1908 under the Haldane Reforms when the Territorial Force was created, which was formed by the amalgamation of the Yeomanry and Volunteer Force. The brigade was assigned to the South Midland Division, one of fourteen divisions of the peacetime Territorials. The Warwickshire Brigade was composed of the 5th, 6th, 7th and 8th Volunteer battalions of the Royal Warwickshire Regiment.

== First World War ==
The brigade and division were mobilised on 5 August 1914, a day after the British declaration of war on Germany, thus beginning the First World War. When asked to serve overseas (as soldiers in the TF were not obliged to serve overseas), most of the men of the brigade volunteered for Imperial Service and those who did not were left to be formed into 2nd Line battalions and brigades, forming the 2nd Warwickshire Brigade (2/5th-2/8th Royal Warwickshires) of the 2nd South Midland Division, later the 182nd (2/1st Warwickshire) Brigade, 61st (2nd South Midland) Division. The 1st Line battalions adopted the '1/' prefix (1/5th-1/8th Royal Warwickshires) to distinguish them from the 2nd Line, which adopted the '2/'.

The South Midland Division spent many months in England training until 13 March 1915 when it was warned to prepare for overseas service to reinforce the British Expeditionary Force (BEF) on the Western Front which had suffered heavy casualties in the winter of 1914-15.

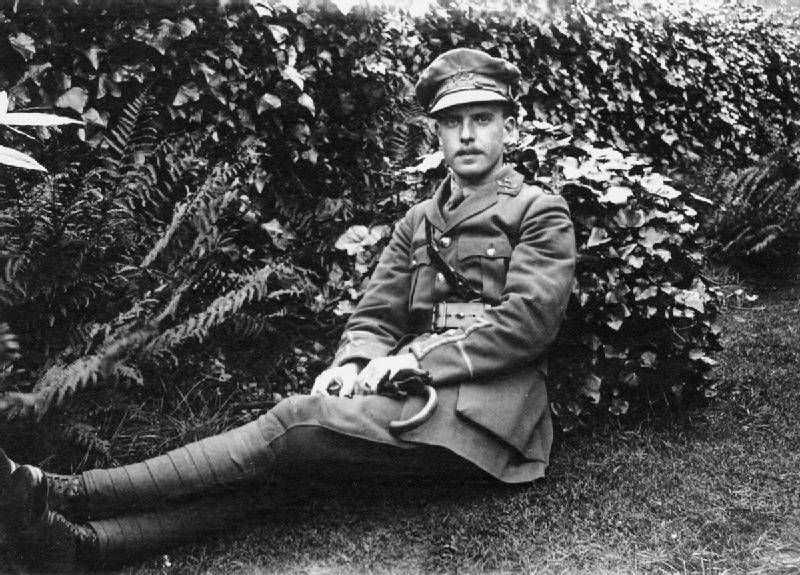
Second Lieutenant Frederick Wigan Jones of the 1/8th Battalion, Royal Warwickshire Regiment. Jones received his commission in November 1915 and was promoted to lieutenant in October 1916. He was seriously wounded in November 1916 whilst assisting a soldier who had lost his unit. He died from his wounds, aged 24, on 28 December 1916. He is buried at Yardley Cemetery, Birmingham.

On 13 May 1915 the division was numbered, becoming the 48th (South Midland) Division and the brigades in the division were also numbered, the 1st Warwickshire Brigade became the 143rd (Warwickshire) Brigade. The brigade served throughout the Great War on the Western Front in battles at the Somme and Passchendaele. In early November 1917 the 143rd Brigade, with the rest of 48th (South Midland) Division, was sent to the Italian Front and fought at Piave River in June 1918 and later at Vittoria Veneto, which ended the war in Italy with the signing of the Armistice of Villa Giusti. Both the brigade and division ended the war in Italy.

=== Order of battle ===
- 1/5th Battalion, Royal Warwickshire Regiment
- 1/6th Battalion, Royal Warwickshire Regiment
- 1/7th Battalion, Royal Warwickshire Regiment
- 1/8th Battalion, Royal Warwickshire Regiment (until September 1918)
- 143rd Machine Gun Company, Machine Gun Corps (formed 8 January 1916, moved to 48th Battalion, Machine Gun Corps 22 March 1918)
- 143rd Trench Mortar Battery (formed 14 June 1916)

== Interwar ==
The brigade and division were both disbanded in 1919 and then again reformed in 1920 as part of the Territorial Army as the 143rd (Warwickshire) Infantry Brigade and continued to serve with the 48th Division. The brigade again consisted of four battalions of the Royal Warwickshire Regiment and remained this way for most of the inter-war years.

However, in the late 1930s, there was an increasing need to strengthen the anti-aircraft defences for the cities of the United Kingdom and, as a result, many infantry battalions of the Territorial Army were subsequently converted into anti-aircraft or searchlight units. In 1936 the 5th Battalion, Royal Warwickshires was one of many selected and transferred to the Royal Engineers, becoming 45th (The Royal Warwickshire Regiment) Anti-Aircraft Battalion, Royal Engineers, transferring to 32nd (South Midland) Anti-Aircraft Group, itself part of 2nd Anti-Aircraft Division. They were replaced by the 5th (Huntingdonshire) Battalion, Northamptonshire Regiment, originally from the 162nd (East Midland) Infantry Brigade, 54th (East Anglian) Infantry Division. This battalion was previously the Huntingdonshire Cyclist Battalion of the Army Cyclist Corps.

In 1938 all infantry brigades of the British Army were reduced from four battalions to three and so the 6th Battalion, Royal Warwickshire Regiment was transferred to the Royal Artillery and converted to an anti-aircraft regiment, becoming 69th (Royal Warwickshire Regiment) Anti-Aircraft Brigade, Royal Artillery, joining the 45th AA Battalion, RE (formerly the 5th Royal Warwickshires) in the 32nd (Midland) Anti-Aircraft Group, 2nd Anti-Aircraft Division. In the following year the brigade was redesignated 143rd Infantry Brigade.

== Second World War ==
The 48th (South Midland) Infantry Division was mobilised on 1 September 1939, along with the rest of the Territorial Army, when the German Army launched its invasion of Poland. The Second World War began two days later, on 3 September 1939, with Britain and France declaring war on Germany. The men of the brigade were called up for full-time war service and, with the division, began training in preparation for an eventual move overseas.

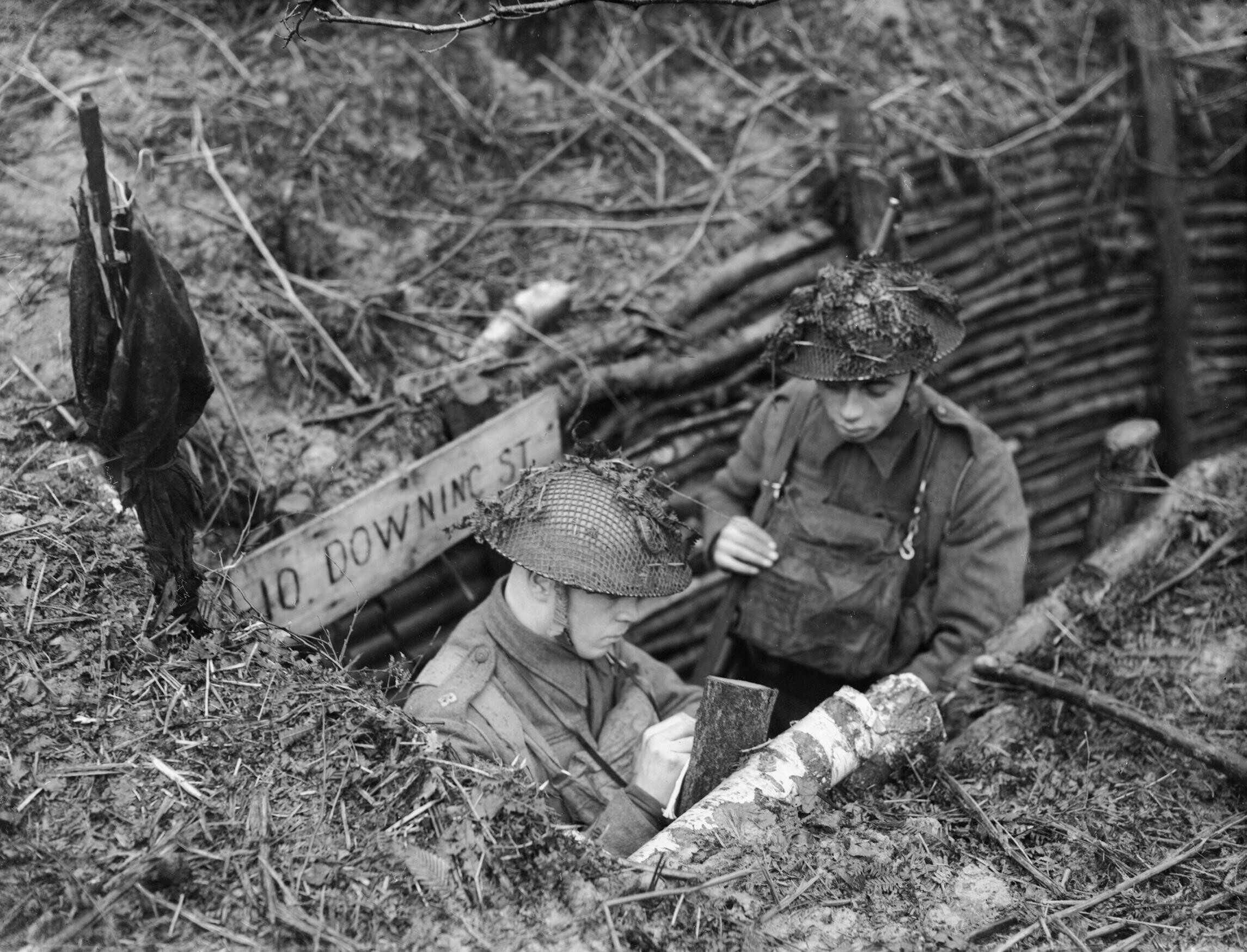
Men of 14 Platoon, 'C' Company, 1/7th Battalion, Royal Warwickshire Regiment in a forward trench named '10 Downing Street' in Flines Woods near Orchies, France, 8 February 1940.

The 143rd Infantry Brigade, commanded at the time by Acting Brigadier James Muirhead, a Regular Army officer, with the rest of the 48th Division was sent to France in early 1940. The brigade arrived in France on 12 January, where it became part of the British Expeditionary Force (BEF), which was stationed alongside the French Army on the Franco-Belgian border. The 48th Division, commanded by Major-General Andrew Thorne, was the first complete division of the Territorial Army to be sent overseas during the Second World War. The division came under command of I Corps, commanded by Lieutenant-General Michael Barker, serving alongside the 1st and 2nd Infantry Divisions, both Regular Army formations. Due to a policy within the BEF of integrating the Regular Army with the Territorials, the 5th (Huntingdonshire) Battalion, Northamptonshire Regiment was sent to 11th Brigade of the 4th Division and exchanged for the 1st Battalion, Oxfordshire and Buckinghamshire Light Infantry, a Regular Army unit.

With the rest of the division, the 143rd Brigade fought in the battles of Belgium and France in May–June 1940 against the German Army but was forced to retreat to Dunkirk, where the 143rd Brigade in particular fought in the battle of the Ypres-Comines Canal. With the rest of the BEF, most of the brigade and division were evacuated to England after the Germans threatened to cut off the BEF from the main French Armies which would likely have caused the annihilation of the BEF.

The brigade and division were successfully evacuated, yet had suffered extremely heavy casualties (8th Royal Warwicks had been reduced to 8 officers and 134 ORs) and had to be completely reformed and brought up to strength with conscripts. Until late 1941 the division was on home defence, training in preparation for a possible German invasion of England. The invasion, fortunately, never arrived due to events that occurred during the Battle of Britain as German intentions turned to the invasion of the Soviet Union.

On 20 December 1942, the division was reduced to a Lower Establishment and the division, now the 48th Infantry (Reserve) Division, became a reserve training formation in the United Kingdom and the brigade was redesignated 143rd Infantry (Reserve) Brigade. The brigade remained in this role for the rest of the war, supplying drafts of replacements for the divisions fighting overseas. The brigade and division were both disbanded after the war in 1946 when it was finally disbanded.

=== Order of battle ===
The 143rd Infantry Brigade was constituted as follows during the war:

- 1/7th Battalion, Royal Warwickshire Regiment (left 3 October 1942)
- 1/8th Battalion, Royal Warwickshire Regiment (left 13 July 1944)
- 5th Battalion, Northamptonshire Regiment (left 29 January 1940)
- 143rd Infantry Brigade Anti-Tank Company (formed 6 October 1939, disbanded 29 January 1940)
- 1st Battalion, Oxfordshire and Buckinghamshire Light Infantry (from 29 January 1940, left 9 November 1941)
- 10th Battalion, Somerset Light Infantry (from 16 November 1941, left 3 June 1942, later became 7th Battalion, Parachute Regiment)
- 8th Battalion, Suffolk Regiment (from 4 September 1942, left 26 July 1944)
- 11th Battalion, Green Howards (from 13 September 1942)
- 5th Battalion, West Yorkshire Regiment (from 26 July, left 23 August 1944)
- 10th Battalion, Duke of Wellington's Regiment (from 26 July 1944)
- 11th Battalion, York and Lancaster Regiment (from 1 August 1944)
- 1st Battalion, Sherwood Foresters (from 23 July, left 2 August 1944)
- 11th Battalion, West Yorkshire Regiment (from 24 August 1944)

=== Commanders ===
The following officers commanded 143rd Infantry Brigade during the war:

- Brigadier J. Muirhead (until 7 June 1940)
- Lieutenant-Colonel (Acting, from 7 to 19 June 1940)
- Brigadier J. Muirhead (from 19 June 1940 until 14 November 1941)
- Lieutenant-Colonel D.B. Bird (Acting, from 14 November until 27 December 1941)
- Brigadier C.D. Marley (from 27 December 1941 until 19 August 1944)
- Brigadier W. Carden Roe (from 19 August 1944)

== Post War ==
The brigade was disbanded after the Second World War and not reformed in the Territorial Army in 1947. The brigade was re-raised in 1984, moving to Shrewsbury in 1986.

In 1991, it took on responsibility for the Army in Shropshire, Staffordshire, Hereford and Worcester, Warwickshire and the West Midlands. With the disbandment of 5th Division, 143 (West Midlands) Brigade came under the control of the new Support Command based in Aldershot, in April 2012. 11 Signal Brigade and 143 (West Midlands) Brigade amalgamated to form 11th Signal Brigade and Headquarters West Midlands in November 2014. A few remaining elements of the former brigade moved to MoD Donnington in 2015.

== Victoria Cross recipients ==
- Private Arthur Hutt, 1/7th Battalion, Royal Warwickshire Regiment, Great War

== Bibliography ==
- Joslen, H. F. (2003) [1960]. Orders of Battle: Second World War, 1939–1945. Uckfield, East Sussex: Naval and Military Press. ISBN 978-1-84342-474-1.
- David Fraser (1999) [1983]. And We Shall Shock Them: The British Army in the Second World War. Cassell military. ISBN 978-0-304-35233-3.
