= John Macready =

John Macready may refer to:

- John Macready (gymnast)
- John A. Macready, American test pilot and aviator
- John Macready (British Army officer)
