= Rowena Farre =

British writer (1921–1979)

Rowena Farre (26 February 1921 – 9 January 1979) was a British writer who achieved fame for her first book Seal Morning, published in 1957. Seal Morning describes how, at the age of ten, the writer and her aunt Miriam settled in a remote croft in Sutherland, Scotland, where they lived for seven years with various pets that included a common seal, Lora. The book has been reprinted a number of times and translated into seven languages. Seal Morning was made into a UK television series in 1986, though with considerable alterations and the setting relocated to Norfolk.

== Life and works ==
According to the publisher’s blurb, Farre’s early childhood was spent in India, the country she looked on as a second home. Because her parents thought it better for her health, she was sent to Britain and left in charge with an aunt - the Aunt Miriam of the book. They lived in Buckinghamshire and Kent before going to Sutherland, and except for a brief period in a kindergarten, all her education was undertaken by her aunt. When her aunt married and moved abroad, the author trained as a typist and took a job in an office but tried to find work outdoors during the summer months. She had travelled extensively in Britain and had lived among Irish Travellers and Romani people.

Although the book became a best-seller, questions were raised concerning the authenticity of parts of the narrative, including the claimed musical abilities of seals. The Northern Times made extensive enquiries but was unable to locate the croft in which she claimed to have lived. Other journalists were also unable to substantiate the claim.

Seal Morning was republished by Edinburgh’s Mercat Press in 2001. Former Scots Magazine editor Maurice Fleming says that, in spite of the enduring charm and freshness of Farre’s book, "a rather large question mark hangs over the credibility of the narrative." The book is now considered an autobiographical novel rather than a strict autobiography.

Seal Morning was followed by A Time from the World (1962), an account of her life among Romani people. In the United States, this was published under the title Gypsy Idyll. She also wrote The Beckoning Land (1969), describing her spiritual pilgrimage in Ceylon and India. Neither book achieved the popularity of Seal Morning.

== Identity of Rowena Farre ==
A deeply private and elusive writer, Farre disappeared from her lodgings just before the publication of Seal Morning. As the popularity of Seal Morning grew, her publisher, Hutchinson, had to go to considerable efforts to trace her. Mark Andresen states that her real name was Lois Parr. However, it was subsequently discovered that the writer's real name was Daphne Lois Macready.

There has been disagreement over her place of birth. According to newspaper reports and her literary executor Curtis Brown, she was born in India, where she spent the early years of her life. The Scots Magazine describes Farre as the India-born daughter of a British Army medical officer. "... she had a brother, but the only "family" she seemed proud or happy to acknowledge was her great-grandfather, the celebrated actor-manager W.C. Macready." Some sources give her date of birth as 1930.

However, from research of his family history, Dr Bernerd O’Neil states that she was born in London in 1921, died in Canterbury on 9 January 1979. Her cremated remains are deposited adjacent to the coffin of William Charles Macready in the catacomb below the Anglican Chapel at Kensal Green Cemetery in London.

This is confirmed by family trees published on Ancestry.com and elsewhere which show Daphne Lois Macready as the daughter of Brig. Gen. John Macready (1887-1957) and Marguerite Mary Milling (1890-1982). The couple also had a son, Anthony John Lowne Macready. Brig. Gen. John Macready was a grandson of William Charles Macready and served in India in the Bedfordshire and Hertfordshire Regiment.

Macready, who was estranged from her family, served as a WAAF officer in World War II. As well as travelling in the Far East, she is known to have visited Australia.
