= Clare Street drill hall, Northampton =

Military installation in Northamptonshire, England

Clare Street drill hall
- Northampton
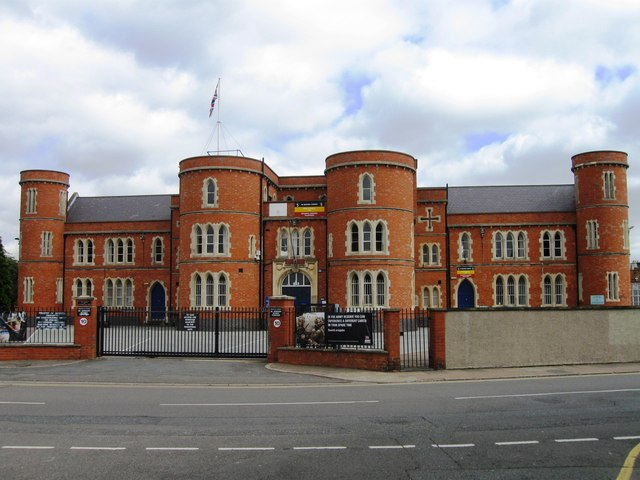
- Clare Street drill hall

Site information
- Type: Drill hall

Location
- Location within Northamptonshire
- Coordinates: 52.24372°N 0.89001°W

Site history
- Built: 1859
- Built for: War Office
- In use: 1859-Present

The Clare Street drill hall is a military installation in Northampton, Northamptonshire. It is a Grade II listed building.

== History ==
The building was designed in the Fortress Gothic Revival Style as the headquarters of the 1st Northamptonshire Rifle Volunteer Corps and completed in 1859. The unit evolved to become the 1st Volunteer Battalion, The Northamptonshire Regiment in 1887 and the 4th Battalion, The Northamptonshire Regiment in 1908. The battalion was mobilised at the drill hall in August 1914 before being deployed to Gallipoli and, ultimately, to Palestine. The Northamptonshire Yeomanry was also based at Clare Street at this time.

The 4th Battalion, The Northamptonshire Regiment converted to become the 50th Searchlight Regiment, Royal Artillery in 1940. This unit evolved to become the 637th Regiment, Royal Artillery (The Northamptonshire Regiment) in 1945 and 585th (The Northamptonshire Regiment) Searchlight Regiment, Royal Artillery in 1947. The presence at the drill hall was reduced to a single battery, R (The Northamptonshire Regiment) Battery, 438th Light Anti-Aircraft Regiment Royal Artillery in 1955. The battery amalgamated with the 5th Battalion, The Northamptonshire regiment to form the 4th/5th Battalion, The Northamptonshire Regiment in 1961. Following the cut-backs in 1967, the 7th (Volunteer) Battalion, The Royal Anglian Regiment was formed at the Clare Street drill hall in 1971. The presence at the drill hall was reduced to a single company, D (Northamptonshire) Company, 4th/5th Battalion, The Northamptonshire Regiment, in 1978. The presence at the drill hall was further reduced to a single platoon from C (Leicestershire and Northamptonshire) Company, the East of England Regiment in 1999 and from C (Leicestershire and Northamptonshire) Company, the 3rd Battalion, The Royal Anglian Regiment in 2006.

== Current units ==
The following units are based at the barracks:

British Army

- Headquarters, 103 Battalion, Royal Electrical and Mechanical Engineers
  - 118 Recovery Company

Community Cadet Forces

- Simpson Platoon, Leicestershire Northamptonshire and Rutland Army Cadet Force
- 5F (Northampton) Squadron, South & East Midlands Wing, Air Training Corps
