= St Mary's Street drill hall, Huntingdon =

St Mary's drill hall
- Huntingdon
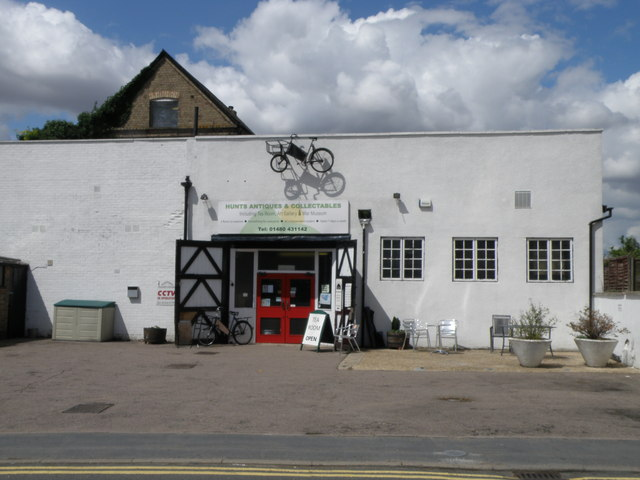
- St Mary's drill hall

Site information
- Type: Drill hall

Location
- Location within Cambridgeshire
- Coordinates: 52.32805°N 0.18255°W

Site history
- Built: Late 19th century
- Built for: War Office
- In use: Late 19th century-1920s

The St Mary's Street drill hall is a former military installation in Huntingdon, Cambridgeshire.

== History ==
The building was designed as the headquarters of the 1st Huntingdonshire Rifle Volunteer Corps and completed in the late 19th century. The unit evolved to become the 4th Volunteer Battalion, The Bedfordshire Regiment in 1900. The presence at the drill hall was reduced to a single company, H Company, 5th Battalion, The Bedfordshire Regiment in 1908 but restored to a full battalion when the Huntingdonshire Cyclist Battalion was formed in February 1914. The battalion was mobilised at the drill hall in August 1914 but remained in the United Kingdom throughout the First World War. The battalion was disbanded at the end of the War and the drill hall was subsequently decommissioned and converted for retail use.
