= 1st Northamptonshire Rifle Volunteer Corps =

1st Northamptonshire Rifle Volunteer Corps 4th Battalion, Northamptonshire Regiment 50th (Northamptonshire Regiment) Searchlight Regiment, RA 585 (Northamptonshire Regiment) Searchlight Regiment, RA
- Active: 29 August 1859 – 10 March 1955
- Country: United Kingdom
- Branch: Territorial Army
- Role: Infantry; Air Defence
- Part of: 162nd (East Midland) Brigade
- Garrison/HQ: Clare Street drill hall, Northampton
- Engagements: First World War: Gallipoli; Senussi Campaign; Palestine; Second World War: Blitz; Operation Diver; Operation Doomsday

Commanders
- Notable commanders: John Spencer, 5th Earl Spencer; William Fitzroy, Earl of Euston; Henry James Fitzroy, Earl of Euston

The 1st Northamptonshire Rifle Volunteers were a unit of the British Army raised from 1859 onwards as a group of originally separate Rifle Volunteer Corps (RVCs). They later became the 4th Volunteer Battalion of the Northamptonshire Regiment and saw action in the Gallipoli and Palestine campaigns during the First World War. Converted into a searchlight unit between the wars, they served in the defence of the United Kingdom and as an infantry regiment in liberated Norway during the Second World War. After the war, they continued in the air defence role until 1961 when they reverted to infantry as part of the Royal Anglian Regiment.

== Early history ==
An invasion scare in 1859 led to the creation of the Volunteer Force and huge enthusiasm throughout Great Britain for joining local RVCs. The War Office issued a Circular Letter on 12 May inviting volunteers, and within three days Earl Spencer had offered to raise a company from his tenants at Althorp in Northamptonshire. This became the Althorp Rifles, later 1st Northamptonshire RVC. The unit had a song, sung to the tune of The British Grenadiers:

Now every man of sense, Sir,
Should welcome with three cheers
And rally round Lord Spencer
and the Althorp Volunteers.

Within months the following units had been raised in the county:

- 1st Northamptonshire RVC at Althorp with the 5th Earl Spencer appointed to command on 29 August 1859.
- 2nd Northamptonshire RVC raised at Towcester after a meeting held at the Pomfret Hotel on 12 July 1859 with the 5th Earl of Pomfret appointed to command on 19 October.
- 3rd Northamptonshire RVC planned at Northampton but converted to Mounted Rifles in March 1860 (see below).
- 4th Northamptonshire RVC raised from 'professional men and tradesmen' after a meeting at Northampton Town Hall on 2 June 1859, with the first officers commissioned on 15 February 1860.
- 5th Northamptonshire RVC raised from employees of the military contractor Isaac, Campbell & Co at Northampton, with the company's proprietor Samuel Isaac appointed as captain and his brother Saul Isaac as lieutenant on 3 March 1860.
- 6th Northamptonshire RVC raised at Peterborough, with the Hon George Wentworth-Fitzwilliam, former MP for Peterborough, appointed as commanding officer 3 March 1860.
- 7th Northamptonshire RVC raised at Wellingborough, with the first officers commissioned on 20 September 1860
- 8th Northamptonshire RVC raised at Daventry with Sir Rainald Knightley, Bart, MP for South Northamptonshire, appointed to command on 23 November 1860.

All these units were included in the 1st Administrative Battalion, Northamptonshire RVCs, in 1860, under the command of William Fitzroy, Earl of Euston (later 6th Duke of Grafton), as lieutenant-colonel, with Earl Spencer and the Earl of Pomfret as majors. (There was no 2nd Admin Bn in Northamptonshire.) The 1st Northamptonshire RVC established its headquarters (HQ) at Clare Street drill hall, Northampton. On 1 June 1860 the new 4th and 5th Northampton RVCs took part in a brigade field day with the Northamptonshire Militia, which was just finishing its annual training, and a field battery of the Royal Artillery from Northampton Barracks.

Three further volunteer corps were later raised in the county and added to the 1st Admin Bn:

- 1st Northamptonshire Mounted Rifle Volunteer Corps, raised at Overstone 3 Mar 1860 by Col Robert Loyd-Lindsay, VC, joined 1st Admin Bn 1862.
- 1st Northamptonshire Engineer Volunteer Corps at Peterborough, raised 1867.
- 9th Northamptonshire RVC raised at Kettering, 22 April 1867.

The 1st Northamptonshire MRV was absorbed by the 4th Northampton RVC in 1863 and the 1st Northampton EVC transferred to the 2nd Tower Hamlets EVC in 1872. Also in 1872, the 4th and 5th RVCs amalgamated to form a new 3rd corps. Sir Henry Fletcher, Baronet, was appointed Captain of the 1st RVC in 1866, and Henry James Fitzroy (later Earl of Euston, nephew of the 6th Duke of Grafton) of the 2nd RVC in 1872. After Fitzroy had been promoted to major in 1874, Sir Hereward Wake, 12th Baronet, was captain of the 2nd RVC from 1877 to 1887, by special permission, because he simultaneously held a commission in the Militia.

The Administrative Battalion was consolidated as the 1st Northamptonshire RVC in 1880, with the following organisation:

- A Company (ex 1st RVC)
- B Company (ex 2nd RVC)
- C to G Companies (ex 3rd RVC)
- H and I Companies (ex 6th RVC)
- K and L Companies (ex 7th RVC)
- M Company (ex 8th RVC)
- N Company (ex 9th RVC)

Under the Childers Reforms of 1881, the 1st Northampton RVC was attached as a Volunteer Battalion to the Northamptonshire Regiment on 1 July, and formally changed its title to 1st Volunteer Battalion, Northamptonshire Regiment, in December 1887. (As with the Admin Bn, there was no 2nd Volunteer Bn). The Earl of Euston took over as Lt-Col Commandant on 4 February 1882.

In the mobilisation scheme introduced after the Stanhope Memorandum of December 1888, the battalion initially formed part of the South Midland Brigade, which would have assembled at Warwick in the event of war. Later it joined the volunteer battalions of the Suffolk Regiment in the Harwich Brigade, tasked with defending the naval base at Harwich.

By 1900 the unit had grown to a double battalion of 16 companies distributed as follows:

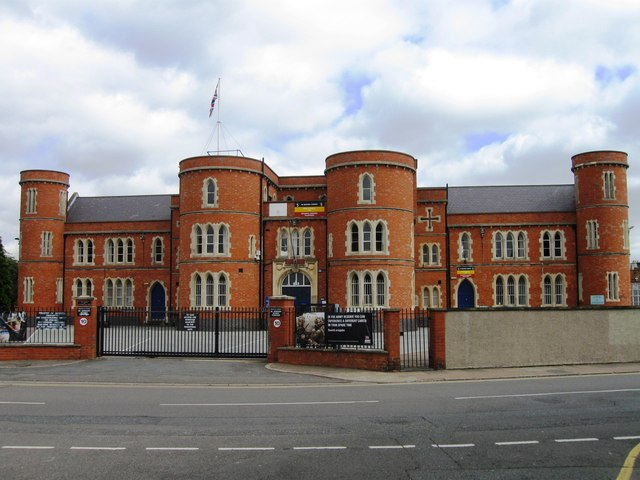
Clare Street drill hall, Northampton.

- A Company at Althorp
- HQ and B to F Companies at Northampton
- G and H Companies at Peterborough
- I and K Companies at Wellingborough
- L Company at Daventry
- M and N Companies (one of them composed of cyclists) at Kettering
- O Company at Rushden
- Q Company at Desborough and Rothwell
- R Company at Raunds

In December 1899 the Volunteers were invited to form special service companies to reinforce their Regular battalions serving in Second Boer War. Volunteers from the 1st VB Northamptons disembarked at Cape Town in February 1900, and took their place as I Company with the 2nd Northamptons, gaining the Battle Honour South Africa 1900–1902 for the unit.

After the Boer War the battalion joined with the volunteer battalions of the Bedfordshire Regiment to form the Bedford Brigade in Eastern Command.

== Territorial Force ==
When the Volunteer Force was subsumed into the new Territorial Force (TF) as part of the Haldane reforms of 1908, the bulk of the 1st Volunteer Bn became the 4th Battalion Northamptonshire Regiment, but the Peterborough companies were converted to form the Northamptonshire Battery of the Royal Field Artillery and the East Midland Brigade Company of the Army Service Corps.

The 4th Bn Northamptonshire Regiment formed part of the East Midland Brigade of the East Anglian Division.

== First World War ==
=== Mobilisation ===
On 26 July 1914, the 4th Northamptons went into camp at Ashridge Park for annual training. When the order to mobilise was received on 4 August, it returned to its Clare Street drill hall at Northampton and by 10 August the battalion was at its war station at Romford as the East Anglian Division concentrated in Essex. On 20 August it moved to Bury St Edmunds and formed part of the East Coast defences until the following May. Meanwhile, the formation of duplicate or 2nd Line TF units from Home Service men and recruits had been authorised, and towards the end of 1914 the 2nd East Anglian Division came into existence at Peterborough. The original battalion became the 1/4th, and its 2nd Line became the 2/4th. Later a 3/4th Battalion was formed.

=== 1/4th Northamptons ===
After the Home Service men and the unfit had been transferred to the 2/4th Bn, the 1/4th was brought up to strength with recruits and training continued at Bury St Edmunds. The battalion moved to Thetford in Norfolk in November 1914. At Easter 1915 the East Anglian Division moved into the coast defences, the 1/4th Bn being stationed in Norwich. In May the battalion moved back to Bury St Edmunds to fit out with tropical kit for overseas service. The 1st East Anglian Division was now numbered as the 54th (East Anglian) Division, with the East Midlands Brigade becoming 162nd (East Midland) Brigade. On 29 July the 1/4th Northamptons entrained, and sailed the following day from Devonport aboard the transport Royal George.

==== Gallipoli ====
In the early hours of 15 August the battalion transhipped to the destroyers Foxhound and Scourge and ran in to Suvla Bay on the Gallipoli Peninsula, landing from small boats onto the beach. At the end of the day it was moved up to support the rest of 162nd Brigade, which had been engaged throughout the day. On 17 August the battalion moved into the front line. In trench warfare, it lost three officers and seven other ranks killed, and three officers and 53 other ranks wounded by the end of August.

At the beginning of September the 1/4th Northamptons were transferred to 163rd (Norfolk & Suffolk) Brigade in 54th Division, and remained with it until the end of the campaign. This brigade held the Hill 60 sector and the battalion spent its time between that place and 'South Wales Borderers Valley'. The trench lines were close together, within hand grenade range, and between 3 September and 30 November the battalion suffered battle casualties of 35 killed and 129 wounded, as well as a large number of sick. On 27 November the battalion was due to be withdrawn for a month's rest at Mudros, but torrential rain brought all movement to a halt, followed by freezing conditions, and the battalion was not relieved until 8 December, having suffered further casualties.

==== Egypt ====
After a week at Mudros, the battalion was transferred to Egypt, landing at Alexandria on 18 December. On 30 December it was moved by rail and foot to the Western Desert in support of the cavalry and armoured cars operating against the Senussi before returning to camp near Cairo in January 1916. Here the 54th Division was concentrated, and the battalion was brought up to strength with drafts, including men from the Royal Warwickshire Regiment and Leicestershire Regiment who had seen service on the Western Front.

In April 1916, after rest, the division took up positions in No 1 (Southern) Section of the Suez Canal defences, remaining in this area for the rest of the year. In the autumn the battalion embarked to join T. E. Lawrence and the Arab Revolt, but the move was countermanded. On 9 January 1917, the 1/4th Northamptons went into camp for training, and at the end of the month entrained for Kantara to begin the march across the Sinai Peninsula preparatory to the advance into Palestine.

==== Palestine ====
On 26 March the 1/4th Northamptons were ordered to entrench a position on the Gaza road to cover the mounted troops during the First Battle of Gaza. However, at midnight they were informed that the action had been broken off and they were in danger of being cut off. After a tricky withdrawal, the battalion rejoined the rest of 162nd Bde. For the Second Battle of Gaza on 17 April, the battalion supported 1/5th Bedfordshire Regiment and 1/11th London Regiment. Two days later the Northamptons took over the lead, advancing towards the Beersheba road against strongly entrenched Turkish troops. The battalion reached but could not enter the trenches, and by 16.30 about 80 per cent of the leading companies had become casualties and they were pinned down. The survivors withdrew after nightfall, having suffered 10 officers and 366 other ranks killed, wounded and missing.

Stationary trench warfare having set in, the battalion was brought up to strength before a new attempt on the Turkish position (the Third Battle of Gaza) began on 2 November. After the 161st and 163rd Brigades had advanced up the coast to capture the Gaza defences, A Company 1/4th Northamptons was to pass through with tanks in support and capture the positions known as 'Lion', 'Tiger' and 'Dog', north west of Gaza, clear the beach of Wire entanglements to allow the cavalry through, and finally to occupy a defensive line to cover their withdrawal if required. By 06.30 the first part of the operation had succeeded, and A Company passed through, and captured 'Lion' about 1500 yards further on within an hour, despite the breakdown of the tanks and the ineffectiveness of the covering machine-gun barrage due to mist. The wire on the beach was cleared, but the remaining objectives could not be taken before the Turks counter-attacked. The company was so far ahead of support that it had to be withdrawn. Further attempts at the same operation also failed in face of counterattacks. The Northamptons suffered heavy casualties: five officers and 45 other ranks killed, three officers and 129 other ranks wounded, and 33 missing. However, the attack on the Beersheba position was successful and the Turks retreated, the 1/4th reaching the outskirts of Jaffa by 25 November.

On 27 November the weak (400 strong) battalion distinguished itself at Wilhelma, decisively repulsing three attacks made by 3000 Turks with ample artillery support. When the battalion's flanks were threatened, the CO ordered counter-attacks by two platoons on each flank to restore the position. The action protected the vital Jaffa–Jerusalem road, the main supply route for the British force advancing to capture Jerusalem.

The next forward movement was not until March 1918, after which trench warfare set in again. In June the 54th Division was ordered to reinforce the Western Front, the 4th Northamptons entraining for Kantara. But the order was rescinded and the 54th returned to Palestine.

The final offensive of the Egyptian Expeditionary Force (EEF), known as the Battle of Megiddo, opened on 19 September 1918 with the Battle of Sharon. 162nd Brigade formed the second wave, attacking at 09.40 into considerable machine-gun and shell fire. The battalion pressed on despite the heat and casualties (including the CO mortally wounded) and reached their objective by 06.45 the following morning after a running fight of 14 miles in which it had taken numerous German and Turkish prisoners for the loss of 75 killed and wounded. As a result of the EEF's attacks on 19/20 September, the Turks retreated and the cavalry took up pursuit.

54th Division was then taken out of the line and concentrated at Haifa, where it was engaged in repairing communications for the rapidly advancing army. Although the 4th Northamptons marched north, reaching Beirut on 31 October, they saw no more fighting; the Armistice of Mudros was signed on that day. On 4 December they embarked to return to Kantara by sea. In early 1919 the battalion took part in suppressing riots in Egypt, which delayed demobilisation. The cadre of the battalion reached Northampton on 4 November 1919.

=== 2/4th Northamptons ===
The 2/4th Battalion formed at Northampton on 27 November 1914. It constituted part of 2nd East Midland Brigade in 2nd East Anglian Division. Early in 1915, the division (which was numbered 69th in August 1915, with the 2nd East Midland Brigade becoming 207th) concentrated round Thetford, where it formed part of First Army in Central Force. The 2nd Line TF divisions were now being prepared to follow the 1st Line overseas, and in May 1915 the remaining Home Service men were removed from the battalion and posted to the 62nd Provisional Battalion (see below). However, the constant drain of trained drafts sent overseas meant that the 69th Division was never ready for active service, and it remained on Home Defence for the whole war. It moved to Harrogate in North Yorkshire in June 1916, then to Stockton-on-Tees in October. By May 1917 it was at Carburton Camp in Nottinghamshire, moving by October to Clipstone Camp. The weakened 2/4th Bn was disbanded on 14 March 1918 at Clipstone and its remaining personnel posted to the 4th Reserve Bn.

=== 3/4th Northamptons ===
The 3/4th Battalion was formed at Northampton on 12 May 1915. It moved to Windsor Great Park in August, and then to Halton Park in October. On 8 April 1916 it was renamed the 4th Reserve Bn, forming part of the East Anglian Reserve Brigade at Halton. In August 1917 the battalion moved again, to Crowborough, where it later absorbed the 2/4th Bn. In September 1918 it moved to St Leonards-on-Sea and remained there until disbanded on 28 July 1919 after the end of the war.

=== 62nd Provisional Battalion ===
In June 1915, the Home Service men of the 2/4th Northamptons were posted, together with those of the 2/1st Cambridgeshire Regiment, to form the 62nd Provisional Battalion. This was a coast defence battalion forming part of 3rd Provisional Brigade, attached to 69th Division in Norfolk.

=== 9th Northamptons ===
The Military Service Act 1916 swept away the Home/Foreign service distinction, and all TF soldiers became liable for overseas service, if medically fit. The Provisional Battalions thus became anomalous, and on 1 January 1917 the 62nd Bn became 9th Bn Northamptonshire Regiment in 223rd Mixed Brigade. Part of its role was physical conditioning to render men fit for drafting overseas. Based initially at Cley next the Sea, it moved to Sheringham in mid-1918 and remained on the Norfolk coast until disbandment on 24 March 1919.

== Interwar ==
The 4th Bn Northamptonshire Regiment was reformed with the TF on 7 February 1920 (the TF was reconstituted as the Territorial Army (TA) the following year). Once again, it formed part of 162 (East Midlands) Brigade in 54 (East Anglian) Division. The four companies were at Northampton, Rushden, Wellingborough and Kettering.

The battalion had four affiliated cadet corps in 1921:

- The King's School, Peterborough
- Northampton School for Boys
- Magdalen College School, Brackley
- Kettering Grammar School

In 1930 a machine-gun company was added to the establishment and the 4th Battalion was reorganised with HQ, A and B (Machine Gun) Companies at Northampton (with a platoon at Towcester), C Company at Wellingborough, Rushden, Raunds and Irthlingborough, and D Company at Kettering.

90 cm 'Projector Anti-Aircraft', displayed at Fort Nelson, Portsmouth.

In the 1930s the increasing need for anti-aircraft (AA) defence for Britain's cities was addressed by converting a number of TA infantry battalions into searchlight battalions of the Royal Engineers (RE). The 4th Northamptons was one unit selected for this role, becoming 50th (The Northamptonshire Regiment) AA Battalion, RE, on 1 October 1937, with the following organisation: (Note: A new 4th Battalion was raised just before the outbreak of war in 1939 as a duplicate of the regiment's other TA battalion, the 5th (Huntingdonshire). The new 4th Bn served in home defence for most of the war, and finally on the lines of communication in North West Europe. It was merged back into the 5th Bn after the war.)

- HQ at Northampton
- 400th AA Company at Northampton
- 401st AA Company at Northampton
- 402nd AA Company at Peterborough
- 403rd AA Company at Kettering

The unit was subordinated to 34th (South Midland) AA Group (later Brigade) (later Brigade) as part of 2nd AA Division in Anti-Aircraft Command.

== Second World War ==
=== Mobilisation ===
The TA's AA units were mobilised on 23 September 1938 during the Munich Crisis, with units manning their emergency positions within 24 hours, even though many did not yet have their full complement of men or equipment. The emergency lasted three weeks, and they were stood down on 13 October. In February 1939 the existing AA defences came under the control of a new Anti-Aircraft Command. In June a partial mobilisation of TA units was begun in a process known as 'couverture', whereby each AA unit did a month's tour of duty in rotation to man selected AA and searchlight positions. On 24 August, ahead of the declaration of war, AA Command was fully mobilised at its war stations. By now 50th (Northamptonshire) AA Bn was part of 32nd (Midland) AA Brigade in 2nd AA Division.

On 1 August 1940, in common with the other RE AA battalions, the unit was transferred to the Royal Artillery (RA), becoming 50th (The Northamptonshire Regiment) Searchlight Regiment, RA., with the AA Companies redesignated Searchlight Batteries.

2nd AA Division's formation sign.

=== Blitz ===
By the Blitz of late 1940, 50 Searchlight Rgt had been transferred within 2 AA Division to 50th Light Anti-Aircraft Brigade, responsible for the air defence of Derby and Nottingham.

The regiment supplied a cadre of experienced officers and men to 233rd S/L Training Rgt at Saighton Camp where it provided the basis for a new 556 S/L Bty formed on 13 February 1941. This battery later joined a newly forming 92nd S/L Rgt.

In 1941 the searchlight layout over the Midlands was reorganised, so that any hostile raid approaching the Gun Defended Areas (GDA) around the towns must cross more than one searchlight belt, and then within the GDAs the concentration of lights was increased.

=== Mid-war ===
By the end of the Blitz in May 1941, 50th S/L Rgt was in 50th Light AA Bde in 2nd AA Division, and remained with it until June 1942 when it joined a newly formed 72nd AA Bde in 2nd AA Division, though 402 and 403 Btys remained attached to 50th AA Bde.

On 10 September 1942, 400 (Northampton) Battery was transferred to 30th (Surrey) Searchlight Regiment, Royal Artillery, which was preparing for service overseas. The regiment landed at Algiers in January 1943 and was the only British searchlight unit serving with Allied Force Headquarters (AFHQ) in North Africa. 400 Battery later moved into Tunisia as part of '30/62 S/L Regiment'. During the Italian Campaign, 30 S/L Regiment was once again the only British searchlight unit operating under AFHQ, but late in 1943 it was placed in suspended animation and its personnel dispersed to other units.

50th (Northampton) S/L Rgt remained with 72nd AA Bde until December 1942, when it left to join 47th AA Bde in 2 AA Group (which had replaced 2nd AA Division). It remained with this brigade throughout 1943.

=== Operation Diver ===
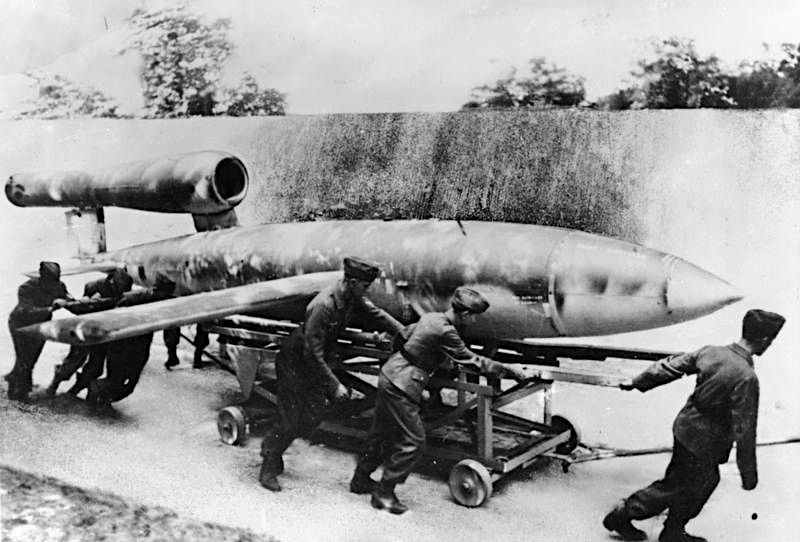
V-1 flying bomb being prepared for launch.

2 AA Group was responsible for defending the assembly camps, depots and embarkation ports for Operation Overlord (the Allied invasion of Normandy) and was planning for the expected onslaught of V-1 flying bombs (codenamed 'Divers') against London. Meanwhile, the group had to deal with a sharp increase in Luftwaffe air raids trying to reach London (the so-called 'Baby Blitz'), which continued until May. In June 1944 47 AA Bde was disbanded but 50th S/L Rgt simply transferred within 2 AA Gp to the command of 38th Light AA Bde.

On 13 June, a week after the Overlord fleets had left to launch D Day, the first V-1s appeared over southern England. 2 AA Group deployed its Light AA guns alongside S/L positions, hoping that the Searchlight Control radar (SLC) could guide the LAA guns at night. By day, the S/L positions used their AA Light machine guns in an effort to bring down the fast-moving missiles. The early success rate was low, but later fighter aircraft and radar-directed Heavy AA guns achieved high rates of success against V-1s.

=== 637 (Northamptonshire Regiment) Infantry Regiment, RA ===
By the end of 1944, the German Luftwaffe was suffering from such shortages of pilots, aircraft and fuel that serious aerial attacks on the UK could be discounted. At the same time 21st Army Group fighting in North West Europe was suffering a severe manpower shortage, particularly among the infantry. On 23 January 1945 the War Office began to reorganise surplus AA regiments in the UK into infantry battalions, primarily for line of communication and occupation duties, thereby releasing trained infantry for frontline service. On 23 January 1945 the regiment became 637 (The Northamptonshire Regiment) Infantry Regiment, RA. It formed part of 304 Infantry Bde (itself formed by conversion of 38th Light AA Bde).

In February the surplus (older or unfit) men were sent to Bursledon, near Southampton, where 82nd S/L Rgt was acting as a holding unit. The men remained with that regiment while they were awaiting posting or demobilisation. The regiment's Auxiliary Territorial Service (ATS) women were posted to AA brigade HQs.

After infantry training, including a short period attached to 55th (West Lancashire) Infantry Division, 304 Bde was sent to Norway in June 1945 following the liberation of that country (Operation Doomsday). Afterwards it was placed in suspended animation at Much Hadham, Hertfordshire, on 10 February 1946.

== Postwar ==
When the TA was reconstituted on 1 January 1947, the regiment was reformed as 585 (The Northamptonshire Regiment) Searchlight Regiment, RA, forming part of 76 AA Bde (the former 50 AA Bde). It retained the right to wear the Northamptons' cap badge. The regiment was redesignated a Mixed Light Anti-Aircraft/Searchlight Regiment in March 1949 ('Mixed' indicating that personnel of the Women's Royal Army Corps were integrated within the unit).

When AA Command was disbanded on 10 March 1955, there was a considerable reduction in the number of TA air defence units. As a result, 585 Regiment was amalgamated with 262 Heavy Anti-Aircraft Regiment and 579 (Royal Leicestershire Regiment) Light Anti-Aircraft Regiment to form 438 (Royal Leicestershire Regiment) Light Anti-Aircraft Regiment. The former 585 Rgt provided R (Northamptonshire Regiment) Battery in the new unit.

However, 438 LAA Regiment only lasted until 1961, when it was broken up. R Battery reverted to infantry and merged with 5th (Huntingdonshire) Battalion, Northamptonshire Regiment, to become 4th/5th Bn Northamptonshire Regiment, subsequently part of the Royal Anglian Regiment.

== Uniforms and insignia ==
The original uniform was grey with scarlet facings and the headgear was a shako, in which the 5th Northampton RVC wore a red tuft. The shako was replaced by a spiked helmet in 1879. When the Volunteers were affiliated to the Regular county regiments they were given the option of adopting the scarlet coat, but the 1st Northampton VB rejected this and retained the grey jacket. Only when the battalion became the 4th Northamptons did it adopt a scarlet uniform faced in white. The facings were changed to the buff of the old 48th Foot (1st Bn Northampton Regiment) in 1926.

In common with the Regular Rifle regiments, the Rifle Volunteers did not carry Regimental colours: the battalion's first colours were presented in June 1909 after it had become the 4th Northamptons in the TF.

Upon conversion to the RE and then the RA, the battalion was granted the right to retain its county regiment association by continuing to wear the Northamptonshire Regiment cap badge. This was kept until the amalgamation of 1955.

== Honorary Colonels ==
The following served as Honorary Colonels of the unit:

- Charles Spencer, 6th Earl Spencer, appointed Hon Col 4th Bn Northamptonshire Regt 1913.
- Albert Spencer, 7th Earl Spencer, appointed Hon Col 4th Bn Northamptonshire Regt 1924 and 50th (Northamptonshire Regt) AA Bn, RE, from 1937.

== Battle Honours ==
The battalion was awarded the following Battle Honours:

2nd Boer War:

- South Africa, 1900–1902

First World War

- Suvla
- Landing at Suvla
- Scimitar Hill
- Gallipoli, 1915
- Egypt, 1915–17
- Gaza
- El Mughar
- Nebi Samwil
- Jerusalem
- Jaffa
- Tell 'Asur
- Megiddo
- Sharon
- Palestine, 1917–18

Gaza was one of the 10 honours selected by the whole Northamptonshire Regiment to be emblazoned on the King's Colour.

The RE and RA do not carry battle honours, so none were awarded for service during the Second World War.
