= Battle of the Ypres–Comines Canal =

1940 battle in Belgium during WWII

- Part of the Battle of France and the Battle of Belgium
Date	26–28 May 1940
Location	Ypres-Comines Canal, Belgium
Result	Successful British delaying action: Withdrawal of the BEF to Dunkirk

Belligerents
United Kingdom; Belgium	(Nazi Germany) Germany

Commanders and leaders
(United Kingdom) Alan Brooke	(Nazi Germany) Gerd von Rundstedt

The Battle of the Ypres–Comines Canal was a battle of the Second World War fought between the British Expeditionary Force (BEF) and German Army Group B during the BEF's retreat to Dunkirk in 1940. Part of the Battle of Belgium and the much larger Battle of France, it started in the afternoon of 26 May and reached its maximum intensity on 27 and 28 May. Locally it is referred to as the Battle of the Canal and it is sometimes incorrectly referred to as the Battle of Wytschaete. Its official British Army name, which is borne on the battle honours of a number of regiments, is that given here.

== Background ==
The origins of the battle lay in the decision by Colonel-General Gerd von Rundstedt, the commander of German Army Group A, on 23 May to halt his armoured forces. This 'Halt Order' was later confirmed by Hitler. The responsibility for attacking the British, French and Belgian forces trapped in the pocket formed by Army Group A's advance to the coast now lay with Army Group B, on the Allies' eastern front.

On 24 May Army Group B launched an attack on the Belgian forces stationed along the River Lys east of Menin. This achieved rapid success and as a result Army Group B conceived the idea of changing the direction of attack from northwest to west, in order to cut off the British and French forces in the pocket from the coast. Orders to that effect were issued by German 6th Army, part of Army Group B, at 23.30 on 24 May. By 25 May the Belgian armies were retreating in a northerly direction and a gap between them and the British was opening up north of the Lys. This left the German forces space to carry out their planned change of direction. Lord Gort, the commander of the BEF, had intended to take part in a French led attack southwards in order to bridge the gap between the Allied forces in the pocket and the main French forces further south. However, by mid-afternoon on the 25th information was reaching Gort about the Belgian collapse and the consequent threat to his north-eastern front. At about 18.00 hours Gort took the decision that 5th Division, which was to have participated in the attack southwards, should instead go north in order to defend the Ypres-Comines Canal running between those two towns.

During the 25th the German 6th Army orders, issued on the 24th, concerning the attack westwards were captured by a British unit and made their way back to Gort. It has often been said that this capture caused Gort to take his decision, but it seems clear that he had, in fact, taken it before he was shown the captured orders.

== Prelude ==
The British 5th Division, comprising 13th and 17th Infantry brigades augmented by 143rd Brigade, from 48th (South Midland) Infantry Division, took up position on the Canal during 26 May. The 5th Division was commanded by Major-General Harold Franklyn. During the battle the division was part of British II Corps commanded by Lieutenant-General Alan Brooke. The 50th (Northumbrian) Infantry Division was also sent to Ypres on 26 May, arriving during the night of 26–27 May. However, it played relatively little part in the battle, which mainly took place south of the town. British troops came across a few Belgian engineers who were prepping bridges on the western part of Ypres for demolition. The German unit involved was IV Corps, under German 6th Army which was part of Army Group B. It was commanded by General Viktor von Schwedler and consisted of Infantry divisions (ID) 18, 31 and 61. The Germans, therefore, started with a considerable superiority in numbers although this was reduced as British reinforcements were fed into the battle.

== Battle ==
The Germans started probing attacks on the afternoon of the 26th and launched a full-scale attack on the morning of 27 May. By mid afternoon the British line had been forced back, with penetrations of over a mile in the south and north. From late afternoon onwards the British launched a series of counterattacks. Units involved included the 2nd Cameronians (Scottish Rifles) (13 Brigade) in the centre, and the 6th Black Watch (Royal Highland Regiment), 13th/18th Royal Hussars, 1/7th & 8th Royal Warwickshire Regiment and Royal Engineers units further south. Later another counter-attack in the south was launched by the 2nd North Staffordshire Regiment and the 3rd Grenadier Guards, borrowed by Brooke from 1st Infantry Division. As a result, ID 31's attack in the centre was halted while ID 61 in the south was driven back almost to the Canal. In the north, however, ID 18 continued to advance on the southern side of Ypres. On the 28th the German advance restarted, but made little progress in the centre and south. Some further advances were made in the north but Brooke had switched 10 Brigade from 4th Division and it stabilised the front here.

Throughout the battle the British artillery, which was mainly stationed on the Messines–Wytschaete Ridge, had done much to break up German attacks. There were the equivalent of six field artillery regiments and five medium and heavy regiments. Because of this the British probably had a larger artillery presence than the Germans, and contributed to the British defence.

== Significance ==
During the night of 27-28 May most of the British forces south of the Lys—four divisions in all—crossed and made their way northwards. 5th and 50th divisions pulled out on the night of 28-29 May. 5th Division's stand had been critical in allowing a substantial part of the fighting strength of the BEF to reach Dunkirk. Therefore, although total British casualties (including captured) exceeded those of the Germans, the battle was an important success for the BEF. Much of the success was the result of Alan Brooke's prompt actions. During the 27th he borrowed the Guards and North Staffords, who participated in the second counterattack in the south, from 1st Division, and moved 10th Brigade to reinforce the centre and north.

== List of British units involved ==
Apart from units listed above, other British units involved in the battle included the following: 2nd battalion of the City of London regiment, Royal Fusiliers', 2nd Royal Scots Fusiliers, 2nd Northamptonshire Regiment, 6th Seaforth Highlanders (all 17 Brigade); 2nd Wiltshire Regiment, 2nd Royal Inniskilling Fusiliers (both 13 Brigade); 1st Oxfordshire and Buckinghamshire Light Infantry, 1/7th and 8th Royal Warwickshire Regiment (all 143 Brigade); 12th Royal Lancers (GHQ reconnaissance regiment); 2nd Sherwood Foresters (1st Division); 2nd Duke of Cornwall's Light Infantry, 2nd Bedfordshire and Hertfordshire Regiment, 1/6th East Surrey Regiment (all 10th Brigade, (4th Division); 1/7th Middlesex Regiment, 1/9th Manchester Regiment and 4th Gordon Highlanders (all machine-gun battalions); 1/6th South Staffordshire Regiment (pioneer battalion); and in 50th Division, battalions of the Durham Light Infantry, East Yorkshire Regiment, Green Howards and Royal Northumberland Fusiliers.
