= Samuel Needham =

Recipient of the Victoria Cross

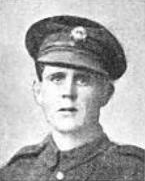
- Born: 16 August 1885; Great Limber, Lincolnshire, England
- Died: 4 November 1918 (aged 33); Kantara, Egypt
- Burial place: Kantara War Memorial Cemetery, Egypt
- Military career
- Allegiance: United Kingdom
- Branch: British Army
- Service years: 1914–1918
- Rank: Private
- Service number: 203329
- Units: Army Service Corps; Bedfordshire Regiment
- Conflicts: World War I
- Awards: Victoria Cross

Private Samuel Needham VC (16 August 1885 − 4 November 1918) was a British Army soldier and an English recipient of the Victoria Cross (VC), the highest and most prestigious award for gallantry in the face of the enemy that can be awarded to British and Commonwealth forces.

== Details ==
Needham was 33 years old, and a private in the 1/5th Battalion, The Bedfordshire Regiment, British Army during the First World War when the following deed took place for which he was awarded the VC.

On 10/11 September 1918 at Kefr Kasim, Palestine, one of the patrolling forces was attacked by a significant enemy force with heavy fire support. At a critical moment, Needham turned back to face the enemy and rapidly fired at roughly 40 Turks at only 30 yards range. This action halted the enemy and granted the patrol commander enough time to rally his men again. Despite casualties reaching half of the patrol, they managed to recover all of their wounded.

He took his own life, being killed by a self inflicted wound (ref: Mick Brand) at Kantara, Egypt on 4 November 1918.

His VC is displayed at the Bedfordshire and Hertfordshire Regimental Collection at the Wardown Park Museum, Luton, Bedfordshire.
