= Army Cyclist Corps =

World War I British Army corps

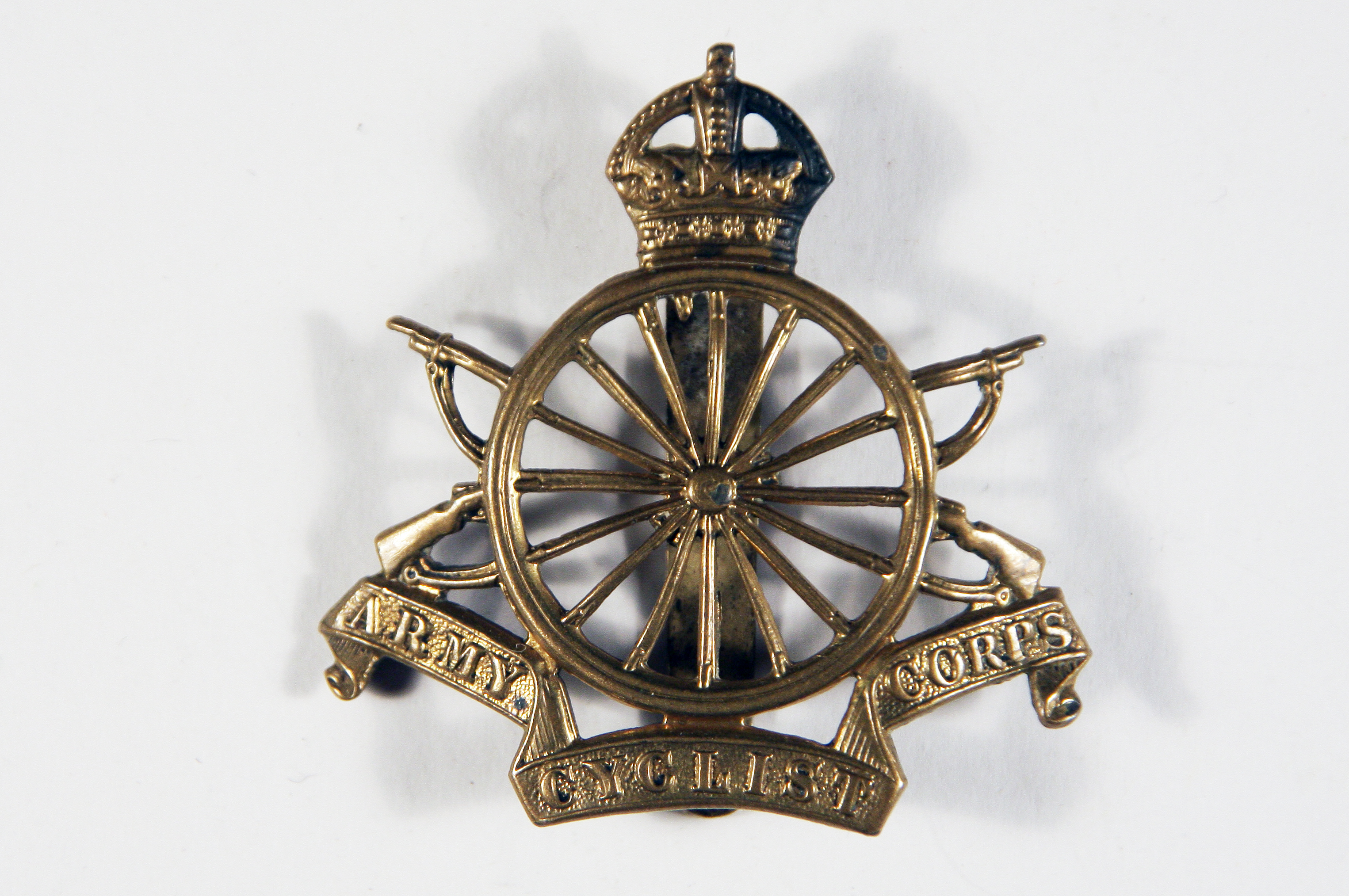
Cap badge

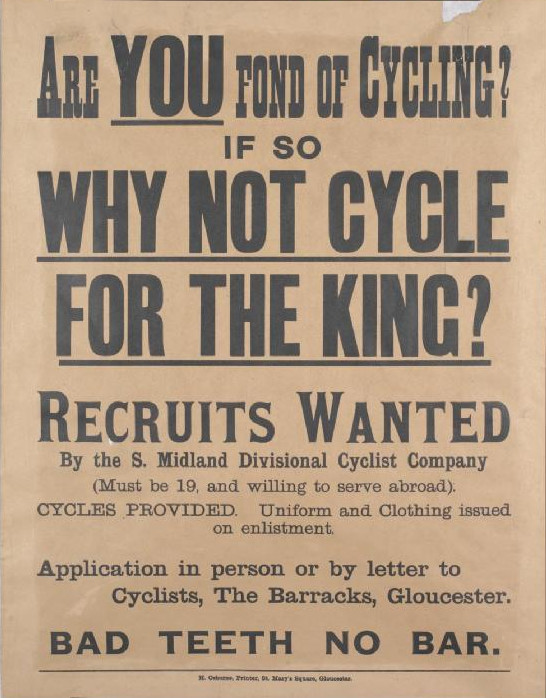
Recruiting poster for the 48th (South Midland) Division Cyclist Company

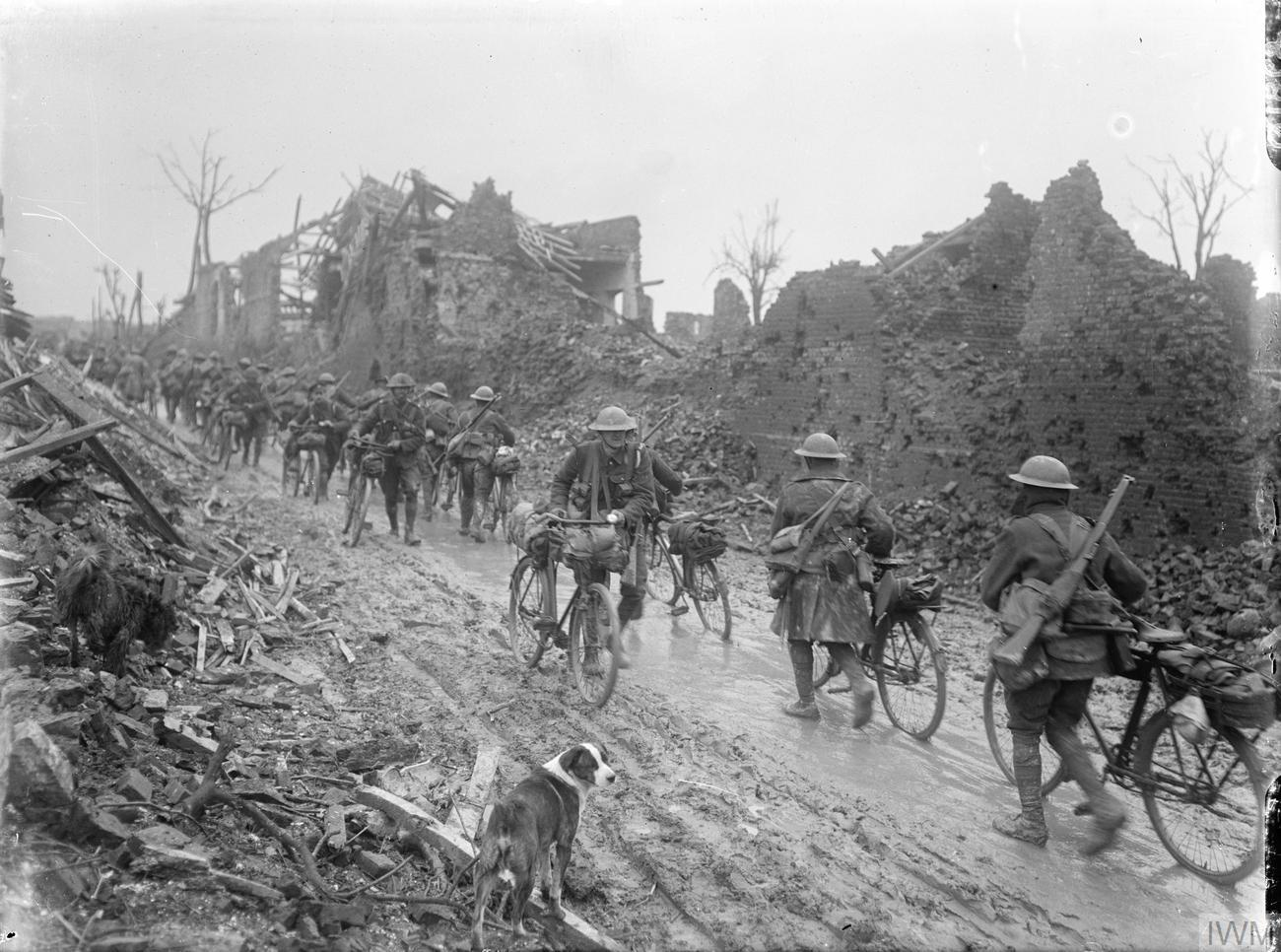
British cyclist troops advance through Brie, Somme, 1917

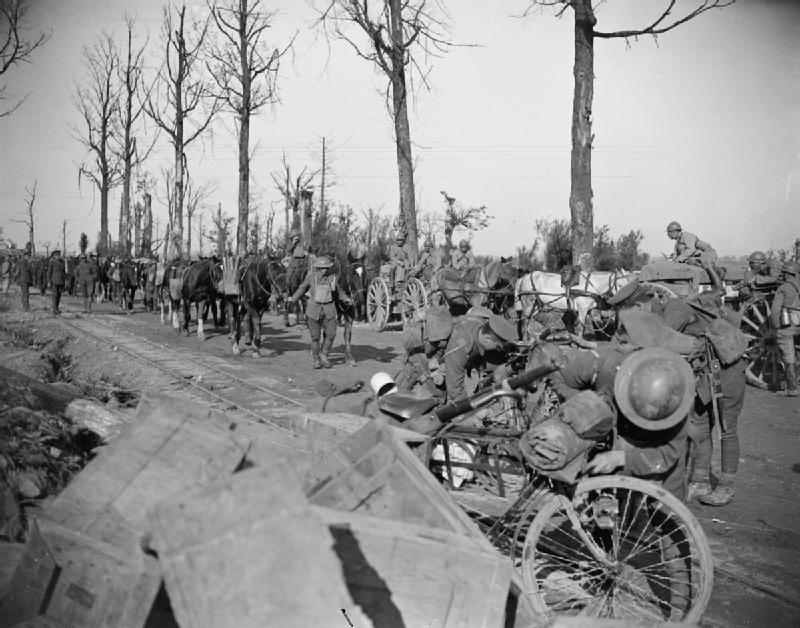
Cyclists of the 36th (Ulster) Division in France, 1918

The Army Cyclist Corps was a corps of the British Army active during the First World War, and controlling the Army's bicycle infantry.

== History ==
=== Formation ===
Volunteer cyclist units had been formed as early as the 1880s, with the first complete bicycle unit (the 26th Middlesex Rifle Volunteers) being raised in 1888. Cyclists were employed on an intermittent basis during the South African War – whilst they were not deployed as organised combat formations, the bicycle was found to be invaluable for reconnaissance and communications work, being lighter, quieter, and logistically much easier to support than horses. When the Haldane reforms in 1908 reorganised the volunteers into the Territorial Force, nine battalions of cyclists were formed - one from the 26th Middlesex, five from volunteer infantry battalions, and three newly raised.

- 10th (Cyclist) Battalion, Royal Scots
- 8th (Cyclist) Battalion, Northumberland Fusiliers; later the Northern Cyclist Battalion
- 6th (Cyclist) Battalion, Norfolk Regiment
- The Essex and Suffolk Cyclist Battalion
- 5th (Cyclist) Battalion, East Yorkshire Regiment
- 7th (Cyclist) Battalion, Welsh Regiment
- 8th (Cyclist) Battalion, Black Watch (Royal Highlanders); later the Highland Cyclist Battalion
- 6th (Cyclist) Battalion, Queen's Own (Royal West Kent Regiment); later the Kent Cyclist Battalion
- 25th (County of London) Cyclist Battalion, London Regiment (from the 26th Middlesex)

A tenth, the 7th (Cyclist) Battalion, Devonshire Regiment, was raised later in 1908; in 1910, the Essex and Suffolk Cyclist Battalion split into the 6th (Cyclist) Battalion, Suffolk Regiment, and the 8th (Cyclist) Battalion, Essex Regiment; in 1911, the 9th (Cyclist) Battalion, Hampshire Regiment and 6th (Cyclist) Battalion, Royal Sussex Regiment were formed and, in early 1914, the Huntingdonshire Cyclist Battalion was formed. On the eve of the First World War, the Territorial Force thus stood at a strength of fourteen cyclist battalions. Ten of these were Territorial battalions of regular infantry regiments, whilst four – the Northern, Highland, Kent, and Huntingdonshire Cyclists – were independent battalions without regimental affiliation.

=== Wartime service ===
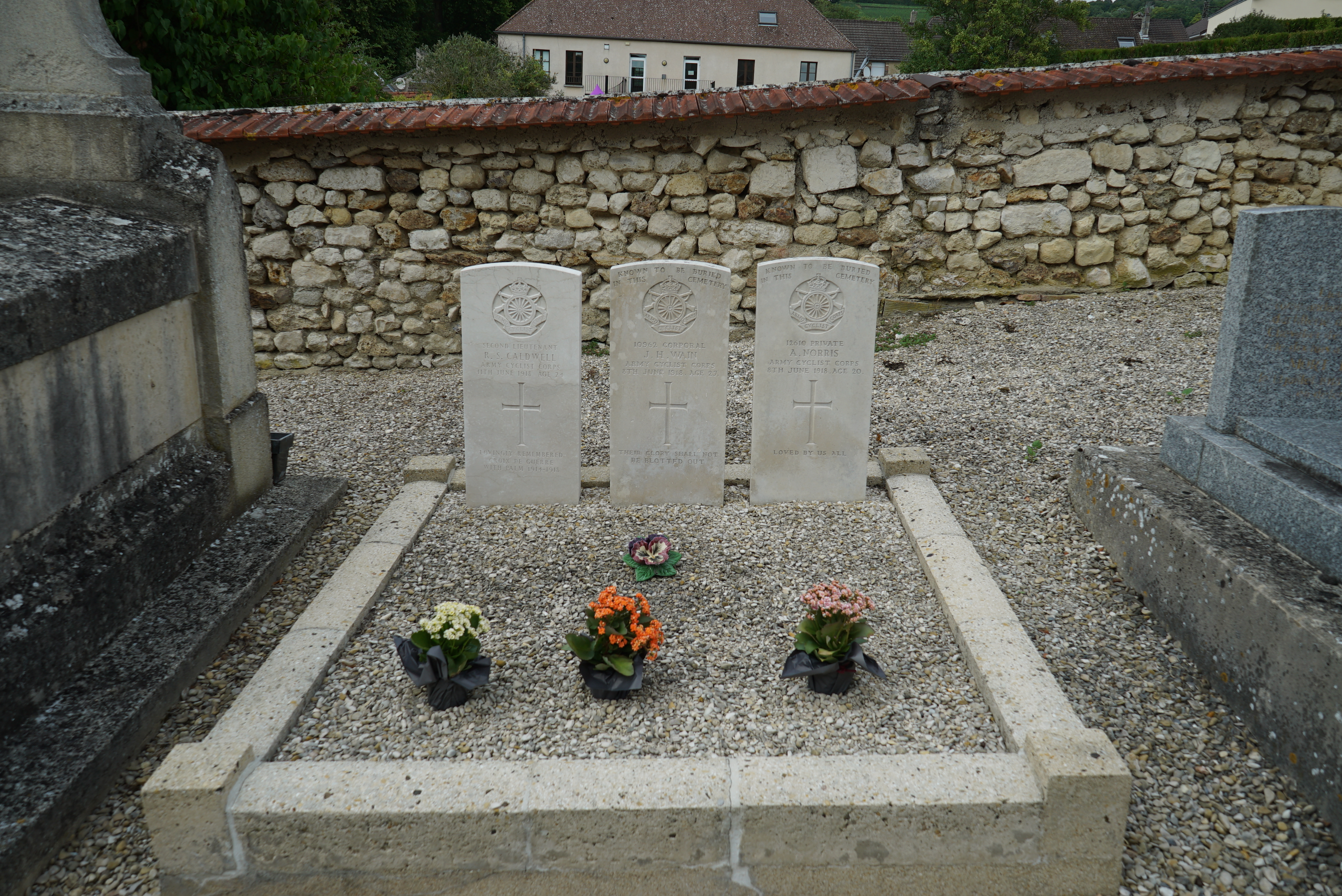
The headstones at Vandières of R.S. Caldwell (aged 24), J.H. Wain (age 27) and A. Norris, members of the Army Cyclist Corps, died June 1918

In accordance with the Territorial and Reserve Forces Act 1907 (7 Edw. 7, c.9) which brought the Territorial Force into being, the TF was intended to be a home defence force for service during wartime and members could not be compelled to serve outside the country. However, on the outbreak of war on 4 August 1914, many members volunteered for Imperial Service. Therefore, TF units were split in August and September 1914 into 1st Line (liable for overseas service) and 2nd Line (home service for those unable or unwilling to serve overseas) units. Later, a 3rd Line was formed to act as a reserve, providing trained replacements for the 1st and 2nd Line regiments.

On the outbreak of the First World War, the cyclist battalions were employed on Coastal Defences in the United Kingdom. Their role was considered to be so important that, initially, none of them were sent overseas. In 1915, the Army Cyclist Corps was founded to encompass these battalions; it later extended to cover a dozen more battalions raised from second-line yeomanry regiments which had been converted to cyclists.

Most units of the Corps served out their time in the United Kingdom, providing replacement drafts to infantry battalions; some were converted back to conventional infantry and saw active service, such as the Kent Cyclists (on the North-West Frontier) or the 2/10th Royal Scots (in northern Russia). Cyclists, as well as cavalry, of the British Salonika Army were used to patrol villages in the Struma Valley, in order to deny them to the Bulgarians and Turks.

Formed units of the Corps were not sent overseas; this was done in small groups of men, with the divisions possessing individual cyclist companies and composite battalions later formed at corps level. These were rarely committed to action, rather being held back in preparation for the resumption of "normal" mobile warfare. Cyclists were employed in combat, but in conditions of trench warfare they were generally found to be ineffective. In 1918, however, with the deadlock of the trenches overcome, cyclists once more proved invaluable for reconnaissance.

Two battalions, 25th (County of London) Cyclist Battalion and the Kent Cyclist Battalion fought in the Third Anglo-Afghan War.

=== Disbanded ===
The Corps was disbanded in 1920; by 1922 all remaining Territorial cyclist battalions had been converted back to conventional units.

- 10th (Cyclist) Battalion, Royal Scots (Lothian Regiment), was not re-formed after the war; its personnel were transferred to artillery and engineer units
- 6th (Cyclist) Battalion, Norfolk Regiment, was re-formed as East Anglian Division Royal Engineers
- 7th (Cyclist) Battalion, Devonshire Regiment, was due to be converted to artillery in 1920; this was not accepted by the members of the battalion who chose to disband instead
- 6th (Cyclist) Battalion, Suffolk Regiment, was re-formed as 58th (Suffolk) Medium Brigade, Royal Garrison Artillery (Note: The basic organic unit of the Royal Artillery was, and is, the battery. When grouped together they formed brigades, in the same way that infantry battalions or cavalry regiments were grouped together in brigades. Artillery brigades were redesignated as regiments in 1938.)
- 5th (Cyclist) Battalion, East Yorkshire Regiment, was re-formed as part of 50th (Northumbrian) Divisional Signals
- 6th (Cyclist) Battalion, Royal Sussex Regiment, was disbanded in December 1919 and not re-formed
- 9th (Cyclist) Battalion, Hampshire Regiment, was not re-formed after the war
- 7th (Cyclist) Battalion, Welsh Regiment, was not re-formed after the war and its members were absorbed into the 6th (Glamorgan) Battalion of the regiment
- 8th (Cyclist) Battalion, Essex Regiment, was not re-formed after the war
- 25th (County of London) Cyclist Battalion, London Regiment, was re-formed as the 47th (London) Infantry Division Signals, in 1920
- Northern Cyclist Battalion was re-formed as 55th (Northumbrian) Medium Brigade, Royal Garrison Artillery
- Highland Cyclist Battalion was converted as part of the Highland Division Signals
- Kent Cyclist Battalion was converted as a battery of the 52nd (Kent) Medium Brigade, Royal Garrison Artillery, in 1920
- Huntingdonshire Cyclist Battalion joined the Northamptonshire Regiment in 1920 as the 5th (Huntingdonshire) Battalion

== See also ==
- Australian Cycling Corps

== Bibliography ==
- Kirsch, Colin (2018). Bad Teeth No Bar: A History of Military Bicycles in the Great War. Unicorn Publishing Group. ISBN 978-1-91-050092-7.
- Rinaldi, Richard A (2008). Order of Battle of the British Army 1914. Ravi Rikhye. ISBN 978-0-97760728-0.
- Westlake, Ray (1986). The Territorial Battalions, A Pictorial History, 1859–1985. Tunbridge Wells: Spellmount.
