= John Macready (British Army officer) =

British Army general (1887–1957)

Brigadier John Macready DSO
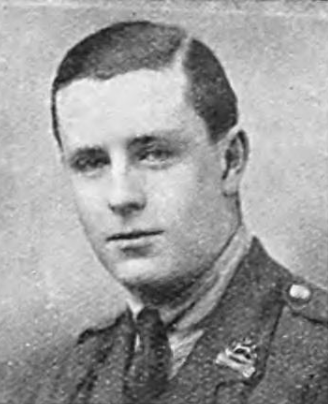
- Born: 10 April 1887; London, England
- Died: 27 February 1957 (aged 69); Folkestone, Kent, England
- Alma mater: Royal Military College, Sandhurst
- Spouse: Marguerite Mary Milling
- Children: 2
- Relatives: Jonathan F. Macready
- Military career
- Allegiance: United Kingdom
- Branch: British Army
- Service years: 1907−1945
- Rank: Brigadier
- Service number: 3971
- Unit: Bedfordshire Regiment
- Commands: 2nd Battalion, Bedfordshire and Hertfordshire Regiment; 162nd Infantry Brigade
- Conflicts: World War I World War II
- Awards: Distinguished Service Order

Brigadier John Macready (10 April 1887 – 27 February 1957) was a British Army officer who served with the Bedfordshire Regiment in Europe in World War I and in India. His father was Jonathan F. Macready, a son of the celebrated Victorian actor-theatre manager W.C.Macready.

== Military career ==
Macready was born in London West Queen Anne St. He trained at the Royal Military College and was appointed Second lieutenant in the Bedfordshire Regiment (later the Bedfordshire and Hertfordshire Regiment) in 1907. In the 1911 Census, his rank was Lieutenant. In 1913 he was promoted from Adjutant to Captain in the Bedfordshire Regiment. In 1916 he was awarded the D.S.O. and the Chevalier de l’Ordre de Leopold. In 1917, he was awarded the Croix de Guerre. From 1933-1937 he was Commanding Officer 2nd Battalion. Bedfordshire and Hertfordshire Regiment. In 1937 he was appointed Assistant Commandant of Hythe Wing, Small Arms School. From 1939-1940 he was Commanding Officer of 162nd (East Midland) Brigade.

== Family ==
Brig. Gen. Macready married Marguerite Mary Milling (1890-1982). They had two children: Daphne Lois Macready (better known as the writer Rowena Farre) and Anthony John Lowne Macready.

He died in Folkestone, Kent, in 1957.
