= 1877 Birthday Honours =

Appointments by Queen Victoria to various orders and honours

The 1877 Birthday Honours were appointments by Queen Victoria to various orders and honours to reward and highlight good works by citizens of the British Empire. The appointments were made to celebrate the official birthday of the Queen, and were published in The London Gazette on 30 May and 2 June 1877.

The recipients of honours are displayed here as they were styled before their new honour, and arranged by honour, with classes (Knight, Knight Grand Cross, etc.) and then divisions (Military, Civil, etc.) as appropriate.

== United Kingdom and British Empire ==
=== The Most Honourable Order of the Bath ===
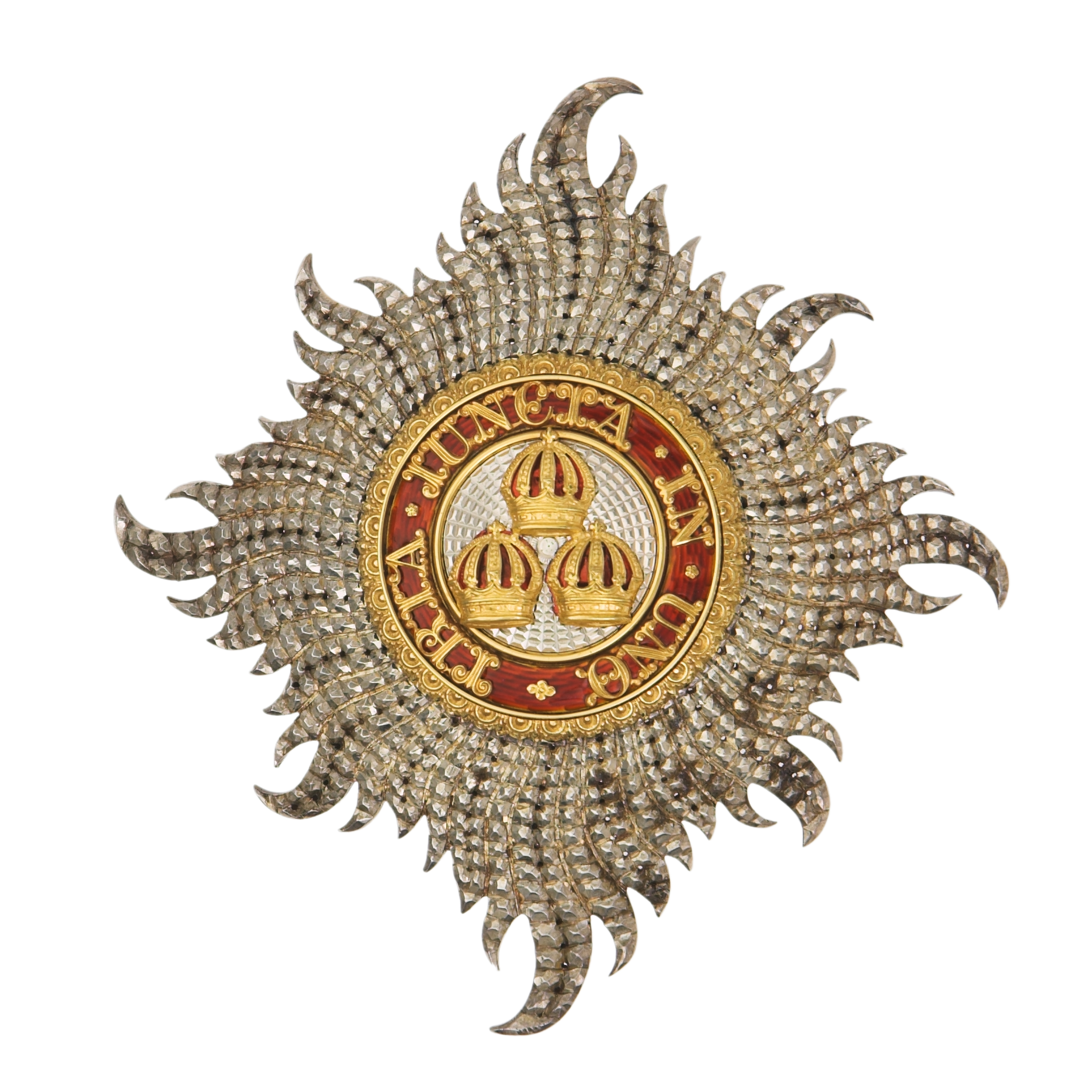
Civilian star of the Knight Grand Cross of the Order of the Bath

==== Knight Grand Cross of the Order of the Bath (GCB) ====
===== Military Division =====
Royal Navy

- Admiral Sir George Rodney Mundy KCB

Army

- General Sir William Wyllie KCB
- Lieutenant-General Sir Frederick Edward Chapman KCB
- Lieutenant-General Sir Frederick Paul Haines KCB
- Lieutenant-General Sir David Edward Wood KCB
- Major-General Sir John Douglas KCB

==== Knight Commander of the Order of the Bath (KCB) ====
===== Military Division =====
Royal Navy

- Admiral George Elliot
- Vice-Admiral Frederick Beauchamp Paget Seymour CB
- Rear-Admiral William Houston Stewart CB

Army

- Lieutenant-General Arthur Borton CB
- Lieutenant-General Richard Waddy CB
- Lieutenant-General Henry Dalrymple White CB
- Major-General William Sherbrooke Ramsay Norcott CB
- Major-General Daniel Lysons CB
- Major-General Charles Lawrence D'Aguilar CB
- Major-General James Talbot Airey CB
- Major-General Alexander Taylor CB
- Major-General Michael Galwey CB
- Major-General George Wade Guy Green CB
- Major-General Thomas Hurdle CB late Royal Marines
- Inspector-General of Hospital and Fleets William Richard Edwin Smart CB

==== Companion of the Order of the Bath (CB) ====
===== Military Division =====
Royal Navy

- Rear-Admiral Richard James, Lord Gilford
- Captain John Bythesea VC
- Captain Arthur Wilmshurst
- Captain William Gore Jones
- Captain George Augustus Cooke Brooker
- Captain William Horton
- Captain Henry William Hire
- Captain Joseph Henry Marryat
- Captain Henry Frederick McKillop
- Captain Hubert Campion
- Captain Edward Hardinge
- Captain William Graham
- Captain Anthony Hiley Hoskins
- Captain Henry Hamilton Beamish

Army

- Lieutenant-General John Hamilton Elphinstone Dalrymple
- Major-General Alfred Huyshe
- Major-General Lord Alexander George Russell
- Major-General Charles John Foster
- Colonel Edward Seager, Inspecting Officer of Auxiliary Cavalry
- Colonel Alexander Cunningham Robertson, Brigade Depot
- Colonel Robert Beaufoy Hawley, late 60th Regiment
- Colonel George Courtney Vialls, Brigade Depot
- Colonel William Charles Robertson Macdonald, Madras Staff Corps
- Colonel George Bridges Rodney, Royal Marines
- Colonel William Frederick, Lord Abinger, Scots Guards
- Colonel James Thomas Walker, Royal (late Bombay) Engineers
- Colonel Octavius Edward Rothney CSI Bengal Staff Corps
- Colonel Campbell Claye Grant Ross, Bengal Staff Corps
- Captain Robert Calder Allen
- Colonel Thomas Casey Lyons, late Brigade Depot
- Colonel Alexander James Hardy Elliot
- Colonel Robert Biddulph, Royal Artillery
- Colonel Charles Cooper Johnson, Bengal Staff Corps
- Colonel Osborn Wilkinson, Bengal Cavalry
- Colonel Frederick Richard Solly-Flood, 82nd Regiment
- Colonel Edward William Bray, 4th Regiment
- Colonel Talbot Ashley Cox, 3rd Regiment
- Colonel Charles Edward Oldershaw, Royal Artillery
- Colonel John Elliott, late Royal Marines
- Lieutenant-Colonel James Bevan Edwards, Royal Engineers
- Lieutenant-Colonel Henry George Delafosse, 101st Regiment
- Lieutenant-Colonel Nevinson Willoughby de Courcy, Royal Marines
- Inspector-General of Hospitals and Fleets William Thomas Domville
- Deputy Commissary-General Arthur William Downes

=== The Most Exalted Order of the Star of India ===
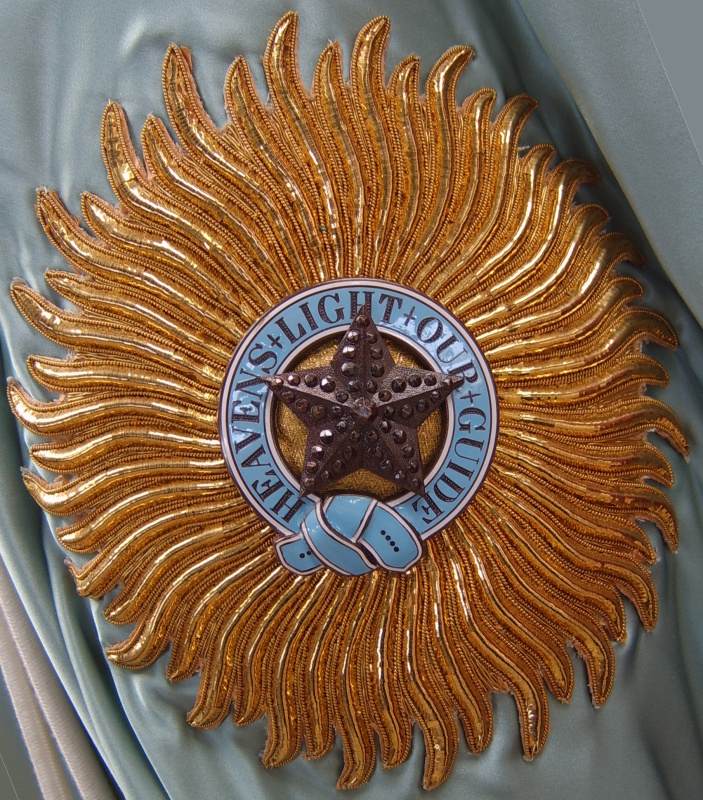
Star of a Knight Grand Commander of the Most Exalted Order of the Star of India

==== Knight Grand Commander (GCSI) ====
- Field-Marshal His Royal Highness George William Frederick Charles, Duke of Cambridge KG GCB KP GCMG

==== Knight Commander (KCSI) ====
- Joseph Dalton Hooker CB Director of the Royal Botanical Gardens at Kew
- Thomas Lawrence Seccombe CB Financial Secretary to the Secretary of State for India in Council

==== Companion (CSI) ====
- Colonel George Cliffe Hatch, Bengal Staff Corps Judge Advocate-General, Bengal Army
- Lieutenant-Colonel William George Davies, Bengal Staff Corps, Commissioner, Delhi

=== The Most Distinguished Order of Saint Michael and Saint George ===
Star of the Order of Saint Michael and Saint George

==== Knight Grand Cross of the Order of St Michael and St George (GCMG) ====
- Field-Marshal His Royal Highness George William Frederick Charles, Duke of Cambridge KG GCMG Commanding-in-Chief the Forces, to be Grand Master and First or Principal Knight Grand Cross of the said Most Distinguished Order
- Field-Marshal His Royal Highness Albert Edward, Prince of Wales KG
- The Most Honourable the Marquess of Normanby KCMG Governor of the Colony of New Zealand

==== Knight Commander of the Order of St Michael and St George (KCMG) ====
- Major-General Sir Harry Saint George Ord Kt CB Royal Engineers, lately Governor of the Straits Settlements
- Sir Redmond Barry Kt Senior Puisne Judge of the Supreme Court of the Colony of Victoria
- Sir Henry Watson Parker Kt formerly First Minister of the Colony of New South Wales
- John Bayley Darvall CMG formerly Attorney-General of the Colony of New South Wales
- Stephen Walcott CMG Her Majesty's Commissioner for Emigration
- William Cleaver Francis Robinson CMG Governor of the Colony of Western Australia
- Major Robert Miller Mundy CMG lately Lieutenant-Governor of the Colony of British Honduras
- Major-General Patrick Leonard MacDougall, Deputy Quartermaster-General, formerly Adjutant-General of the Militia of the Dominion of Canada
- Major-General John Henry Lefroy RA CB lately Governor of the Bermuda Islands
- Major-General Edward Selby Smyth, Commanding the Militia of the Dominion of Canada
- Brigadier-General Robert Michael Laffan, Royal Engineers, Governor of the Bermuda Islands
- John Robertson, lately First Minister of the Colony of New South Wales
- Henry Parkes, First Minister of the Colony of New South Wales
- Arthur Blyth, lately First Minister of the Colony of South Australia
- Sir Henry Thurstan Holland Bt CMG MP late Assistant Under-Secretary of State for the Colonies
- William Wellington Cairns CMG Governor of the Colony of South Australia
- Lieutenant-Colonel Henry Berkeley Fitzhardinge Maxse CMG Governor of the Island of Heligoland
- William Fitzherbert CMG formerly Colonial Treasurer and Member of the Executive Government and Executive Council of New Zealand, and Special Agent for that Colony

==== Companion of the Order of St Michael and St George (CMG) ====
- J. Thomas Fitzgerald Callaghan, Governor of the Falkland Islands
- William Robinson, Governor of the Bahama Islands
- Hudson Ralph Janisch, Governor of the Island of Saint Helena
- George Dundas, Lieutenant-Governor of the Island of Saint Vincent
- George William Des Vœux, Administrator of the Government of the Island of Saint Lucia
- Frederick Palgrave Barlee, Lieutenant-Governor of the Colony of British Honduras
- Joseph Trutch, lately Lieutenant-Governor of the Province of British Columbia
- Cyril Clerke Graham, Lieutenant-Governor of the Island of Grenada
- John Douglas, First Minister of the Colony of Queensland
- Edwin Donald Baynes, Colonial Secretary for the Leeward Islands
- John Scott Bushe, Colonial Secretary for the Island of Trinidad
- William Alexander George Young, Government Secretary for the Colony of British Guiana
- Gustave Barthélémy Colin, lately Procureur and Advocate-General of the Island of Mauritius
- Frederick Napier Broome, Colonial Secretary for the Colony of Natal
- Alexander Wilson Moir, President of the Island of Saint Christopher
- John d'Auvergne Dumaresq, Colonial Secretary for the Gold Coast Colony
- George Vane, Treasurer of the Island of Ceylon
- Thomas Russell, formerly Defence Minister of the Colony of New Zealand
- James Henry Keens, formerly President of the Privy Council of the Island of Tobago
- John Smith, President of the Council of Education for the Colony of New South Wales
- Alexander Murray, Director of the Geological Survey of the Island of Newfoundland
- Sandford Fleming, Royal Engineers, Engineer-in-Chief of the Canadian Pacific Railway
- John Palliser, lately in Command of an Expedition sent by the Government of Canada to the Rocky Mountains
- Major Donald R. Cameron RA lately Chief Officer of the British Boundary Commission, Canada
- Captain Samuel Anderson, Royal Engineers, lately Chief Astronomer of the British Boundary Commission, Canada
- Captain George Arthur French RA formerly Commissioner of the North-West Police, Canada
- Donald Currie
- Captain Louis Frederick Knollys, late of Her Majesty's 32nd Regiment of Foot, lately Commanding Armed Constabulary in the Colony of Fiji
- Arthur J. L. Gordon, Private Secretary to the Governor of the Colony of Fiji
- Cornelius Hendricksen Kortright, Governor of the Colony of British Guiana
- Lieutenant-Colonel William Grossman, R.E., lately Her Majesty's Commissioner of Enquiry into the Financial Affairs of the Province of Griqua Land West
- Henry Lushington Phillips, Puisne Judge of the Supreme Court of the Colony of Natal, and lately Acting Chief Justice for the Island of Barbados
- Colonel Antonio Mattel, R.M.F.A., for many years Lieutenant-Colonel in Command of the Royal Malta Fencible Artillery
