= Campbell Claye Grant Ross =

Scottish Indian Army general

Sir Campbell Claye Grant Ross KCB
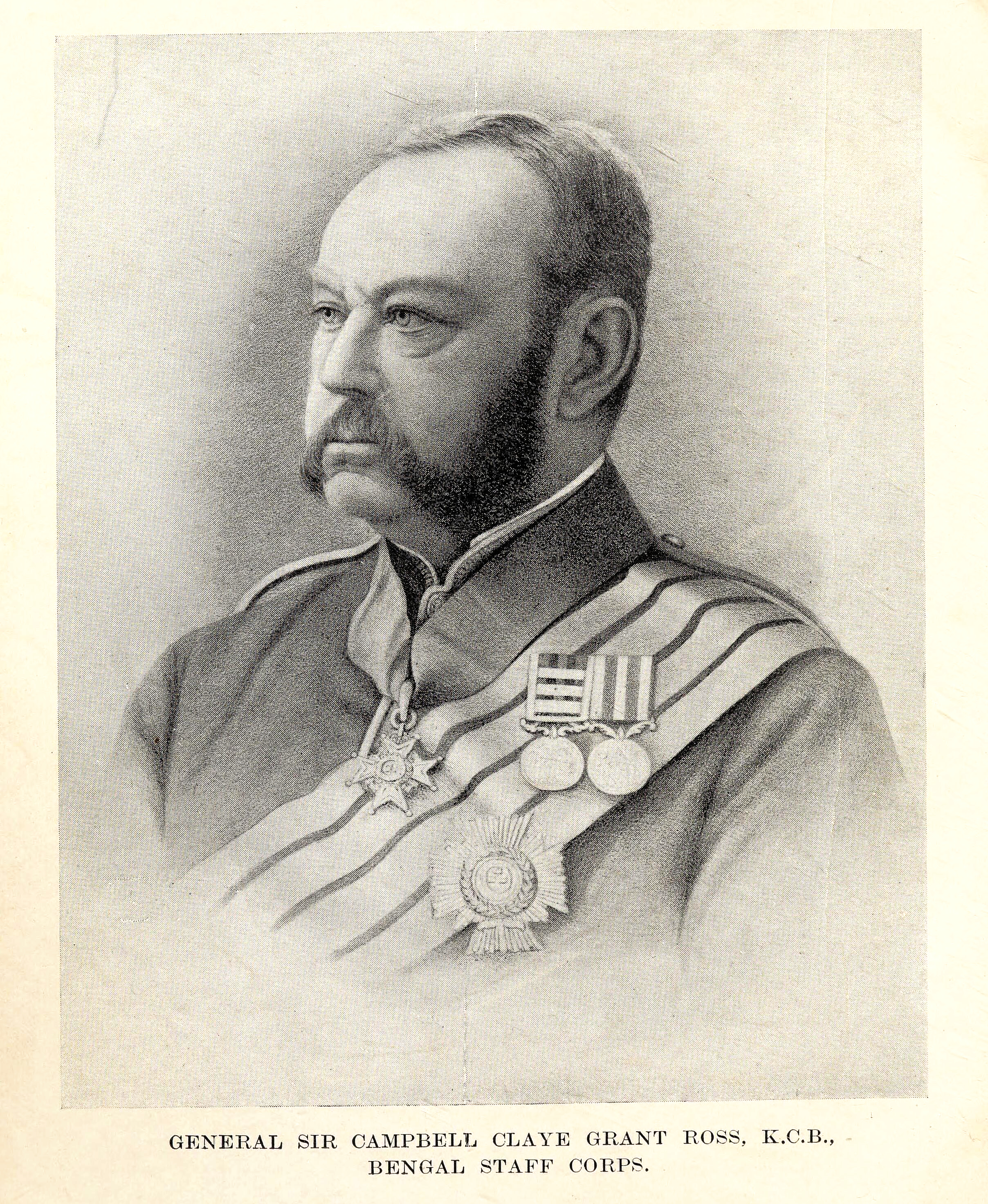
- Born: 18 May 1824; Saugor, Saugor and Nerbudda Territories, British India
- Died: 20 June 1892 (aged 68); Eastbourne, Sussex, England
- Burial place: Ocklynge Cemetery
- Spouse: Matilda Elderton
- Children: 10, including Ronald Ross and Charles Ross
- Military career
- Allegiance: British
- Branch: Army
- Rank: General
- Unit: Bengal Staff Corps
- Conflicts: Jowaki Expedition
- Awards: Companion of the Order of the Bath

General Sir Campbell Claye Grant Ross KCB (18 May 1824 – 20 June 1892) was a Scottish officer in the British Indian Army. He fought in the Jowaki Expedition.

Ross was born in Saugor, British India, the second son of Lt Col Hugh Ross and Eliza Watson. He was descended from the chiefs of Clan Ross.

He was made a Companion of the Order of the Bath in the 1877 Birthday Honours, at which time he was in the Bengal Staff Corps, and later rose to Knight Commander of that order in 1880.

In 1856, he married Matilda Elderton, daughter of Edward Merrick Elderton. They had 10 children, the eldest of whom was the physician Sir Ronald Ross, winner of the Nobel Prize for medicine. Sir Ronald's grandson David Campbell Ross (born 1934) was named Chief of Clan Ross in 1999.

He died in Eastbourne, aged 68, and was buried at Ocklynge Cemetery.
