= Ronald Ross =

British Indian medical doctor and Nobel laureate (1857–1932)

Sir Ronald Ross KCB KCMG FRS FRCS
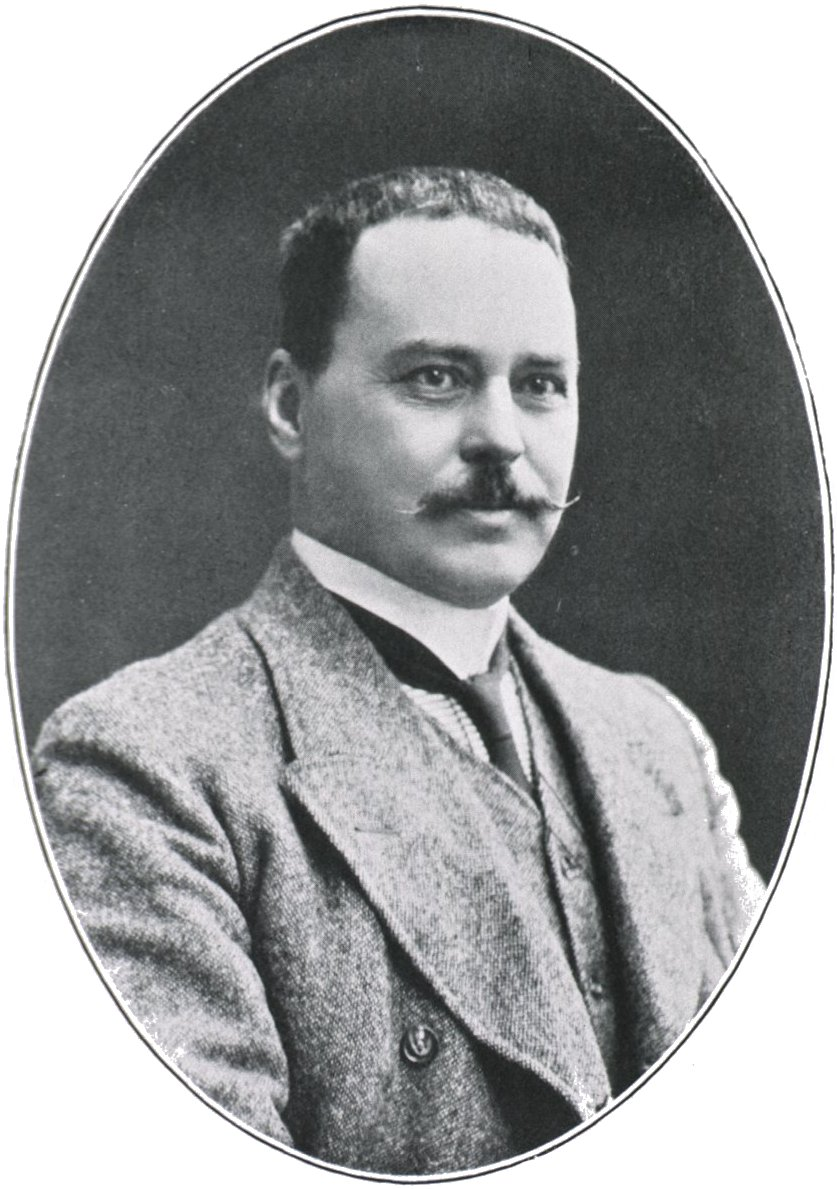
- Born: 13 May 1857; Almora, North-Western Provinces, British India
- Died: 16 September 1932 (aged 75); London, United Kingdom
- Resting place: Putney Vale Cemetery; 51.438408°N 0.239821°W
- Education: St Bartholomew's Hospital Medical College
- Known for: Discovering that the malaria parasite is transmitted by mosquitoes
- Spouse: Rosa Bessie Bloxam (m. 1889)
- Awards: Cameron Prize for Therapeutics of the University of Edinburgh (1901); FRS (1901); Nobel Prize in Physiology or Medicine (1902); Albert Medal (1923); Manson Medal (1929)
- Scientific career
- Fields: Medicine
- Workplaces: Presidency General Hospital, Calcutta; Liverpool School of Tropical Medicine; King's College Hospital; British War Office; Ministry of Pensions and National Insurance; Ross Institute and Hospital for Tropical Diseases
- Author abbrev. (zoology): Ross

Sir Ronald Ross KCB KCMG FRS FRCS (13 May 1857 – 16 September 1932) was a British medical doctor. He received the 1902 Nobel Prize for Physiology or Medicine "for his work on malaria, by which he has shown how it enters the organism and thereby has laid the foundation for successful research on this disease and methods of combating it". His discovery of the malarial parasite in the gastrointestinal tract of a mosquito in 1897 proved that malaria was transmitted by mosquitoes, and laid the foundation for the method of combating the disease.

Ross was a polymath, writing a number of poems, publishing several novels, and composing songs. He was also an amateur artist and mathematician. He worked in the Indian Medical Service for 25 years. It was during his service that he made the groundbreaking medical discovery. After resigning from his service in India, he joined the faculty of Liverpool School of Tropical Medicine, and continued as Professor and Chairman of Tropical Medicine of the institute for 10 years. In 1926, he became Director-in-Chief of the Ross Institute and Hospital for Tropical Diseases, which was established in honour of his works. He remained there until his death.

== Early life and education ==
Ross was born in Almora, then in the North-Western Provinces of Company-ruled India, north west of Nepal. He was the eldest of ten children of Sir Campbell Claye Grant Ross, a general in the British Indian Army, and Matilda Charlotte Elderton. At age eight, he was sent to England to live with his aunt and uncle on the Isle of Wight. He attended Primary schools at Ryde, and for secondary education he was sent to a boarding school at Springhill, near Southampton, in 1869. From his early childhood, he developed a passion for poetry, music, literature and mathematics. At fourteen years of age he won a prize for mathematics, a book titled Orbs of Heaven which sparked his interest in mathematics. In 1873, at sixteen, he secured first position in the Oxford and Cambridge local examination in drawing.

Although Ross wanted to become a writer, his father arranged enrollment at St Bartholomew's Hospital Medical College in London, in 1874. Not fully committed, he spent most of his time composing music, and writing poems and plays. He left in 1880. In 1879 he had passed the examinations for the Royal College of Surgeons of England, and he worked as a ship's surgeon on a transatlantic steamship while studying for the licenciate of the Society of Apothecaries. He qualified on second attempt in 1881, and after a four-month training at Army Medical School, was appointed a surgeon in the Indian Medical Service on 5 April 1881, assigned to the Madras Presidency. Between June 1888 and May 1889 he took study leave to obtain the diploma in public health from the Royal College of Physicians and Royal College of Surgeons, and took a course in bacteriology under Professor E. E. Klein.

== Career ==
=== India ===
Ross embarked for India on 22 September 1881 on the troopship Jumma. Between 1881 and 1894 he was variously posted in Madras, Moulmein (in Burma/Myanmar), Baluchistan, Andaman Islands, Bangalore and Secunderabad. In 1883, he was posted as the Acting Garrison Surgeon at Bangalore during which he noticed the possibility of controlling mosquitoes by limiting their access to water. In March 1894 he had his home leave and went to London with his family. On 10 April 1894 he met Sir Patrick Manson for the first time. Manson who became Ross's mentor, introduced him to the real problems in malaria research. Manson always had a firm belief that India was the best place for the study. Ross returned to India on P&O ship Ballaarat on 20 March 1895 and landed in Secunderabad on 24 April. Even before his luggage was cleared in the custom office, he went straight for Bombay Civil Hospital, looking for malarial patients and started making blood films.

==== Discovery of malaria-causing mosquito ====
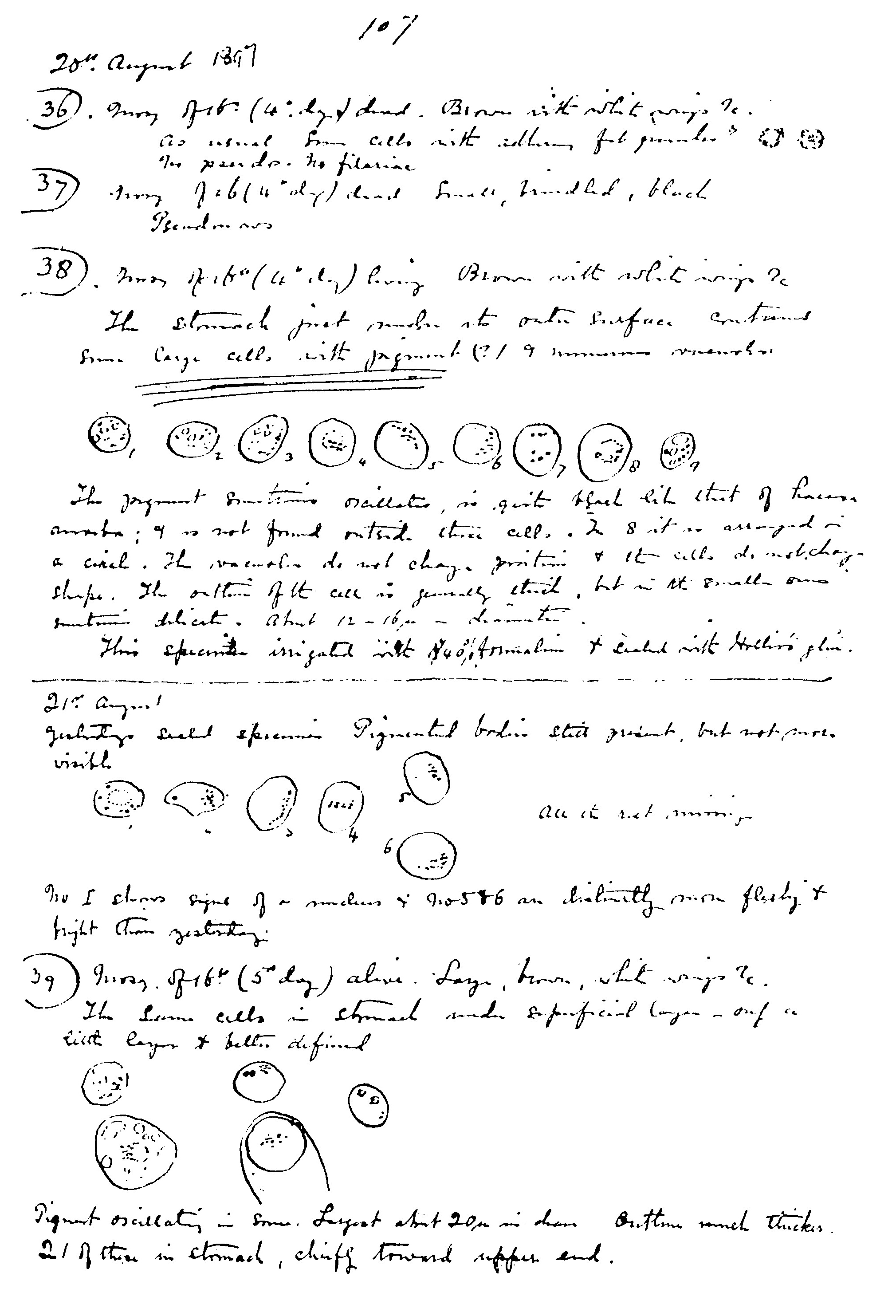
The page in Ross' notebook where he recorded the "pigmented bodies" in mosquitoes that he later identified as malaria parasites

Ross made his first important step in May 1895 when he observed the early stages of malarial parasite inside a mosquito stomach. However, his enthusiasm was interrupted as he was deployed to Bangalore to investigate an outbreak of cholera. Bangalore had no regular cases of malaria. He confided to Manson stating, "I am thrown out of employment and have 'no work to do'." But in April he had a chance to visit Sigur Ghat near the hill station of Ooty, where he noticed a mosquito on the wall in a peculiar posture, and for this he called it "dappled-winged" mosquito, not knowing the species. In May 1896, he was given a short leave that enabled him to visit a malaria-endemic region around Ooty. In spite of his daily quinine prophylaxis, he was down with severe malaria three days after his arrival. In June he was transferred to Secunderabad.

After two years of research failure, in July 1897, Ross managed to culture 20 adult "brown" mosquitoes from collected larvae. He successfully infected the mosquitoes from a patient named Husein Khan for a price of 8 annas (one anna per blood-fed mosquito). After blood-feeding, he dissected the mosquitoes. On 20 August he confirmed the presence of the malarial parasite inside the gut of mosquito, which he originally identified as "dappled-wings" (which turned out to be a species of the genus Anopheles). The next day, on 21 August, he confirmed the growth of the parasite in the mosquito. This discovery was published on 27 August 1897 in the Indian Medical Gazette and subsequently in the December 1897 issue of British Medical Journal. In the evening he composed the following poem for his discovery (originally unfinished, sent to his wife on 22 August, and completed a few days later):

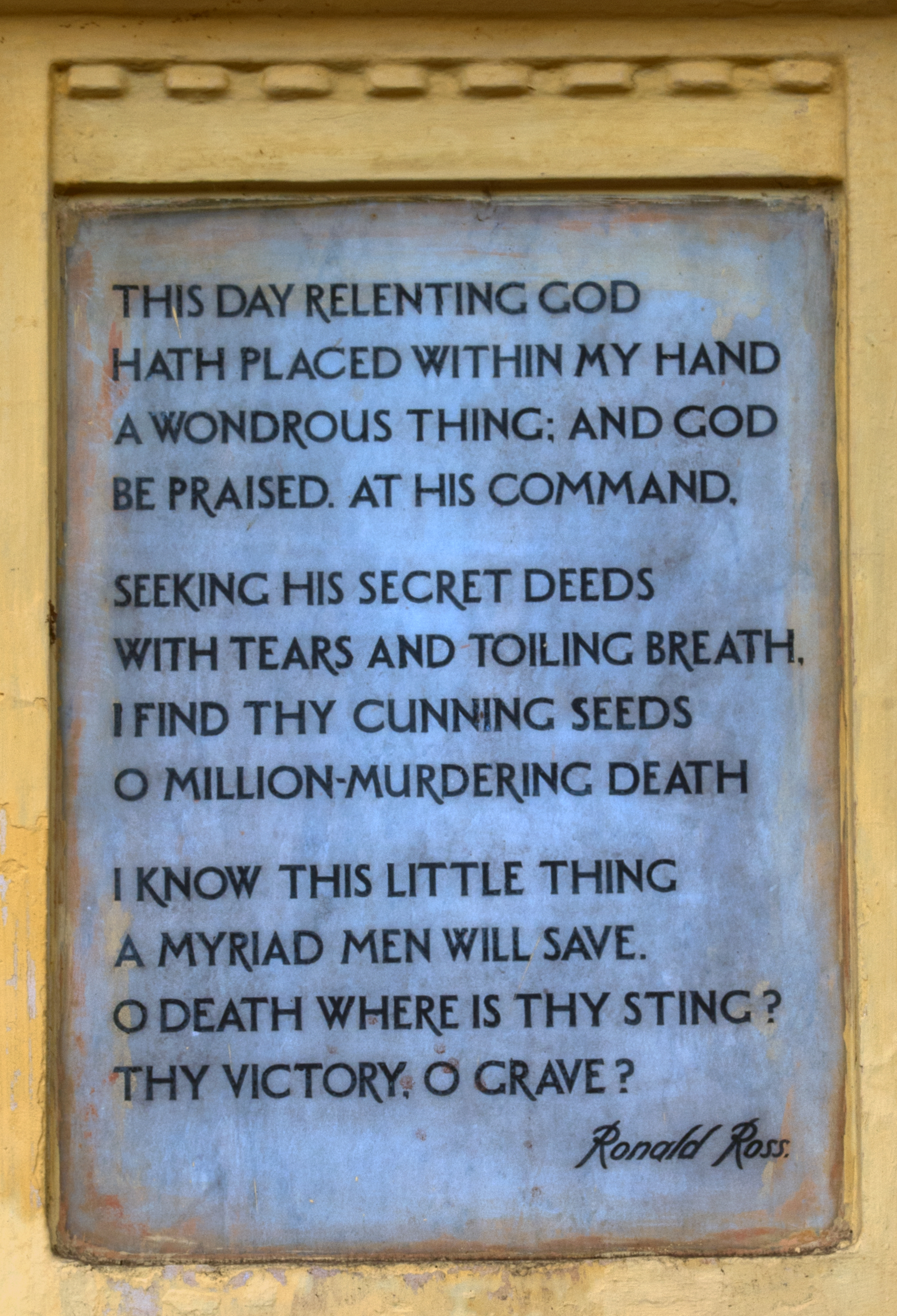
Plaque from the Ronald Ross Memorial, Kolkata

This day relenting God
Hath placed within my hand
A wondrous thing; and God
Be praised. At His command,
Seeking His secret deeds
With tears and toiling breath,
I find thy cunning seeds,
O million-murdering Death.
I know this little thing
A myriad men will save.
O Death, where is thy sting?
Thy victory, O Grave?

==== Discovery of malaria transmission in birds ====
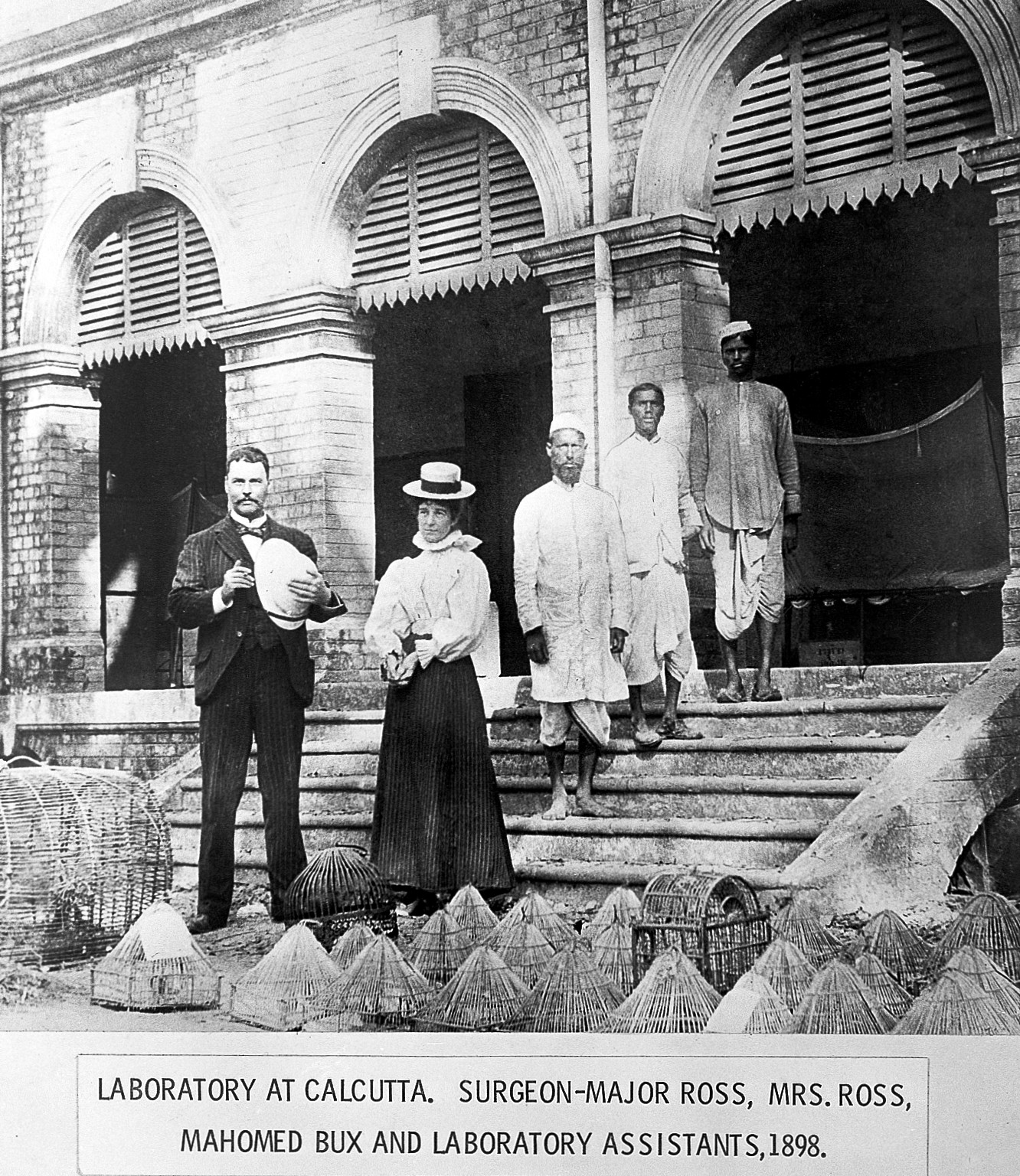
Ross, Mrs Ross, Mahomed Bux, and two other assistants at Cunningham's laboratory of Presidency Hospital in Calcutta

In September 1897, Ross was transferred to Bombay, from where he was subsequently sent to malaria-free Kherwara in Rajputana (now Rajasthan). Frustrated by lack of work, he threatened to resign from the service as he felt that it was a death blow to his research. It was only on the representation of Patrick Manson that the government arranged for his continued service in Calcutta on "special duty". On 17 February 1898, he arrived in Calcutta (now Kolkata), to work in the Presidency General Hospital (now IPGMER and SSKM Hospital).

Ross immediately carried out research in malaria and Visceral leishmaniasis (also known as kala azar), for which he was assigned. He was given the use of Surgeon-Lieutenant-General Cunningham's laboratory for his research. He had no success with malarial patients because they were always immediately given medication. He built a bungalow with a laboratory at Mahanad village, where he would stay from time to time to collect mosquitoes in and around the village. He employed Mahomed (or Muhammed) Bux and Purboona (who deserted him after the first payday). As Calcutta was not a malarious place, Manson persuaded him to use birds, as being used by other scientists such as Vasily Danilewsky in Russia and William George MacCallum in America. Ross complied but with a complaint that he "did not need to be in India to study bird malaria". By March he began to see results on bird parasites, very closely related to the human malarial parasites.

Using more convenient model of birds (infected sparrows), by July 1898 Ross established the importance of culex mosquitoes as intermediate hosts in avian malaria. On 4 July he discovered that the salivary gland was the storage sites of malarial parasites in the mosquito. By 8 July he was convinced that the parasites are released from the salivary gland during biting. He later demonstrated the transmission of malarial parasite from mosquitoes (in this case Culex species) to healthy sparrows from an infected one, thus, establishing the complete life cycle of malarial parasite.

In September 1898 he went to southern Assam in (northeast India) to study an epidemic of Visceral leishmaniasis. He was invited to work there by Graham Col Ville Ramsay, the second Medical Officer of the Labac Tea Estate Hospital. (His microscope and medicals tools are still preserved, and his sketches of mosquitoes are still on display at the hospital.) However, he utterly failed as he believed that the kala-azar parasite (Leishmania donovani, the very scientific name he later gave in 1903) was transmitted by a mosquito, which he refers to as Anopheles rossi (scientific name given by G.M. Giles). (It is now known that kala azar is transmitted by sandflies.)

=== England ===
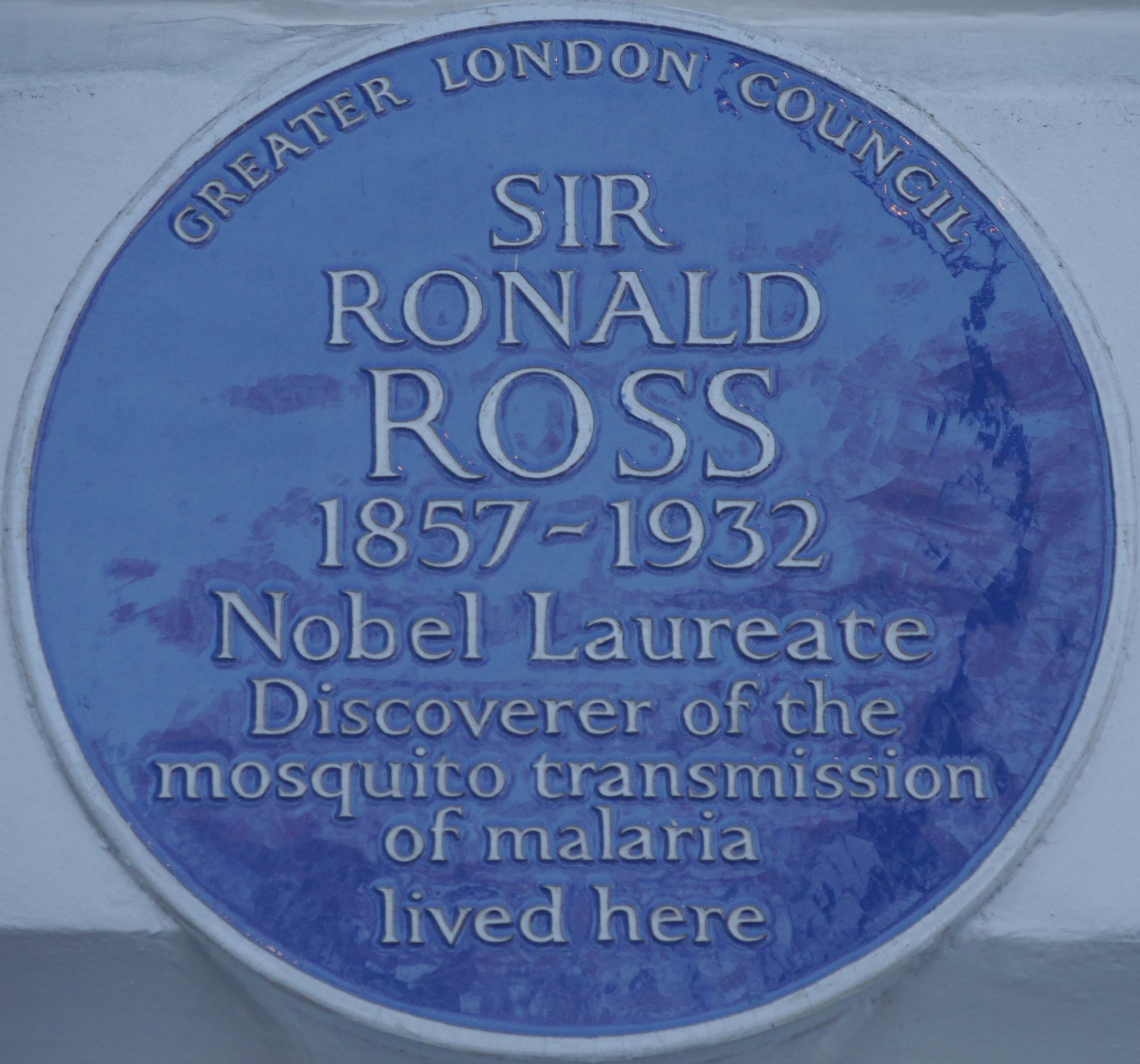
Blue plaque, 18 Cavendish Square, London

In 1899, Ross resigned from the Indian Medical Service and went to England to join the faculty of the Liverpool School of Tropical Medicine as a lecturer. He continued to work on prevention of malaria in different parts of the world, including West Africa, the Suez Canal zone, Greece, Mauritius, Cyprus, and in the areas affected by the First World War. He also established organisations for fighting malaria in India and Sri Lanka. In 1902, Ross was awarded the Cameron Prize for Therapeutics of the University of Edinburgh. He was appointed as Professor and Chair of Tropical Medicine of the Liverpool School of Tropical Medicine in 1902, which he held up to 1912. In 1912 he was appointed Physician for Tropical Diseases at King's College Hospital in London, and simultaneously hold the Chair of Tropical Sanitation in Liverpool. He remained in these posts until 1917 when he became (honorary) Consultant in Malariology in British War Office. He travelled to Thessaloniki and Italy in November to advise and on the way, "in a landlocked bay close to the Leucadian Rock (where Sappho is supposed to have drowned herself)", his ship escaped a torpedo attack. Between 1918 and 1926 he worked as Consultant in Malaria in the Ministry of Pensions and National Insurance.

Ross developed mathematical models for the study of malaria epidemiology, which he initiated in his report on Mauritius in 1908. He elaborated the concept in his book The Prevention of Malaria in 1910 (2nd edition in 1911) and further elaborated in a more generalised form in scientific papers published by the Royal Society in 1915 and 1916; some of his epidemiology work was developed with mathematician Hilda Hudson. These papers represented a profound mathematical interest which was not confined to epidemiology, but led him to make material contributions to both pure and applied mathematics.

Ross was one of the supporters of Sir William Osler in the founding of the History of Medicine Society in 1912, and in 1913 was the history of medicine section's vice-president. Between 1913 and 1917, he received some financial support from Sir Edwin Durning-Lawrence, and led experiments at the Marcus Beck laboratory in the Royal Society of Medicine building at 1 Wimpole Street, London.

==== Ross Institute and Hospital for Tropical Diseases ====
The Ross Institute and Hospital for Tropical Diseases was founded in 1926 and established at Bath House, a grand house with keeper's lodge and large grounds adjacent to Tibbet's Corner at Putney Heath. The hospital was opened by the then Prince of Wales, the future King Edward VIII. Ross assumed the post of Director-in-Chief until his death. The institute was later incorporated into the London School of Hygiene & Tropical Medicine in Keppel Street. Bath House was later demolished and mansion flats built on the property. In memory of its history and owner the block was named Ross Court. Within the grounds an older dwelling, Ross Cottage, remains.

== Nobel Prize ==
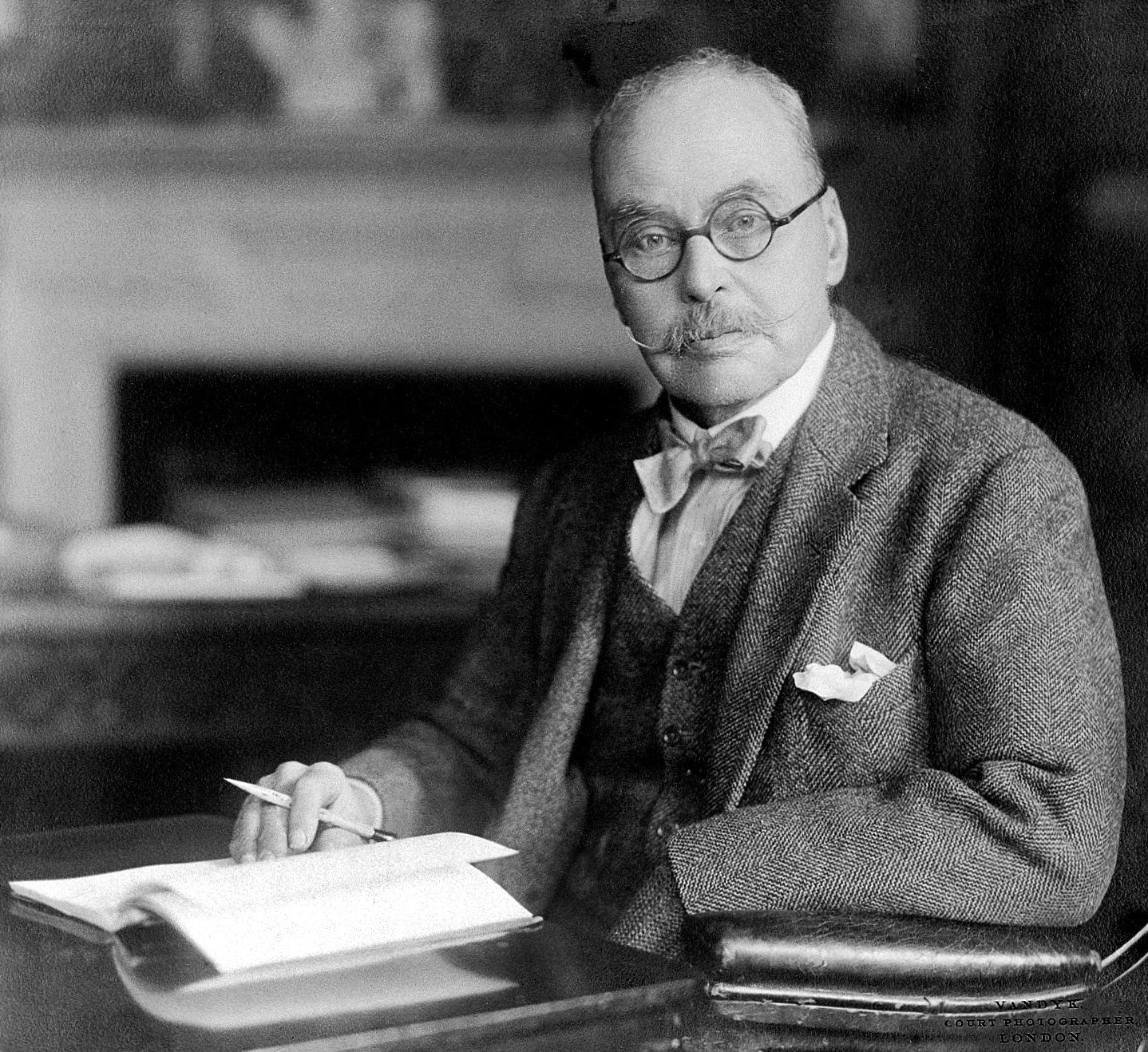
Ronald Ross

Ronald Ross was awarded a Nobel Prize for his discovery of the life cycle of the malarial parasite in birds. He did not build his concept of malarial transmission in humans, but in birds. Ross was the first to show that malarial parasite was transmitted by the bite of infected mosquitoes, in his case the avian Plasmodium relictum. In 1897, an Italian physician and zoologist Giovanni Battista Grassi, along with his colleagues, had established the developmental stages of malaria parasites in anopheline mosquitoes; and they described the complete life cycles of P. falciparum, P. vivax and P. malariae the following year.

When the 1902 Nobel Prize for Physiology or Medicine was considered, the Nobel Committee initially intended the prize to be shared between Ross and Grassi, however Ross accused Grassi of deliberate fraud. The weight of favour ultimately fell on Ross, largely due to the influences of Robert Koch, the appointed neutral arbitrator in the committee; as reported, "Koch threw the full weight of his considerable authority in insisting that Grassi did not deserve the honor".

== Personal life and death ==
Ronald Ross was noted to be eccentric and egocentric, described as an "impulsive man" or an "impulsive genius." His professional life appeared to be in constant feud with his students, colleagues, and fellow scientists. His personal vendetta with G. B. Grassi became a legendary tale in science. He was openly envious of his mentor Patrick Manson's affluence from private practices. His Memories of Sir Patrick Manson (1930) was a direct attempt to belittle Manson's influences on his works on malaria. He hardly had good ties with the administration of Liverpool School of Tropical Medicine, complaining of being underpaid. He resigned twice, and was eventually discharged without any pension.

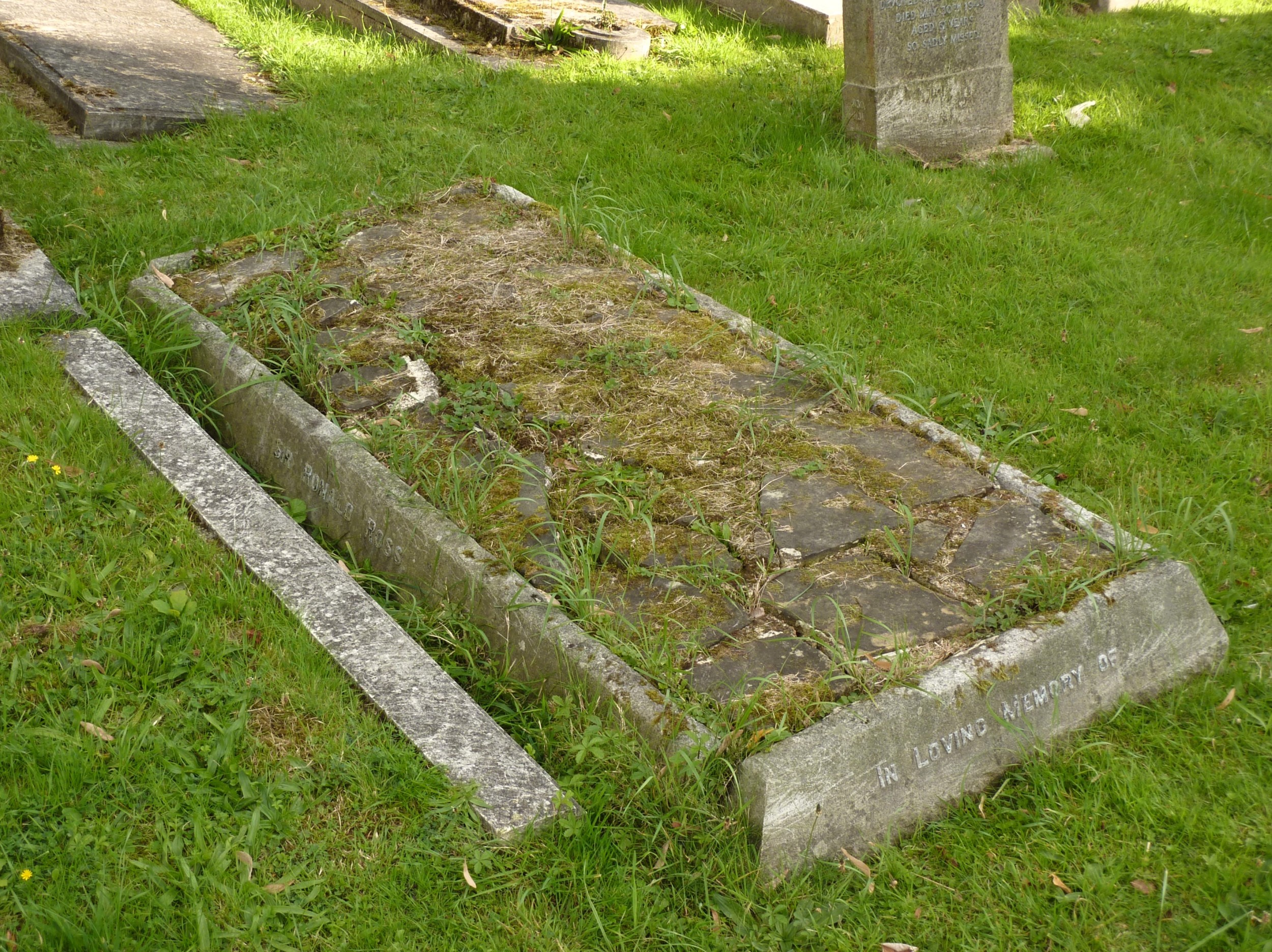
Ross's grave at Putney Vale Cemetery, London in 2014

Ross was frequently embittered by lack of government support (what he called "administrative barbarism") for scientists in medical research. In 1928 he advertised his papers for sale in the journal Science Progress in the Twentieth Century (1919–1933), with a statement that the money was for financial support of his wife and family. Lady Houston bought them for £2000, and offered them to the British Museum, which turned her down for various reasons. The papers are now preserved by the London School of Hygiene and Tropical Medicine and the Royal College of Physicians and Surgeons of Glasgow.

In 1889 Ross married Rosa Bessie Bloxam (d.1931). They had two daughters, Dorothy (1891–1947) and Sylvia (1893–1925), and two sons, Ronald Campbell (1895–1914) and Charles Claye (1901–1966). His wife died in 1931. Ronald and Sylvia pre-deceased him too: Ronald was killed at the Battle of Le Cateau on 26 August 1914. Ross died at the hospital of his namesake after a long illness and asthma attack. He was buried at the nearby Putney Vale Cemetery, next to his wife.

== Legacy ==
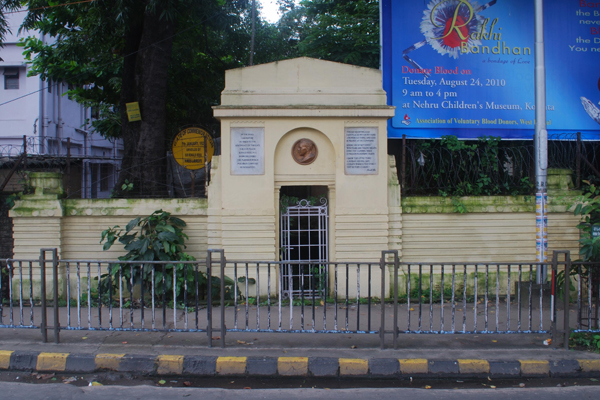
Ronald Ross Memorial, SSKM Hospital, Kolkata

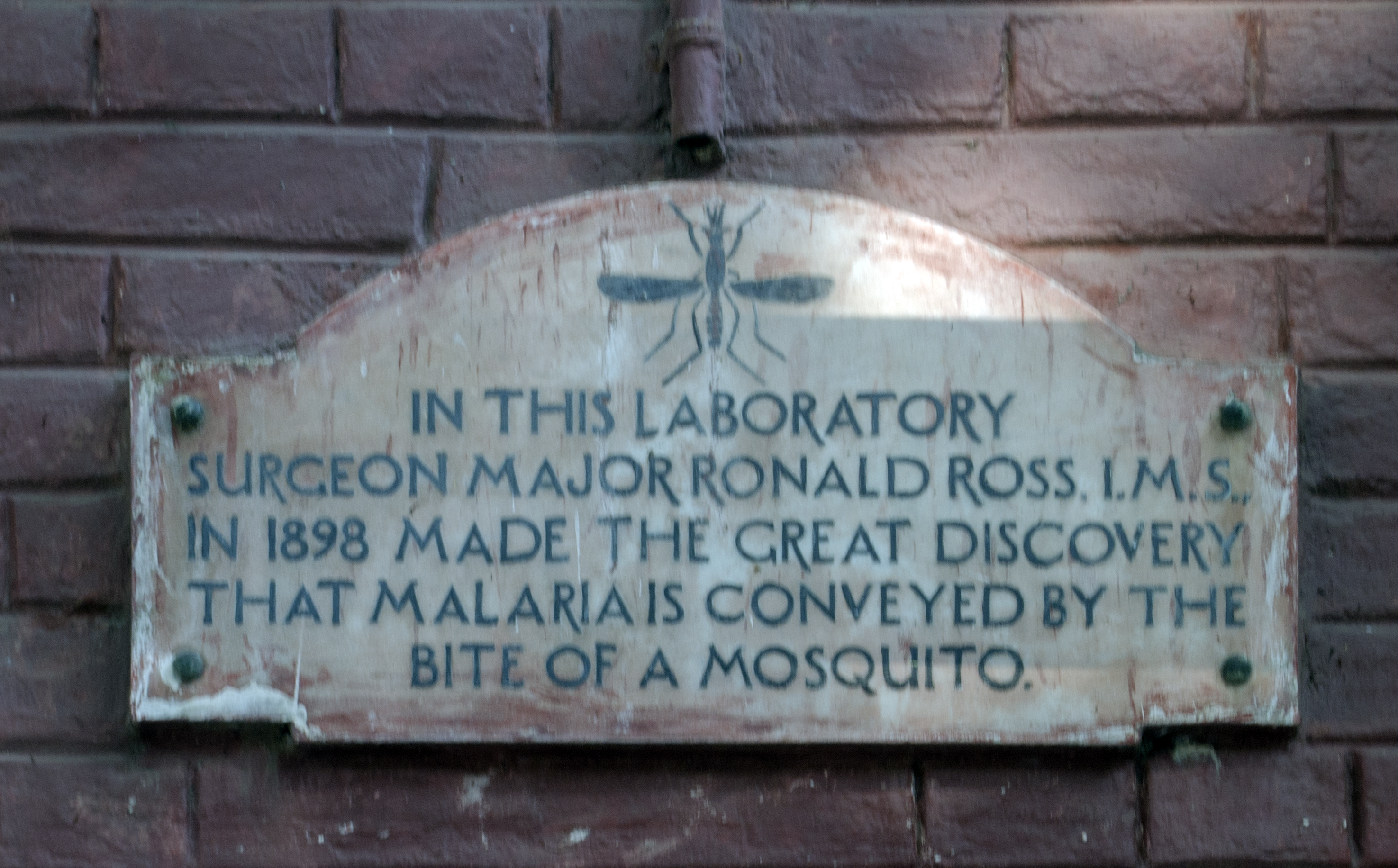
Ronald Ross Plaque at PG Hospital

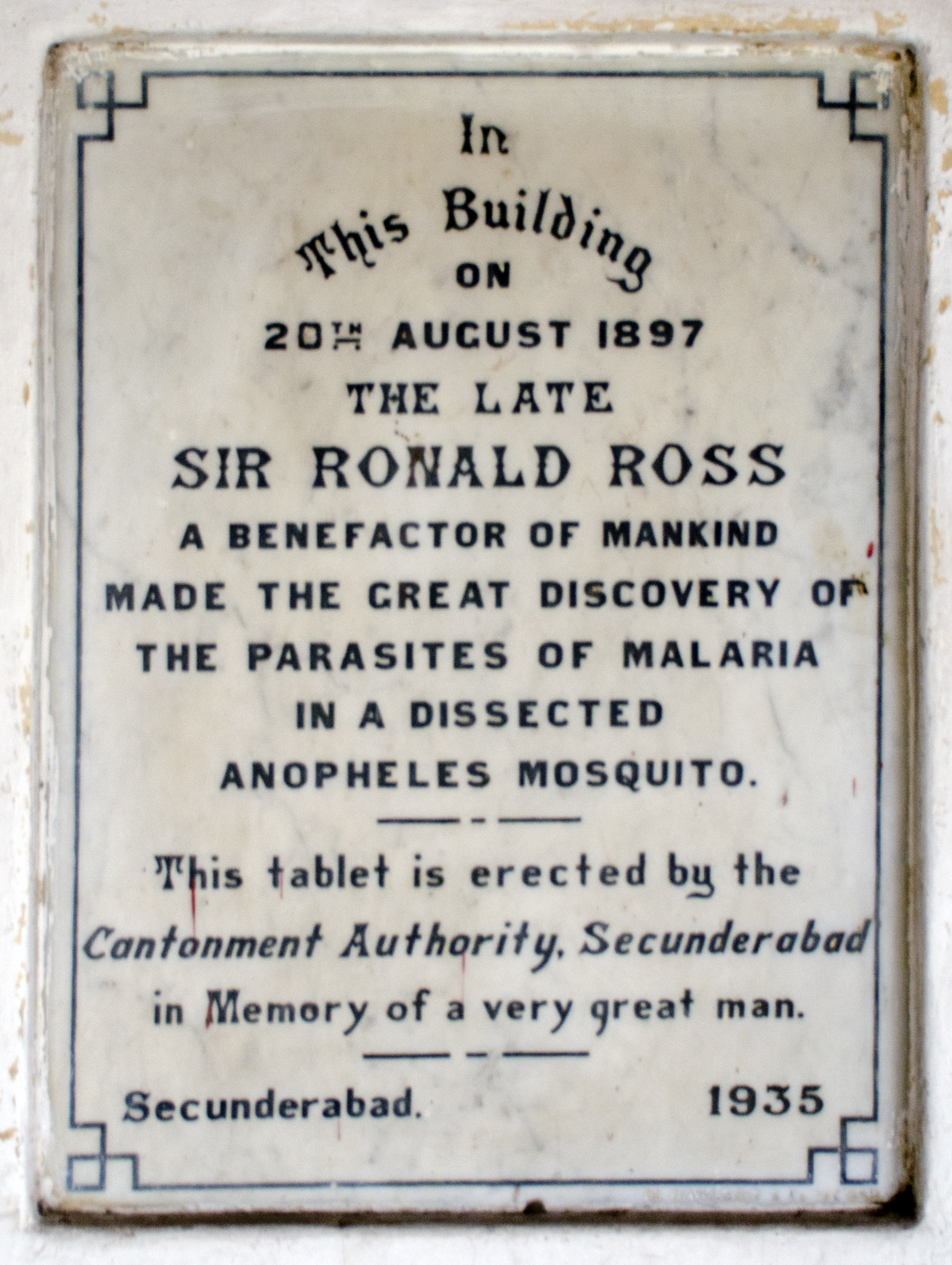
Plaque of the discovery of transmission of Malaria at Sir Ronald Ross Institute of Parasitology

A small memorial on the walls of SSKM Hospital, Calcutta commemorates Ross's discovery. The memorial was unveiled by Ross himself, in the presence of Lord Lytton, on 7 January 1927. The laboratory where Ross worked has been transferred into a malaria clinic named after him. There is also a plaque on the outer wall.

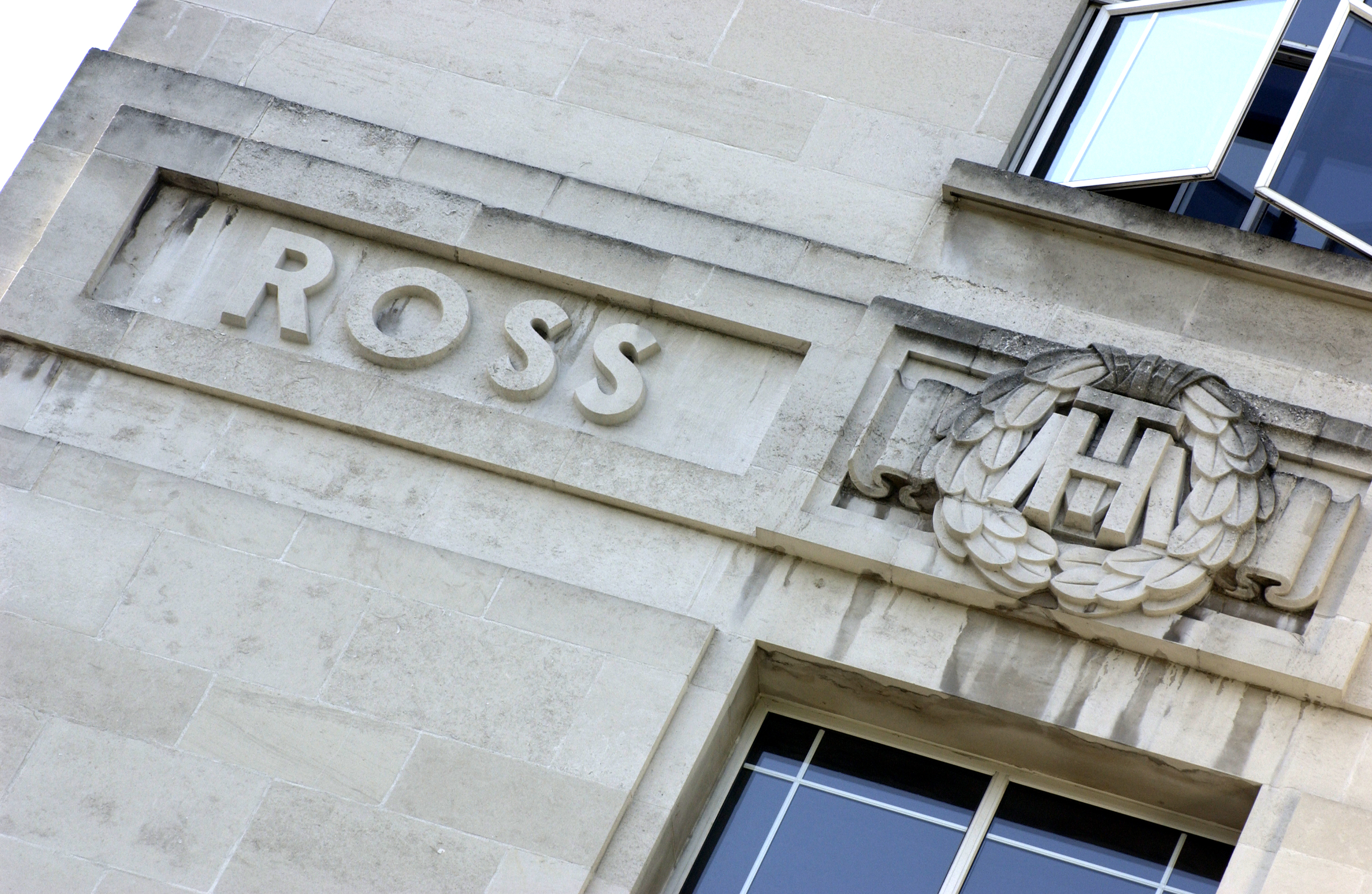
Sir Ronald Ross's name on LSHTM

Sir Ronald Ross is one of 23 names to feature on the frieze of London School of Hygiene & Tropical Medicine, pioneers chosen for their contributions to public health.

A novel, The Calcutta Chromosome by Amitav Ghosh, published in 1995 is based on the life of Ross in Calcutta.

Sir Ronald Ross Institute of Parasitology is the building in Begumpet where Ross made the discovery that malaria was transmitted by the female anopheles mosquito on 20 August. 20 August later came to known as the World Mosquito Day. The lab has been transformed into a small museum exhibiting photos of Ross and his family. Various charts and diagrams explain Ross' work on malaria and its transmission.

== Books ==
- Report on Cholera, General Sanitation, and the Sanitary Department and Regulations, in the C. & M. Station of Bangalore (1896)
- Report on the Cultivation of Proteosoma Labbé, in Grey Mosquitoes (1898). Digitised version available from National Library of Scotland.
- Report on the Nature of Kala-azar (1899). Digitised version available from National Library of Scotland.
- Malarial Fever: Its Cause, Prevention and Treatment; Containing Full Details for the Use of Travellers, Sportsmen, Soldiers, and Residents in Malarious Places (1902)
- First Progress Report of the Campaign Against Mosquitoes in Sierra Leone (with Charles Wilberforce Daniels) (1902)
- Notes on the Parasites of Mosquitoes Found in India Between 1895 and 1899
- Hygiene for Indian Scholars
- Note on the Bodies Recently Described by Leishman and Donovan (1903)
- Further Notes on Leishman's Bodies (1903)
- Report on Malaria at Ismailia and Suez (1903)
- Leishmania Donovani Found in Kala-azar (1904)
- Researches on Malaria (1905)
- Note on a Flagellate Parasite Found in Culex Fatigans (1906)
- Malaria in Greece (1909)
- Missionaries and the Campaign Against Malaria (1910)
- A Case of Sleeping Sickness Studied by Precise Enumerative Methods: Regular Periodical Increase of the Parasites Disclosed (with David Thomson) (1910)
- Discussion on the Treatment of Malaria (1918)
- Mosquitoes and Malaria in Britain (1918)
- Suggestions for the Care of Malaria Patients (1919)
- Observations on malaria (1919)
- Memoirs, with a Full Account of the Great Malaria Problem and Its Solution (1923)
- Malaria-control in Ceylon Plantations (1926)
- Solid Space-algebra: The Systems of Hamilton and Grassmann Combined (1929)
- A Summary of Facts Regarding Malaria Suitable for Public Instruction (with Malcolm Watson) (1930)
- Memories of Sir Patrick Manson (1930)
- The solution of equations by iteration (with William Stott) (1930)
- A Priori Pathometry (with Hilda Phoebe Hudson) (1931)
- Mosquito Brigades and How to Organise Them ISBN 978-1-2905-5311-7

== Literary works ==
Ross was a prolific writer. He habitually wrote poems on most of the important events in his life. His poetic works gained him wide acclaim and they reflect his medical service, travelogue, philosophical and scientific thoughts. Many of his poems are collected in his Selected Poems (1928) and In Exile (1931). Some of his notable books are The Child of Ocean (1899 and 1932), The Revels of Orsera, The Spirit of Storm, Fables and Satires (1930), Lyra Modulatu (1931), and five mathematical works (1929–1931). He also compiled an extensive account The Prevention of Malaria in 1910 and another Studies on Malaria in 1928. He published his autobiography Memoirs, with a Full Account of the Great Malaria Problem and its Solution (547 pages long) in 1923. He carefully saved virtually everything about himself: correspondence, telegrams, newspaper cuttings, drafts of published and unpublished material, and all manner of ephemera.

== Awards and recognition ==
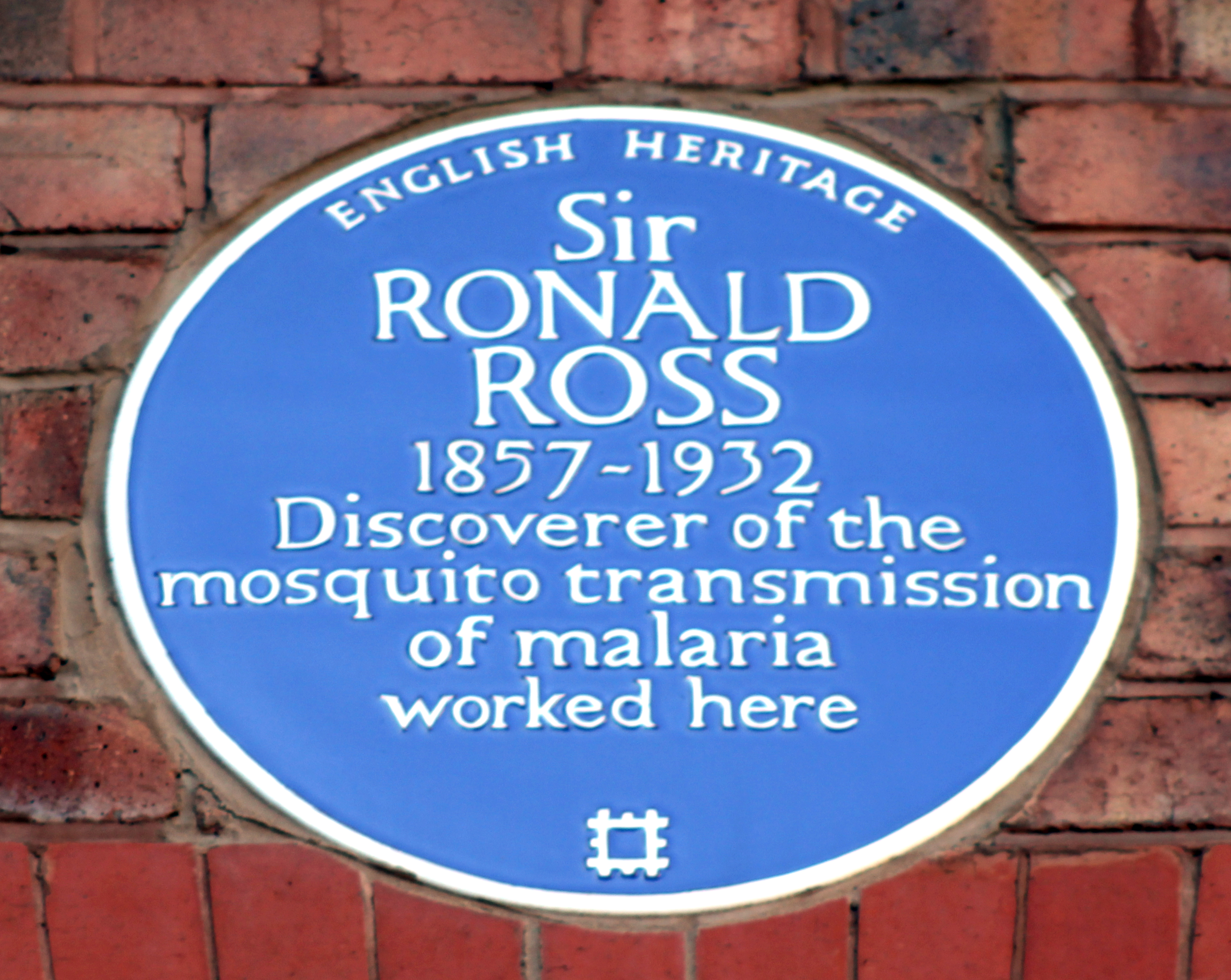
Plaque at Liverpool University – on the Johnston Building, formerly the Johnston Laboratories, near Ashton Street, Liverpool

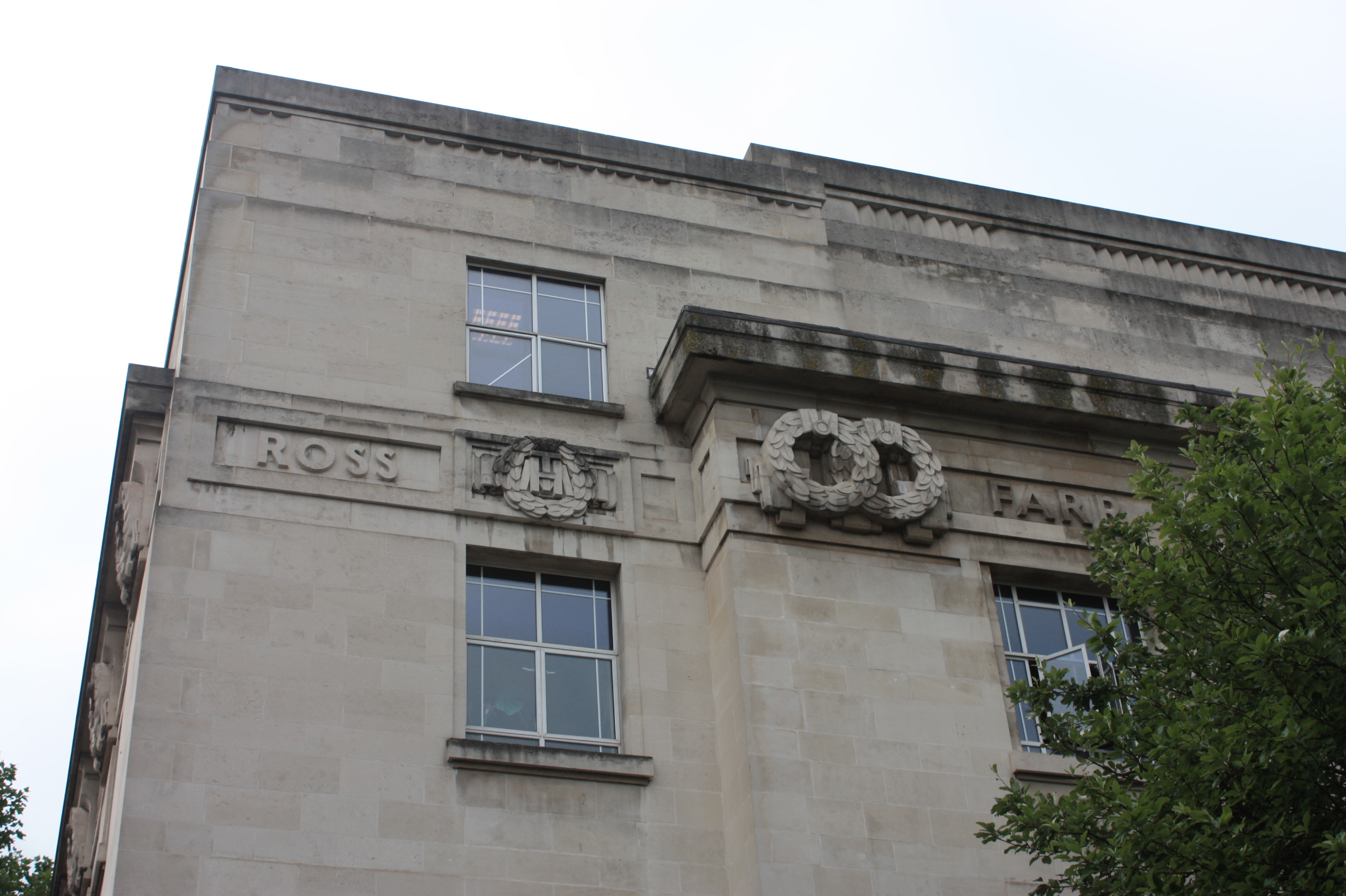
Ross's name remembered on the London School of Hygiene and Tropical Medicine

Ronald Ross was awarded the Nobel Prize for Physiology or Medicine in 1902 "for his work on malaria, by which he has shown how it enters the organism and thereby has laid the foundation for successful research on this disease and methods of combating it".

20 August is celebrated by London School of Hygiene & Tropical Medicine as World Mosquito Day to commemorate Ross's discovery in 1897. Additionally, Ross's name, along with 22 other pioneers of public health and tropical medicine, appears on the School's Frieze. The papers of Sir Ronald Ross are now preserved by the London School of Hygiene and Tropical Medicine and the Royal College of Physicians and Surgeons of Glasgow.

He was elected a Fellow of the Royal Society (FRS) in 1901 and of the Royal College of Surgeons in the same year. He was appointed vice-president of the Royal Society from 1911 to 1913. In 1902 he was appointed a Companion of the Most Honourable Order of the Bath by King Edward VII. In 1911 he was promoted to the rank of Knight Commander of the same Order. He was also decorated with the title Officer of the Order of Leopold II of Belgium.

Ross received honorary membership of learned societies of most countries in Europe, and elsewhere. He got an honorary M.D. degree in Stockholm in 1910 at the centenary celebration of the Caroline Institute and his 1923 autobiography Memoirs was awarded that year's James Tait Black Memorial Prize. While his vivacity and single-minded search for truth caused friction with some people, he enjoyed a vast circle of friends in Europe, Asia and the United States who respected him for his personality as well as for his genius.

In India, Ross is remembered with great respect as a result of his work on malaria, the deadly epidemic which used to claim thousands of lives every year. There are roads named after him in many Indian towns and cities. In Calcutta the road linking Presidency General Hospital with Kidderpore Road has been renamed after him as Sir Ronald Ross Sarani. Earlier this road was known as Hospital Road. In his memory, the regional infectious disease hospital at Hyderabad was named Sir Ronald Ross Institute of Tropical and Communicable Diseases. The building where he worked and actually discovered the malarial parasite, located in Secunderabad near the Begumpet Airport, is a declared a heritage site and the road leading up to the building is named Sir Ronald Ross Road.

In Ludhiana, Christian Medical College has named its hostel as "Ross Hostel". The young medics often refer to themselves as "Rossians".

The University of Surrey, UK, has named a road after him in its Manor Park Residences.

Ronald Ross Primary School near Wimbledon Common is named after him. The school's crest includes a mosquito in one quarter.

Sir Ronald Ross Institute of Parasitology was established in memory of Ronald Ross in Hyderabad, under Osmania University.

In 2010 the University of Liverpool named its new biological science building "The Ronald Ross Building" in his honour. His grandson David Ross inaugurated it. The building is home to the university's facility for the Institute of Infection and Global Health.

== See also ==
- Mosquito-malaria theory
- Albert Freeman Africanus King
- Paul de Kruif
- Plasmodium
- History of malaria
