= Edward Seager =

Edward Seager may refer to:

- Edward Seager (British Army officer)
- Edward Seager (asylum superintendent)
- Edward Leslie Seager, Church of England archdeacon
