= Hewitt Bernard =

Canadian lawyer, editor and civil servant

- Born: 1825; Spanish Town, Jamaica
- Died: February 24, 1893 (aged 67–68); Montreal, Quebec, Canada
- Known for: Role in Canadian Confederation
- Relatives: Agnes Macdonald, Baroness Macdonald (sister); Sir John A. Macdonald (brother-in-law)

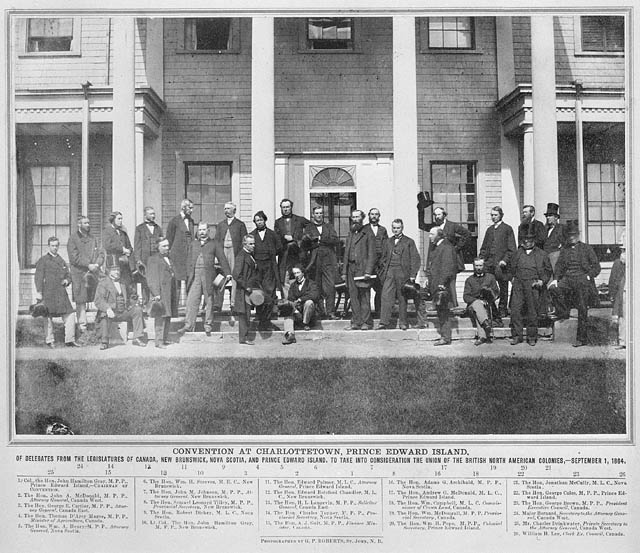
Charlottetown Conference of Delegates from the Legislatures of Canada, New Brunswick, Nova Scotia, and Prince Edward Island to take into consideration the Union of the British North American Colonies, September 1, 1864

Hewitt Bernard, CMG (1825 – 24 February 1893) was a Canadian lawyer, militia officer, editor, and civil servant.

== Life and career ==
Bernard was born in Spanish Town, Jamaica. He was educated in Bath, Somerset, England, and practiced law education in Jamaica until the death of his father in 1850. He came to British North America in 1851 to establish himself in law practice and settled in Barrie, Ontario, Canada, where he became part of local society. In 1854, he brought his mother and sister Agnes to live with him. About that time, he joined the local militia and eventually gained the rank of lieutenant-colonel. Bernard was a Freemason of Ionic Lodge, No. 25 (Ontario) of Toronto, resigning when he left to work in Quebec in 1859.

Bernard was a successful lawyer and co-editor of the Upper Canada Law Journal when he became the private secretary of Attorney General John A. Macdonald in 1857. He soon became chief clerk, and he was the recording secretary at the Charlottetown Conference in 1864.

In February 1867, Bernard's sister Agnes married John A. Macdonald, who became the prime minister of Canada a few months later. Bernard was a very good friend of Macdonald before he became Macdonald's brother-in-law.

After Confederation, Bernard served as the private secretary to the prime minister between 1867 and 1873. He was also the Deputy Minister of Justice from 1868 to 1876. Bernard was succeeded in that position by Zebulon Aiton Lash.

Some historians, such as P. B. Waite, consider Bernard to be a Father of Confederation. In 1872, he was made a Companion of the Order of St Michael and St George.
