= Sir Ronald Ross Institute of Parasitology =

Indian research institute

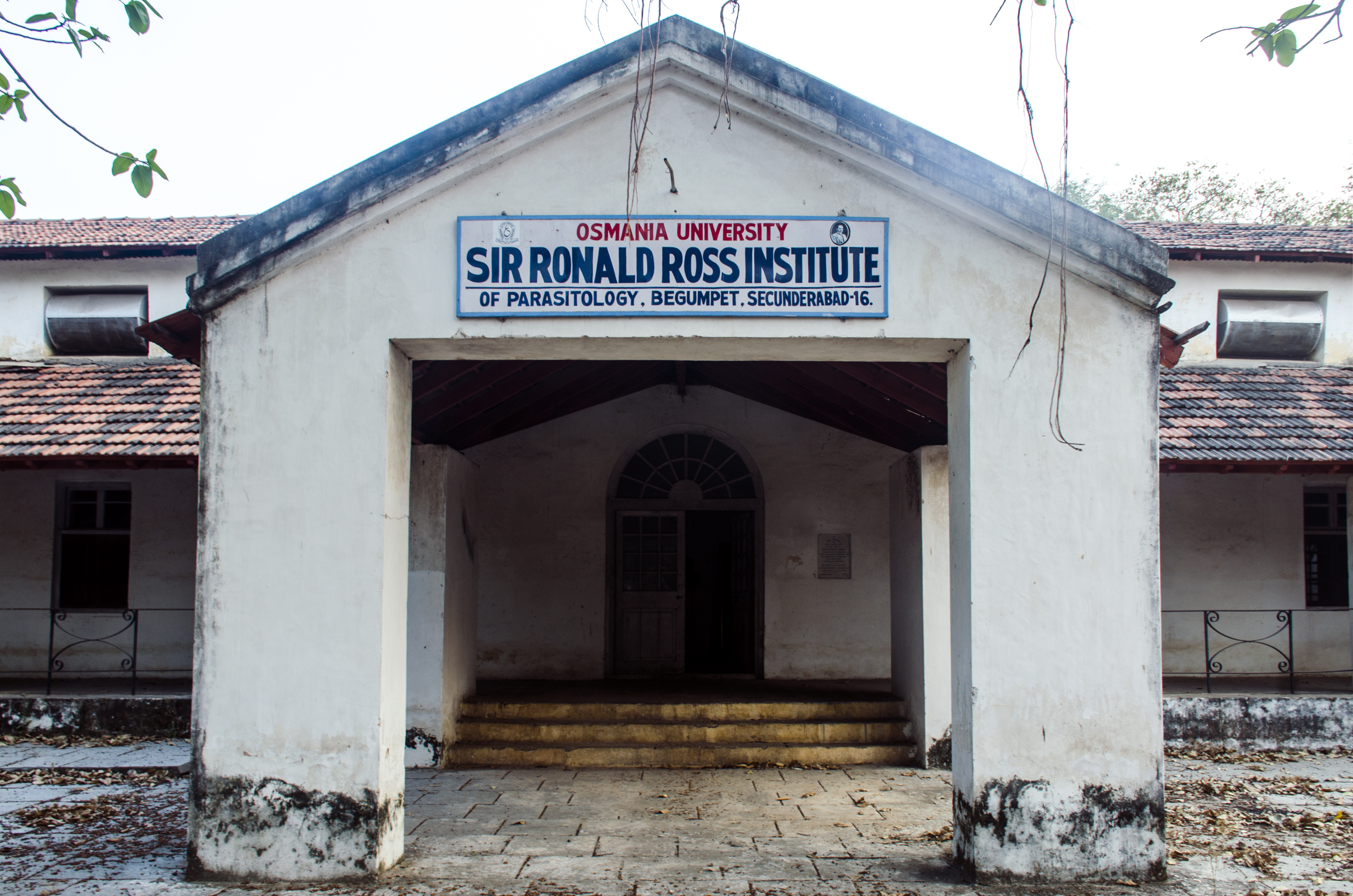
- Sir Ronald Ross Institute of Parasitology
- Abbreviation: SRRIP
- Formation: 1955
- Type: Public research institution
- Location: Begumpet, Secunderabad, Hyderabad, India
- Coordinates: 17°26′44″N 78°28′20″E
- Director: Masood Hussain
- Parent organization: Osmania University
- Website: SRRIP

Sir Ronald Ross Institute of Parasitology is a malaria research institute located in Begumpet, Secunderabad, Hyderabad, India. Established in 1955, the institute is a division of Osmania University. The institute is named after Sir Ronald Ross, winner of Nobel Prize for Physiology or Medicine, 1902.

== History ==
Sir Ronald Ross was posted as a general duty medical officer to the regiment stationed in Secunderabad in 1893. Though he was a surgeon by qualification, Ross was attracted towards research in tropical diseases, especially malaria. During his posting, he worked on his research from a laboratory in the old Begumpet military hospital building. Built in 1895, this building was surrounded by marshes which proved rather helpful for his research experiments. It was in this building on 20 August 1897 that he made the discovery of the malarial parasite inside the body of a mosquito. Later 20 August was celebrated as the World Mosquito Day. His study confirmed that mosquitoes were the carriers of malaria parasite. For his work in demonstrating the life-cycle of the parasites of malaria in mosquitoes, and thus establishing the hypothesis of Laveran and Manson, Ross was awarded the Nobel Prize in 1902.

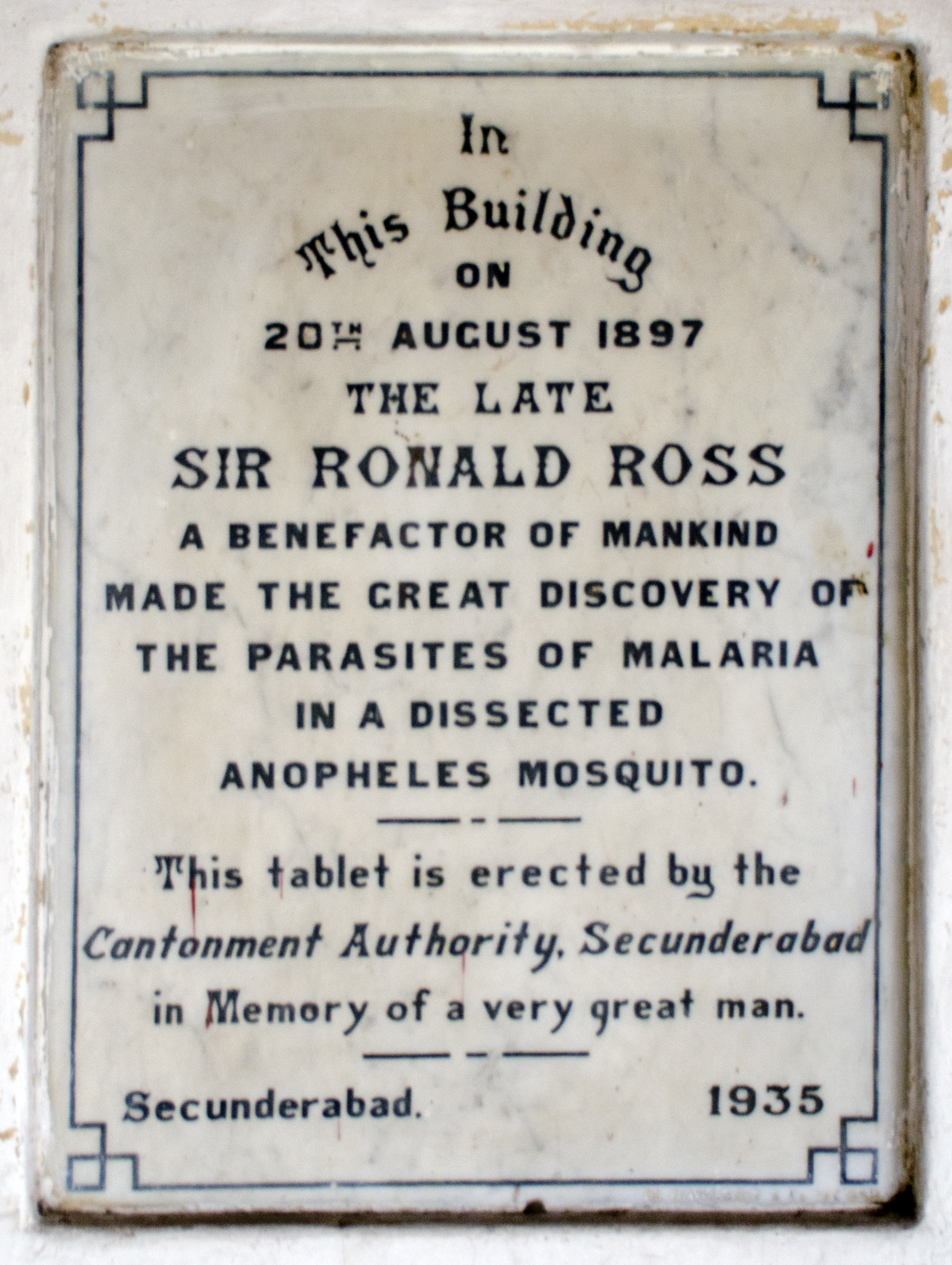
Plaque of the discovery of transmission of Malaria

In 1955, Satyanarayan Singh, a Professor of Zoology at Hyderabad's Osmania University acquired the building from the then Deccan Airways and established the Malaria Research Institute in this building. Research scholars from Osmania University and Osmania Medical College worked here until the building was taken over by the Airports Authority of India. A pilot training centre was set up in this building. Former Prime Minister of India, Rajiv Gandhi, was trained in this building. In 1979, Osmania University took over the building and continued research here.

== Restoration of the building's heritage ==
In 1935, the Secunderabad Cantonment Board, the local civic agency, installed a marble tablet in appreciation of Ross' achievement. In 1997, about 700 scientists from 30 countries gathered at this building to commemorate the centennial of Ronald Ross' discovery. On this occasion, the building was renovated at the cost of ₹4.1 million (US$43,000) by the British High Commission. Being a heritage building, the Archaeological Survey of India granted ₹ 650,000 for its further development. In addition, a plan was announced to convert the facility into a centre of excellence and develop the landscape around the building. Despite spending money on renovation, the building was not properly maintained.

In 2008, the state government formed a committee for the restoration, conservation and promotion of the building as tourist destination. A grant of ₹ 4 million was to be utilised for developing a horticulture park and relocation of airport offices. Upon the completion of restoration, the local tourism department was set to promote the building and its heritage as a destination for national and international tourists. Despite several attempts to revive the facility, the building lies secluded and devoid of academic or research activity and without steady source of financial support. Lack of political will and lack of bureaucracy was blamed for its current state.

Bodies like the Royal Society of Tropical Medicine and Hygiene and researchers from University of York have expressed interest in attaching themselves with the institute.

== See also ==
- Ronald Ross
- Sir Ronald Ross Institute of Tropical and Communicable Diseases
- Genome Valley
