= Jowaki Expedition =

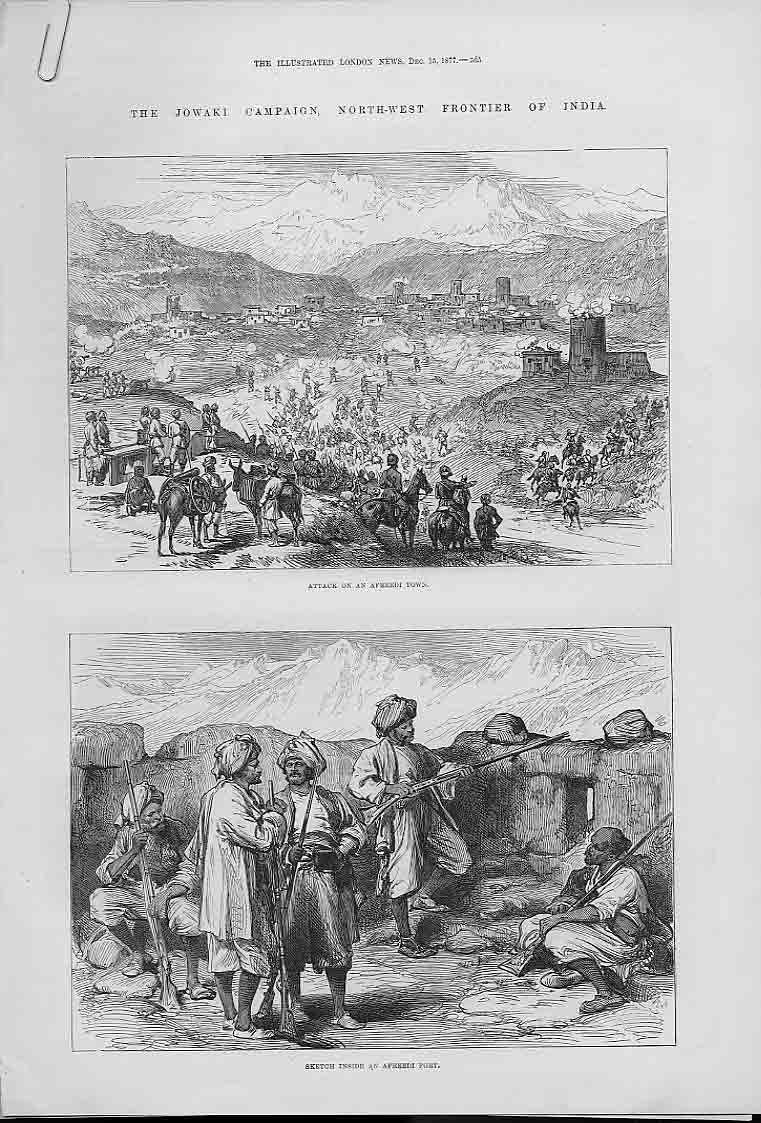
- Illustration for The Illustrated London News
Date	30 August 1877 – 30 January 1878
Location	Kohat Pass
Result	British victory

Belligerents
British Empire	Jowaki Afridi tribesmen

Commanders and leaders
Brig. Gen. Charles Patton Keyes; Brig. Gen. Campbell Claye Grant Ross	Babari(Mohammad Shah)

Units involved
Punjab Irregular Force	None

Strength
7,400	Unknown

Casualties and losses
11 killed 51 wounded	Unknown

The Jowaki Expedition was a British punitive expedition in India, occurring between 1877 and 1878. It started when the British government in India proposed to reduce the payment of the Jowaki Afridi tribe in the Northwest Frontier. The Jowaki were paid to guard in the Kohat Pass and in retaliation for a reduction in payment they raided British territory. The expedition ended in January 1878 when tensions died down.

== Background ==
In the 1870s, the British colonial government in India gave the Jowaki Afridi tribe a tribute payment to guard the Kohat Pass. At the time the Jowaki were the most powerful Pathan tribe in the northwest frontier. In 1875, local tribes in the area of the Kohat Pass, including the Jowaki, objected to the building of a road through the pass. The final straw for the Jowaki came in 1877 when they had their payment reduced by the colonial government.

In response the Jowaki cut the telegraph wire, entered the village of Shakkote (located on the Cherat road beneath the hill fort of Cherat), killed almost all of the Sepoy guard of 18 men, and made off with British rifles. The same day the colonial government issued a war proclamation against the Jowaki, stating that if they did not give up the Shakkote murderers, return the stolen British rifles, and pay an indemnity of 30,000 rupees as a guarantee of their future good behaviour, the British would advance into their territory. The Jowaki said they were not going to agree to any terms and were ready to fight.

== Course ==
In 1877, the first British sortie against the Jowaki consisted of 1,500 troops of the British Punjab Frontier Force in three columns under the command of Frederic David Mocatta, 3rd Sikh Infantry. Shortly afterwards they were joined by a larger force of 5,900 troops in two columns under the command of brigadier generals, Charles Patton Keyes and Campbell Claye Grant Ross.

On 9 November, the 3rd Sikh Infantry advanced on the Paiya Valley where they met little resistance from the Jowaki. After some skirmishes in the area, they moved on to the Shindai Valley, pushing back a Jowaki force stationed there. By 1 December they had pushed the Jowaki out of their stronghold in Jummu and chased them through the Naru Khula gorge.

In January 1878 the 3rd Sikh Infantry returned to Jummu. At the end of that same month, 50 men of the Jowaki tribe met with British commanders in the Paiah Valley for peace talks. However, they refused the British conditions and continued guerrilla assaults. Guerrilla assaults included the burning of the disputed road in Kohat pass. Even though peace was never made, that was the end of the Jowaki Expedition.
