= World Mosquito Day =

Annual observance (20 August)

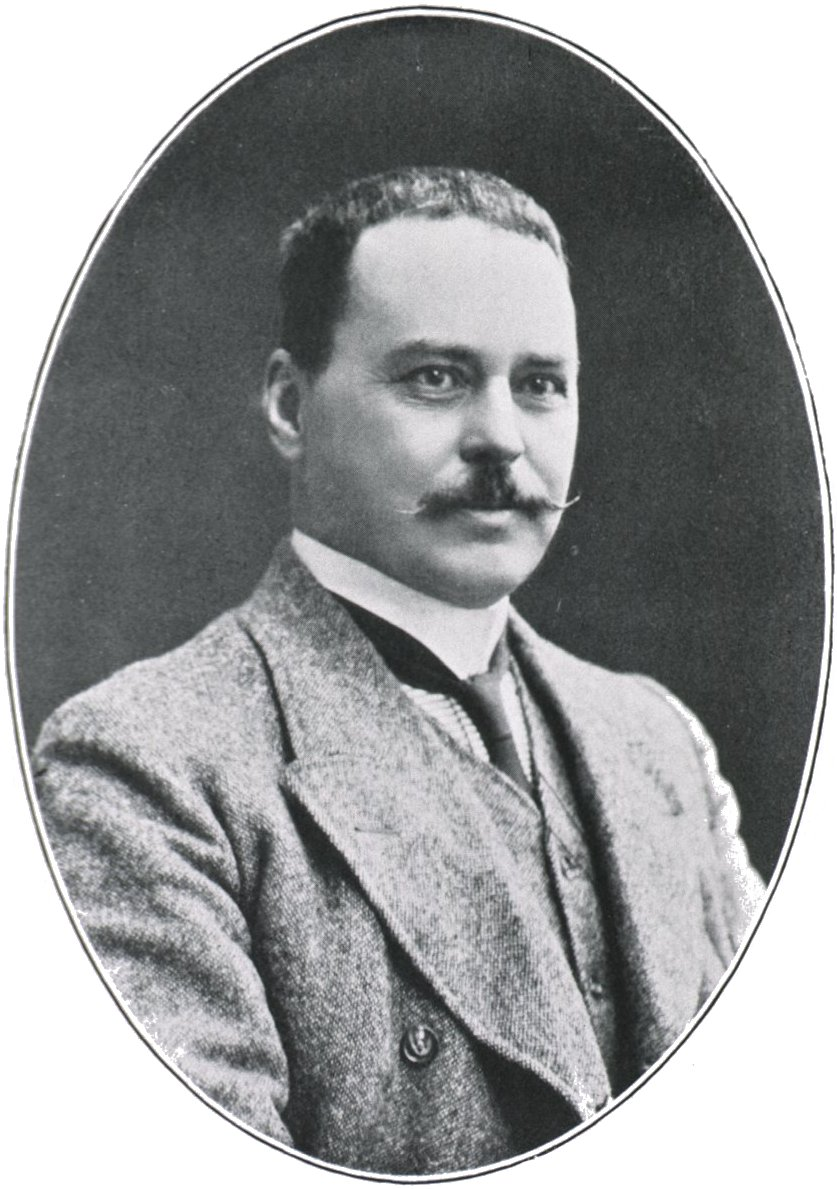
Ronald Ross.

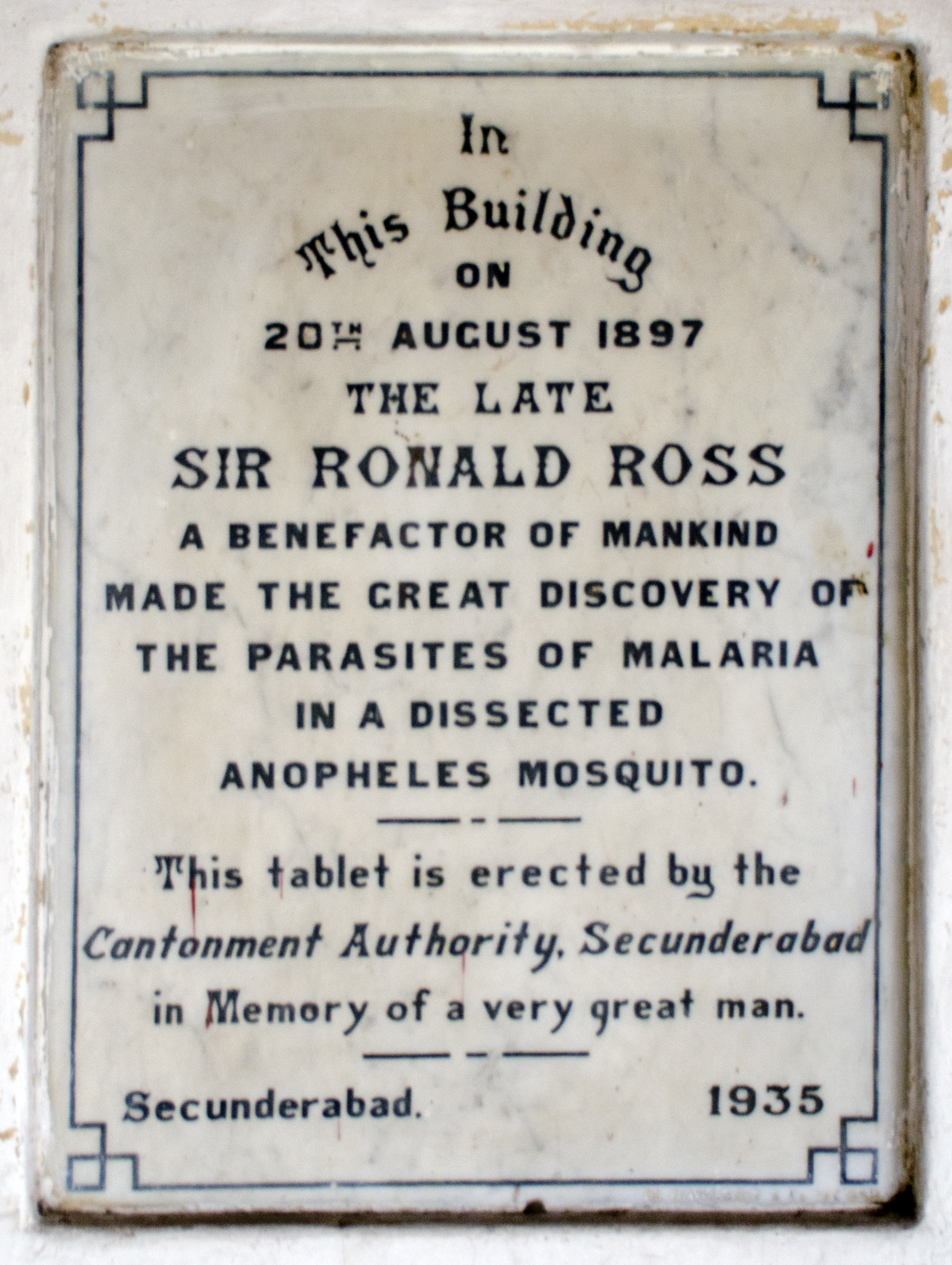
Plaque of the discovery of transmission of Malaria.

World Mosquito Day, observed annually on 20 August, is a commemoration of British doctor Sir Ronald Ross's discovery in 1897 that female anopheline mosquitoes transmit malaria between humans, thus confirming the mosquito-malaria theory, an idea that had been building in recent years through the work of various contributors such as Charles Louis Alphonse Laveran and Patrick Manson. Prior to the discovery of the transmitting organism, vector, there were few means for controlling the spread of the disease although the discovery of quinine in treatment had alleviated the problem of treatment. According to one survey, nearly half the world population was at significant risk from malaria in the 19th century with a 10% mortality among those infected. Ross had already conducted experiments with Culex (possibly C. fatigans) fed on birds infected with bird malaria Protesoma relictum (now Plasmodium relictum) in 1894 and noted that they developed in mosquito gut and had surmised that the same may happen in malaria. The discovery was made in a small laboratory in Begumpet area of Secunderabad, Hyderabad. Today the laboratory is known as the Sir Ronald Ross Institute of Parasitology and houses a small museum on Ross and his malaria research. Ross had noted the day of the discovery made in Secunderabad:

The 20 August 1895 (Note: Though printed incorrectly as 1895, the year was 1897 based on his postings.)—the anniversary of which I always call Mosquito Day—was, I think, a cloudy, dull hot day. I went to hospital at 7 a.m., examined my patients, and attended to official correspondence; but was much annoyed because my men had failed to bring any more larvae of the dappled-winged mosquitoes, and still more because one of my three remaining Anopheles had died during the night and had swelled up with decay. After a hurried breakfast at the Mess, I returned to dissect the cadaver (Mosquito 36), but found nothing new in it. I then examined a small Stegomyia, which happened to have been fed on Husein Khan on the same day (the 16th)—Mosquito 87—which was also negative, of course. At about I p.m. I determined to sacrifice the seventh Anopheles (A. stephensi) of the batch fed on the 16th, Mosquito 38, although my eyesight was already fatigued. Only one more of the batch remained.

The London School of Hygiene & Tropical Medicine holds Mosquito Day celebrations every year, including events such as parties and exhibitions. The event was inspired by a tea party honouring Ross held on 20 August 1931 by the Ross Institute and Hospital for Tropical Diseases, which merged with the School in 1934.

== See also ==
- World Malaria Day – International observance, 25 April
