= List of fellows of the Royal Society elected in 1901 =

This is a list of fellows of the Royal Society elected in 1901.

== Fellows ==
- James Mansergh (1834–1905), civil engineer
- Franz von Leydig (1821–1908), German zoologist and comparative anatomist
- William Watson (1868–1919), British physicist
- Sir William Schlich (1840–1925), German-born forester
- Sir Henry Bradwardine Jackson (1855–1929), Royal Navy officer, ship-to-ship wireless technology pioneer
- Michael Rogers Oldfield Thomas (1858–1929), zoologist
- Sir Ronald Ross (1857–1932), Nobel Prize–winning doctor for his work on malaria
- John Walter Gregory (1864–1932), geologist and explorer
- Alfred William Alcock (1859–1933), physician, naturalist and carcinologist
- Hector Munro Macdonald (1865–1935), Scottish mathematician
- Arthur Smithells (1860–1939), British chemist
- Sir Frank Watson Dyson (1868–1939), astronomer and Astronomer Royal
- Sir Arthur John Evans (1851–1941), archaeologist
- Sir Arthur Smith Woodward (1864–1944), palaeontologist
- Sir William Cecil Dampier (1867–1952), scientist, agriculturist, and science historian
- Sir Charles James Martin (1866–1955), biologist
