= Thomas Lawrence Seccombe =

Sir Thomas Lawrence Seccombe, GCIE, KCSI, CB (29 July 1812 – 13 April 1902) was a British civil servant who worked for the East India Company and the India Office, in which he served as Financial Secretary and Assistant Under-Secretary of State for India.
