= Sir Ronald Ross Institute of Tropical and Communicable Diseases =

Sir Ronald Ross Institute of Tropical and Communicable Diseases, also known as Fever Hospital, is a hospital in Nallakunta, India, which treats diseases such as diphtheria, diarrhea, measles, mumps, cholera, and hepatitis. The hospital is affiliated with Osmania Medical College.

== See also ==
- Sir Ronald Ross Institute of Parasitology
