= Ocklynge =

Coordinates: 50°46′40″N 00°16′05″E

Ocklynge is an area in Eastbourne, England.

== Etymology ==
The etymology is from the Anglo-Saxon language: lynge is thought to be from link or ridge, and the ock component is believed to come from Occa, a putative leader of a small band of Saxons.

== Location ==
The Grade II-listed Ocklynge Manor is located in Ocklynge. This land was held by the Knights Hospitaller, and their return of 1338 the following particulars are given:

"There is at Okelyng one messuage which is worth yearly 12d. And there are 52 acres of land, value per acre 12d., and they are worth 52s. Also there are 3 acres of meadow, value per acre 18d., and they are worth 4s. 6d. Also pasture there is common for 200 sheep, which is worth yearly 16s 8d. And please and perquisities of courts worth 6. 8d."

Ocklynge has a large primary school, Ocklynge Primary (Junior School).

== Ocklynge Cemetery ==
Opened in 1857, it is the resting place of Agnes Macdonald, 1st Baroness Macdonald of Earnscliffe and her daughter Mary, second wife and daughter of Canadian Prime Minister Sir John Alexander Macdonald. The cemetery is home to 174 Commonwealth War graves from World War I and II.
