= Robert Calder Allen =

Captain Robert Calder Allen CB
- Born: 8 August 1812; Stoke Damerel, Devonshire
- Died: 28 January 1903; London, England

Robert Calder Allen CB (8 August 1812 – 28 January 1903) was an English naval captain.

Allen was the son of William Allen, a master in the navy and presumably a follower of Admiral Sir Robert Calder. He entered the navy as a second-class volunteer in July 1827. In that grade and as second master he served with credit, principally on the west coast of Africa and in China. In 1841 he was advanced to be master, and in 1842-44 was master of the Dido, with Sir Henry Keppel, in her celebrated cruises against the Malay pirates of Borneo.

In 1850-51, he was master of the Resolute in the Arctic, under Captain Austin, whom he followed from the Blenheim, and was in charge of the magnetic observations. In 1854-55 he was master of the Hogue blockship in the Baltic, and rendered efficient service by his survey, often under fire, of the approaches to Bomarsund. In 1863 he was promoted to the then new rank of staff-commander, and in 1867 to that of staff-captain. In 1866-67 he was master-attendant and harbour-master at Malta; and in 1867 was appointed in the same capacity to Devonport, from where he was transferred to Deptford. When that dockyard was closed in October 1870, he retired with the rank of captain. He was a silent, thoughtful man, singularly modest and retiring. The subordinate position in which so much of his service was passed prevented his name from coming prominently before the public; but in the navy his reputation as a sound and skilful navigator and pilot stood very high, and was officially recognised in his nomination to C.B. in 1877.

He died in London in 1903.

== Personal life ==
Allen married twice. His first wife brought him a daughter and four sons, who all entered the public service, navy, army, or marines. The second wife survived him.
