= Edward Seager (British Army officer) =

British Army officer

Lieutenant-General Edward Seager CB
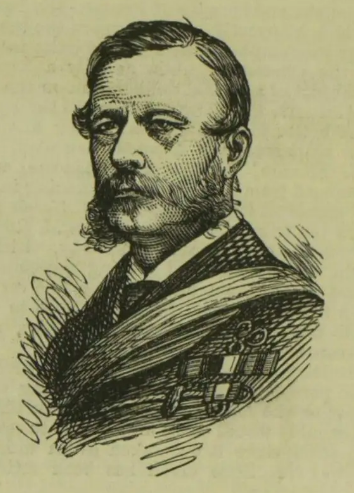
- Portrait of Seager as a colonel, 1875
- Born: 11 June 1812
- Died: 30 March 1883 (aged 70) Sion House, Scarborough, North Riding of Yorkshire, England

Lieutenant-General Edward Seager CB (11 June 1812 – 30 March 1883) was a British Army officer who served in the Crimean War and in the Indian Mutiny.

Seager, was born on 11 June 1812, and, after serving in the ranks for nine years and one hundred and eighty-eight days from 1832 and reaching the rank of sergeant-major, was commissioned as a cornet of the 8th Light Dragoons on 17 September 1841. He was adjutant from 5 October 1841 to 25 October 1854, being gazetted lieutenant on 29 June 1843, captain on 26 October 1851, and major 31 January 1858.

Seager was married to Jane Emily Smith and had three children, George William, Jane Emily Sophia and Florence Wallena. His daughter Emily married Charles Edwin Paynter, president of the Liverpool Timber Trade Association, who was lost in the 1915 sinking of the RMS Lusitania.

He served with his regiment in the Crimean War of 1854, and up to February 1855, and was present at the battles of Alma, Balaclava (where he was wounded), Inkerman, and the siege of Sebastopol. On 28 June 1855 he was appointed assistant military secretary to Major-general Lord William Paulet, commanding on the Bosphorus, and continued in the same office under Sir Henry Knight Storks until the end of the war on 31 July 1856, when he was rewarded with a medal and four clasps, the fifth class of Medjidie, and the Turkish medal.

Later on he served in Central India, 1858–9, was present at the action of Boordah, was mentioned in the despatches, and received a medal. From 5 August 1859 to 5 August 1864 he was lieutenant-colonel of his regiment, and was then gazetted a brevet colonel in the army.

From 3 November 1864 to 31 January 1870 he was acting quartermaster-general in the Dublin district, and from 1 April 1873 to 3 April 1878 inspecting officer of yeomanry cavalry at York. On 15 January 1870 he became a major-general, and on 1 July 1881 was placed on the retired list with the rank of lieutenant-general. On 10 May 1872 he received one of the rewards for 'distinguished and meritorious services,’ and on 2 June 1877 was gazetted C.B.

He died at Sion House, Scarborough, on 30 March 1883. His grave can be found in Toxteth Park Cemetery in Liverpool.
